= Companions of Liberation =

Membership name of the Order of Liberation award

A Companion of Liberation (French: Compagnon de la Libération) is a member of the Order of the Liberation, created on November 16, 1940, by General de Gaulle as "leader of the Free French" to "reward the people or military and civilian communities who have distinguished themselves in the work of liberation of France and its empire".

== Description ==
Five communes (Paris, Île de Sein, Nantes, Grenoble and Vassieux-en-Vercors), 18 combat units including two warships, and 1,038 people count among the Companions of the Liberation during the signing of the decree of foreclosure of the order of the Liberation. Of the 1,038 companions, 271 were appointed posthumously. The youngest, who died at 14, is Mathurin Henrio.

Seventy-three foreigners or French-born foreigners, of 25 different nationalities, were made companions. Among the most famous are Dwight D. Eisenhower, King Mohammed V of Morocco, King George VI and Winston Churchill, decorated after Order foreclosure.

On October 12, 2021, Florence Parly, announced to Senate the death of Hubert Germain, the last surviving companion since the death of Daniel Cordier in November 2020. As such, he is buried in the crypt of the Combatant France Memorial at Mont Valérien on November 11, 2021.

== Attribution ==
The 'companions' represent fairly well the history of Free France, the French Resistance and the French Liberation Army, we note however that the different categories are not represented in proportions in conformity with their actual participation. The circumstances, the difficulties of the time in knowing the real action of the resistance, the criteria of General de Gaulle and his rapid departure from power in 1946, probably explain this fact.

Of the 1,038 companions, there are only six women, which is far below their proportion in the ranks of the Resistance. (Note: While they represent 20 to 30% of the resistance fighters, the council of the order received only nine proposals from women, who were still civil and civic minors in 1940.) The Resistance is likewise under-represented compared to Free France, which represents three-quarters of the decorated. General de Gaulle indeed began by decorating combatants and agents that he or those close to him knew; its contacts with the other components of the French Resistance were not really established until around 1942, a period which saw the unification of the latter under the aegis of London by Jean Moulin. Moreover, in the opacity of the clandestine struggle, the leaders of the movements had more difficulty in identifying the most deserving patriots to propose them for decorations. In principle, each movement of the internal resistance had two crosses. But a certain number of leaders or senior figures of the resistance movements never received it, for example Raymond and Lucie Aubrac or the founders of the “Defence of France” movement. Even unwavering supporters of General de Gaulle such as Philippe Peschaud or his own son Philippe de Gaulle( Charles never appointed his son a Companion of the Liberation, stating tout le monde sait que tu fus mon premier compagnon ("everyone knows that you were my first companion"), probably to avoid being open to possible accusations of nepotism. Yet, in the opinion of some Gaullists and companions, Philippe would have been deserving of the honour, given his immediate engagement in Free France and his service in the army for five years, often at the forefront. Nor did Philippe's father award his son the Medal of the Resistance.), or later like Michel Debré, were not made companions, sometimes to the chagrin of the general.

It can also be noticed that the Companions were chosen from among those who, at one time or another, took the risk of opposing the Vichy regime as the Free French had done. Thus, for example, Marshal de Lattre was made a companion while Marshal Juin was not.

Ten percent of the Companions of the Liberation were under 20 years of age at the start of the war, in 1939.
