= Raymond Anne =

French resistance fighter

- Born: 17 December 1922; Villers-Bocage, Calvados, France
- Died: 21 July 1944 (aged 21); Vassieux-en-Vercors, Drôme, France
- Occupation: Resistance fighter
- Known for: Emtombed in the Mémorial de la France combattante

Raymond Anne (17 December 1922 – 21 July 1944) was a member of the French Resistance during World War II (1939–45). For ceremonial purposes he was chosen to represent all the members of the French Resistance who died in action against the Germans.

== Life ==
Raymond Anne was born on 17 December 1922 in Villers-Bocage, Calvados. During World War II (1939–45) he became "Sergeant Filochard" in the Forces françaises de l'intérieur (FFI) in the French Resistance. Vassieux-en-Vercors, on the Vercors Massif of the Alps, was a center of the resistance of the Maquis du Vercors. Hundreds of "Montagnards" converged there after news was received of the Normandy landings of 6 June 1944. The Germans bombed and destroyed the village from 14–21 July 1944, then sent in troops. About 840 French people died and 150 German troops. Raymond Anne was killed by the enemy at Vassieux on 21 July 1944.

== Honors ==
Vercors soon became a symbol of national importance, and on 4 August 1945 the Croix de la Libération was given to the commune of Vassieux. Raymond Anne is entombed at the Mémorial de la France combattante at Mont-Valérien, where he represents the FFI. He is buried in the 3rd crypt on the left. At the Nécropole de la Résistance in Vassieux-en-Vercors there is a room of memories which has a plaque recording that Raymond Anne rests in the crypt at Mont-Valérien as representative of all the maquis of France. He was posthumously awarded the Croix de Guerre 1939–45 with star and the Médaille de la résistance.

== Sources ==
- Coustaury, Alain (2006). "Nécropole de Vassieux-en-Vercors".
- "La crypte du mémorial de la France combattante". Mont Valérien.
- Quellien, Jean (1996-01-01). La France de 1945 : Résistances, Retours, Renaissances. Presses universitaires de Caen. ISBN 978-2-84133-062-1.
- "Vassieux-en-Vercors". Ordre de la Libération. Archived from the original on 2011-02-24.
- Vergnon, Gilles (2002). Le Vercors: histoire et mémoire d'un maquis. Editions de l'Atelier. ISBN 978-2-7082-4371-2.
