= Pierre Simonet =

French resistance fighter and official (1921–2020)

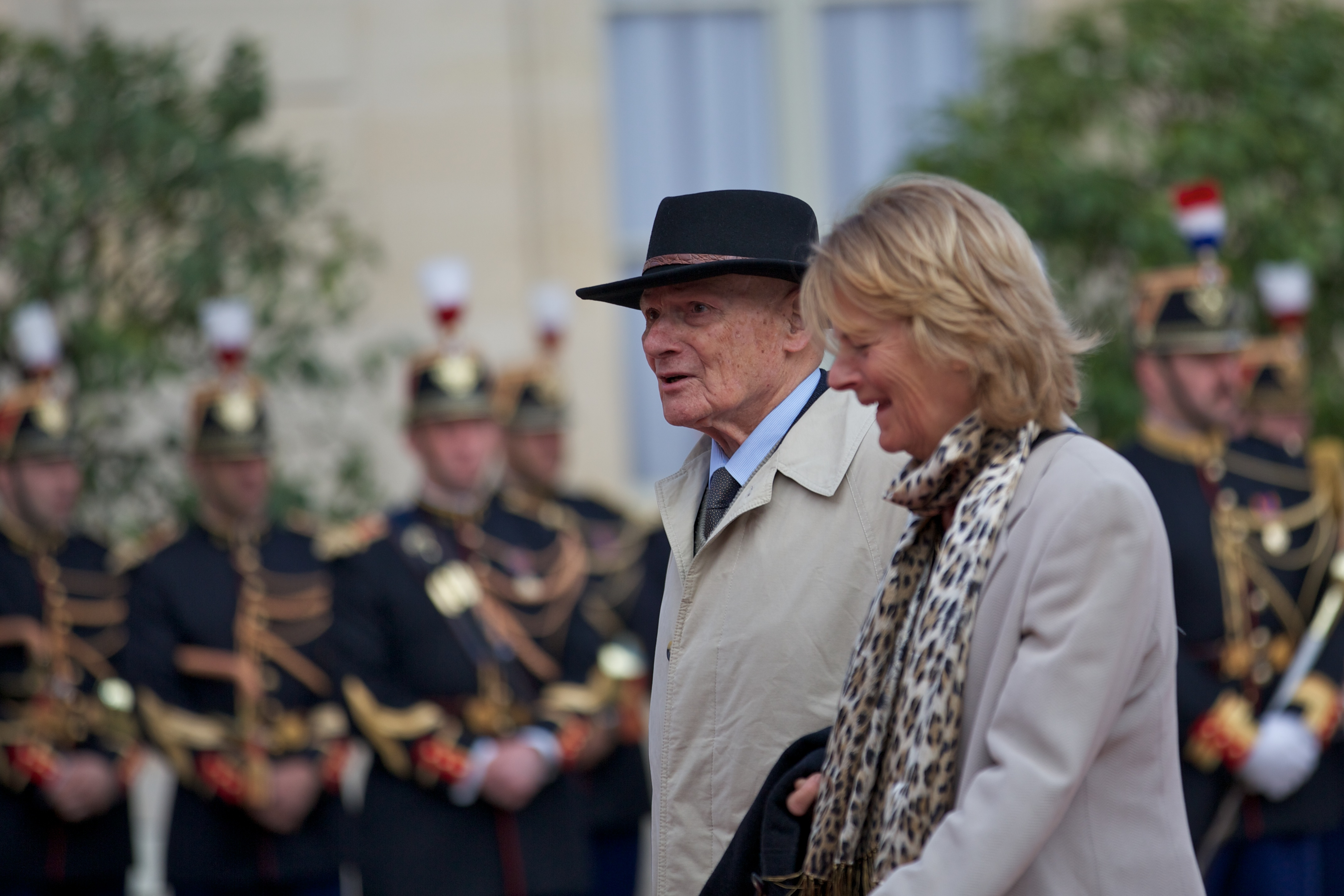
- Simonet in 2012
- Born: 27 October 1921; Hanoi, French Indochina
- Died: 5 November 2020 (aged 99); Toulon, France
- Spouse: Lucienne Ragain
- Military career
- Allegiance: France
- Branch: Free French Forces
- Service years: 1940–1945
- Rank: Captain
- Conflicts: World War II
- Awards: Grand Cross of the Legion of Honour; Order of Liberation; Croix de Guerre 1939–1945; Resistance Medal; Colonial Medal; Order of the British Empire

Pierre Adrien Simonet (27 October 1921 – 5 November 2020) was a French militant and senior official. He was with the Free French Forces before becoming a colonial administrator and international official.

== Biography ==
Pierre was the son of Gilbert Simonet, an alumnus of the École Polytechnique and an engineer of bridges and roads in French Indochina. Gilbert fought for France in World War I before returning to Indochina, where Pierre was born. After his secondary studies at the Lycée Thiers in Marseille and the Lycée Albert Sarraut in Hanoi, Pierre returned to France in 1939 for his university education. France and the United Kingdom had just declared war on Germany, although Simonet was too young to be deployed. He instead studied preparatory mathematics at the Lycée Montaigne in Bordeaux.

On 17 June 1940, Philippe Pétain announced France's surrender to Germany over the radio. Simonet was shocked by this declaration and decided to revolt. After the Appeal of 18 June by Charles de Gaulle, he decided to fight alongside the General. On 24 June, he departed on the final cargo ship, the Baron Kinaird, which left Saint-Jean-de-Luz for Liverpool. He enlisted in de Gaulle's Free French Forces on 1 July 1940 where he set out to be an aviator, but was denied due to his lack of a pilot's license. He was instead assigned to a camp in Surrey. He was supervised by commissioned and non-commissioned officers of the Free French Forces.

Simonet left the United Kingdom on 29 August 1940 for an expeditionary force in Dakar which sought to rally French West Africa in favor of Free France. He fought in the Battle of Dakar, which attempted to free the key port from Vichy France. He was then stationed in Cameroon in French Equatorial Africa, where he continued his training until January 1941. He took part in the Syria–Lebanon campaign in June and July 1941, the result of which was decided in Damascus as a victory for Free France. Simonet served in the 1st Free French Brigade under General Marie-Pierre Kœnig and participated in the North African campaign from January to July 1942. Fighting in a Jock column on 16 March, he faced a strong attack by enemy tanks. However, he did not abandon his position and saved a large amount of French military equipment. He also fought in the Battle of Bir Hakeim from 26 May to 21 June, serving as a telephone operator until 10 June before taking up arms and aiding a boost in Free French morale with a victory.

Simonet's brigade was engaged in the Second Battle of El Alamein in October 1942, aiding the Eighth Army in the Tunisian campaign against the Afrika Korps, led by Erwin Rommel. He then became an officer candidate at the end of 1943. At the end of the Italian campaign, he was assigned to an aerial observation platoon as an observation officer flying a Piper J–3 Cub. He often ventured deep into enemy territory in order to gain vital information. His unit was engaged in the offensive of 8 May 1944, which broke the Winter Line and the Hitler Line. He helped liberate Rome, Siena, and Tuscany.

During Operation Dragoon on 16 August 1944, he continued to act as an observer from an airplane. Between 20 and 25 August, he fulfilled many war missions between Hyères and Toulon. During the Battle of Alsace, he took part in the destruction of several tanks and spotted two batteries. Appointed second lieutenant, he participated in the Battle of Authion and the liberation of Cuneo. On 18 June 1945, following the Liberation of Paris and Victory in Europe Day, he piloted one of the three Piper Cubs which passed under the Eiffel Tower. He married Lucienne Ragain in 1945 in Saigon.

After the war, Simonet began studying at the École nationale de la France d'Outre-Mer. In 1948, he joined the cabinet of Nguyễn Văn Xuân, head of the Provisional Central Government of Vietnam. He began taking courses at the Institut national de la statistique et des études économiques and the University of Paris. He then worked in Cameroon from 1951 to 1952 as an administrator in various areas, such as Mora, Meiganga, Ngaoundéré, and Yaoundé. He aided in Decolonization and helped the transfer of power to Cameroonian authorities. He became an international civil servant in 1958 as a statistician and economist in Southeast Asia for the Food and Agriculture Organization. He was a part of the mission for the development of countries along the Mekong.

From 1959 to 1960, he was an advisor of economic statistics in Iran for the United Nations. Back in France, he earned a degree from the Centre d'études des programmes économiques. In 1962, he joined the OECD as an economist in Paris. He joined the International Monetary Fund in 1964. From 1973 to 1977, he served as an IMF representative in Haiti and El Salvador. He also served in the Comoros and Lesotho from 1981 to 1984.

Simonet retired in 1985 and settled in Toulon with his wife, who had followed him in all of his missions. In 1999, he became a member of the Council of the Order of Liberation. He was awarded the Grand Cross of the Legion of Honour in December 2019, presented by General Benoît Puga. During the commemorations of the 80th anniversary of the Appeal of 18 June, British Prime Minister Boris Johnson announced that the last four Companions of the Liberation, Edgard Tupët-Thomé, Hubert Germain, Daniel Cordier, and Pierre Simonet, would become Honorary Members of the Order of the British Empire. The decoration was presented to Simonet by Ed Llewellyn, Ambassador of the United Kingdom to France.

Pierre Simonet died in Toulon on 5 November 2020 at the age of 99. President Emmanuel Macron stated in a press release that "he was indeed a hero: no matter how much he refused this title, he had all the attributes - courage, moral strength, a sense of duty". Minister of the Armed Forces Florence Parly and her Secretary of State, Geneviève Darrieussecq, issued a joint statement, saying "the whole country will remember his courage, his tenacity and his modesty".

== Decorations ==
- Grand Cross of the Legion of Honour (2019), Grand Officer (2014), Commander (1996)
- Order of Liberation (1945)
- Croix de Guerre 1939–1945
- Resistance Medal
- Colonial Medal
- Honorary Member of the Order of the British Empire (2020)
