= Joseph Rivière =

Joseph Rivière may refer to:

- Joseph Rivière (sculptor)
- Joseph Rivière (politician)
