= Edgard Tupët-Thomé =

French militant (1920–2020)

- Born: 19 April 1920; Bourg-la-Reine, France
- Died: 9 September 2020 (aged 100); Paris, France
- Occupation: Militant

Edgard Tupët-Thomé (19 April 1920 – 9 September 2020) was a French militant. He served in the Free French Forces.

== Biography ==
After he obtained his bachelor's degree, Tupët-Thomé entered the École supérieure de théologie catholique de Reims. However, he soon decided to join the French Armed Forces and was incorporated into the 8th Zouaves Regiment and stationed in Camp de Châlons. Promoted to sergeant, his regiment was attacked in Lorraine in September 1939 and in Belgium the following year. He participated with his unit in the Dunkirk evacuation from 26 May to 3 June 1940. He was taken prisoner the next day but escaped back to France during his transfer.

While back in France, Tupët-Thomé found work in Clermont-Ferrand, where he met Roger Wybot and Stanislas Mangin, who tasked him with finding illegal airstrips. He was then one of the first men to join the Free French Forces, led by Charles de Gaulle. He parachuted into Châteauroux on 9 December 1941. However, he was injured during his landing, and was forced to leave combat. Six months later, he left France to seek treatment in England. While in London, he requested to join a combat unit. He left to work as a commando instructor in Saint Pierre and Miquelon. In August 1943, Tupët-Thomé joined the 4th Air Infantry Battalion, which would become the 2nd Parachute Chasseur Regiment, part of the Brigade SAS. He became a certified parachutist the following month. In January 1944, he became second in command of the 3rd Parachute Chasseur Regiment. The Regiment's first mission was in Daoulas in August 1944. His group of 12 men outlasted Germany's 60. He then attacked Germany's stronghold in Landerneau, liberating the city. Subsequently, he freed Clerval. His final parachute mission was in the Netherlands on 7 April 1945.

In 1945, Tupët-Thomé resigned from the French Armed Forces. He was admitted to the École nationale de la France d'Outre-Mer and became an administrator of colonies in French Tunisia in January 1946. He would later become director of Takelsa's wine production. He left Tunisia in 1950 for Canada and managed a farm which he had acquired. In 1955, he returned to France, resumed his studies, and became an engineer at the Organisation scientifique du travail and joined the Singer Corporation in a pharmaceutical laboratory in Neuilly-sur-Seine.

He became a mercenary in the Katangese Gendarmerie, the army of the secessionist State of Katanga led by Moïse Tshombe, as an adviser to Joseph Yav, defence minister as part of Katangese disengagement with Belgium.

Subsequently, he worked for Panhard and finished his career working for a tourism agency.

After his retirement, Tupët-Thomé lived in Binic, where he took part in commemoration ceremonies. He was then admitted to Les Invalides in Paris, where he would become a resident. He was honored with the Grand Cross of the Legion of Honour and was named a Companion of the Liberation. During the commemoration of the 80th anniversary of the Appeal of 18 June, British Prime Minister Boris Johnson announced that the last four members of the Order of the Liberation, Daniel Cordier, Pierre Simonet, Hubert Germain, and Edgard Tupët-Thomé would be honorary members of the Order of the British Empire. The honor was presented by Ed Llewellyn, Ambassador of the United Kingdom to France on 2 July 2020.

Edgard Tupët-Thomé died at Les Invalides on 9 September 2020 at the age of 100. The French President Emmanuel Macron issued a press release, saying: "This resistance from the first hour, who was until his last breath a committed man, ready to oppose the bad winds of history with the breath of the ideal". The Minister of Armed Forces, Florence Parly, and the Minister of Memory and Veterans Affairs, Geneviève Darrieussecq, paid tribute, declaring: "Every key moment of the Second World War in France is found in the epic of the young Edgard Tupët" and "Like his 1038 brothers in arms, he personified the honor of France and the participation of our country in the Victory". It was announced that military honors would be returned to him on 17 September 2020 in a ceremony at the courtyard of Les Invalides.

== Distinctions ==
- Grand Cross of the Legion of Honour (2019, Grand Officer in 2016)
- Companion of the Liberation
- Croix de Guerre 1939–1945
- Military Cross
- King's Medal for Courage in the Cause of Freedom
- Order of Orange-Nassau
- Netherlands War Cross
- Honorary Member of the Order of the British Empire (2020)

== Book ==
- Spécial Air Service : 1940-1945, l’épopée d’un parachutiste en zone occupée (1980)
