= Daniel Cordier =

French Resistant fighter and historian (1920–2020)

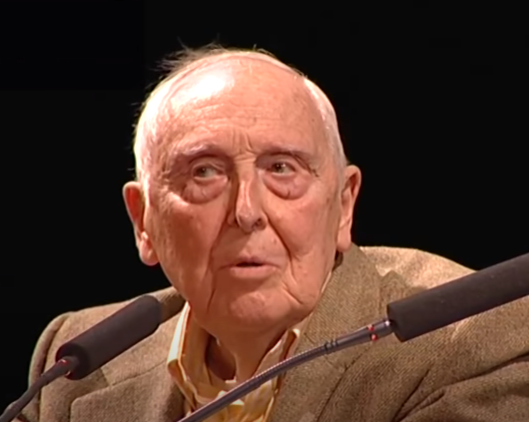
- Cordier in 2012
- Born: Daniel Bouyjou; 10 August 1920; Bordeaux, France
- Died: 20 November 2020 (aged 100); Cannes, France
- Occupations: Resistance fighter Art dealer Historian

Daniel Cordier (10 August 1920 – 20 November 2020) was a French Resistance fighter, historian and art dealer. As a member of the Camelots du Roi, he engaged with Free France in June 1940. He was secretary to Jean Moulin from 1942 to 1943, and his opinions evolved to the left. He was named a Companion of the Liberation in 1944, and, after the war, he became a historian and art dealer. He was an advocate for gay rights.

== Biography ==
Daniel Bouyjou was born on 10 August 1920 in Bordeaux. His father, René Bouyjou, worked in the family coffee business, which flourished across Europe. In 1919, René married Jeanne Gauthier, although the couple divorced in 1925. Jeanne remarried in 1927 to Charles Cordier. When Daniel joined the French Resistance in London, he listed his official last name as "Bouyjou-Cordier". With René dying in 1943, he would officially take the name "Cordier" in 1945.

Throughout his youth, Daniel's father retained custody. He attended various Catholic schools, such as the École Saint-Elme d'Arcachon. Influenced by royalism and Maurrassisme by his stepfather, Cordier joined Action Française at the age of 17 and founded the Cercle Charles-Maurras in Bordeaux. Cordier admired Charles Maurras and was anti-Semitic, anti-socialist, anti-communist, anti-democratic, and ultranationalist during this period. Even during his time with Free France, he hoped for judgment against the socialist politician Léon Blum. However, patriotism for France outlasted his early ideals and he joined the Free French Forces.

In June 1940, while with his family in Bescat, Cordier listened on the radio as Philippe Pétain announced the French surrender to Germany and the armistice. Outraged, he distributed a pamphlet against Pétain. He, along with 16 others, embarked on a Belgian ship headed to Algeria. However, the ship landed in England. He reached Falmouth on 25 June and joined his fellow Frenchmen three days later. He was assigned to the Bataillon de chasseurs de Camberley to undergo training. Following his training, he was given the rank of Lieutenant.

Entering the Bureau Central de Renseignements et d'Action, Cordier parachuted into Montluçon on 26 July 1942. He quickly reached Lyon and began under the service of Jean Moulin of the French National Committee. He took the pseudonym Alain and began work as Moulin's secretary. He managed mail and radio links to London and created various organs of the Resistance. In Lyon, he managed to recruit Laure Diebold, Hugues Limonti, Suzanne Olivier, Joseph Van Dievort, Georges Archimbaud, Laurent Girard, Louis Rapp, and Hélène Vernay. In Paris, he brought Jean-Louis Théobald, Claire Chevrillon, and Jacqueline Pery d'Alincourt to the Resistance. In Lyon, he would eventually be replaced by Tony de Graaff.

Cordier's work led to the foundation of the National Council of the Resistance on 27 May 1943. To create this council, many compromises had to be made between Moulin and Pierre Brossolette, a colleague of Charles de Gaulle. After Moulin's death, Brossolette called for Cordier's return to London. However, he stayed with Moulin's successor, Claude Bouchinet-Serreulles until 21 March 1944. He crossed the Pyrenees and entered Pamplona, where he was briefly interned at the Miranda concentration camp. He then joined British forces. Historian Jacques Baynac suggested in his book Présumé Jean Moulin that Cordier had been arrested by Nazi Germany around 14 June 1943, a claim denied by Cordier.

As he would later tell in his autobiography, Alias Caracella, Cordier abandoned his royalist beliefs, partly because he felt betrayed by his idol, Charles Maurras, who supported Vichy France. He also grew uncomfortable with his anti-Semitic beliefs.

After the end of World War II, Cordier stopped discussing the Resistance for more than thirty years. He dedicated himself to political activism, having given up his far-right beliefs after becoming acquainted with the radical socialist Jean Moulin. He followed humanist and non-Marxist socialist beliefs. He founded the Club Jean-Moulin in the 1960s. During the 2017 French presidential election, he was outspoken against Marine Le Pen, describing her potential election as "monstrous".

Cordier had a profound career as an art dealer. He spoke highly of Jean Moulin in the preface to his donation to the Centre Pompidou. In 1946, he began studying at the Académie de la Grande Chaumière. At that time, he bought his first work, a painting by Jean Dewasne. His discovery of the works of Nicolas de Staël was "his revelation of modern art". Other artists he collected included Georges Braque, Chaïm Soutine, Hans Hartung, Jacques Villon, Dado, Arman, Antoni Tàpies, Georges Mathieu, Friedensreich Hundertwasser, Gaston Chaissac, and others. In November 1956, he began exhibiting his artworks, which would show the start of a long and successful career in art dealing. In May 1957, he organized the first personal exhibition of Bernard Réquichot, whom he had met in 1950.

Cordier became very active in the cause for gay rights, he wrote in his autobiography Alias Caracalla : mémoires, 1940-1943. In it, he revealed his homosexuality, which he had kept a secret due to the fact that "the hatred towards homosexuality was terrible". In 2013, he announced his support for gay marriage. His diary, Les Feux de Saint-Elme, was published in 2014 while the second volume of his autobiography was in production, though that would never be published. He wrote of his sexual awakening while attending an all-boys boarding school in Arcachon. He was a friend of Roland Barthes, as well as a tutor for Hervé Vilard and inspired him to pursue a singing career.

In 2020, during the commemoration of the Appeal of 18 June, Prime Minister of the United Kingdom Boris Johnson honoured the last four Companions of the Liberation: Cordier, together with Edgard Tupët-Thomé, Pierre Simonet, and Hubert Germain. The four men were named to the Order of the British Empire by Ambassador of the United Kingdom to France Ed Llewellyn. He received the award at his home in Cannes on 7 July 2020.

== Death ==
Cordier died in Cannes on 20 November 2020 at the age of 100. His death left Hubert Germain as the last surviving Companion of the Liberation. President of France Emmanuel Macron stated in a press release:

"for the freedom and honor of France, he entered the Resistance, left everything, accepted the danger, the loneliness, the arid routine and the insane complications of the clandestine networks ... Assigned to the administration of the Resistance networks in the South zone, he was parachuted in 1942 and then became the secretary ... of Jean Moulin. Their commitment ... allowed that on the day of the landing the allies saw a France rising from the shadow in which it was lurking, ready to take back its destiny in hand".

Minister of the Armed Forces Florence Parly and her Secretary of State, Geneviève Darrieussecq issued a joint statement, saying "a romantic life which is dying out, spent in the service of Liberty, for the greatness of France".

== Decorations ==
- Companion of the Liberation (1944)
- Croix de Guerre 1939–1945
- Prix littéraire de la Résistance for Alias Caracalla : mémoires, 1940-1943 (2009)
- Prix Renaudot de l'essai for Alias Caracalla : mémoires, 1940-1943 (2009)
- Prix Nice-Baie-des-Anges for Alias Caracalla : mémoires, 1940-1943 (2009)
- Grand Cross of the Legion of Honour (2017)
- Honorary Member of the Order of the British Empire (2020)

== Works ==
- Jean Moulin et le Conseil national de la Résistance (1983)
- Jean Moulin. L’Inconnu du Panthéon (1989)
- Jean Moulin. La République des catacombes (1999)
- Pierre Brosolette ou Le Destin d'un héros (2001)
- Alias Caracalla : mémoires, 1940-1943 (2009)
- De l’Histoire à l’histoire (2013)
- Les Feux de Saint-Elme (2014)
