= Lycée Victor Hugo, Paris =

Lycée Victor-Hugo
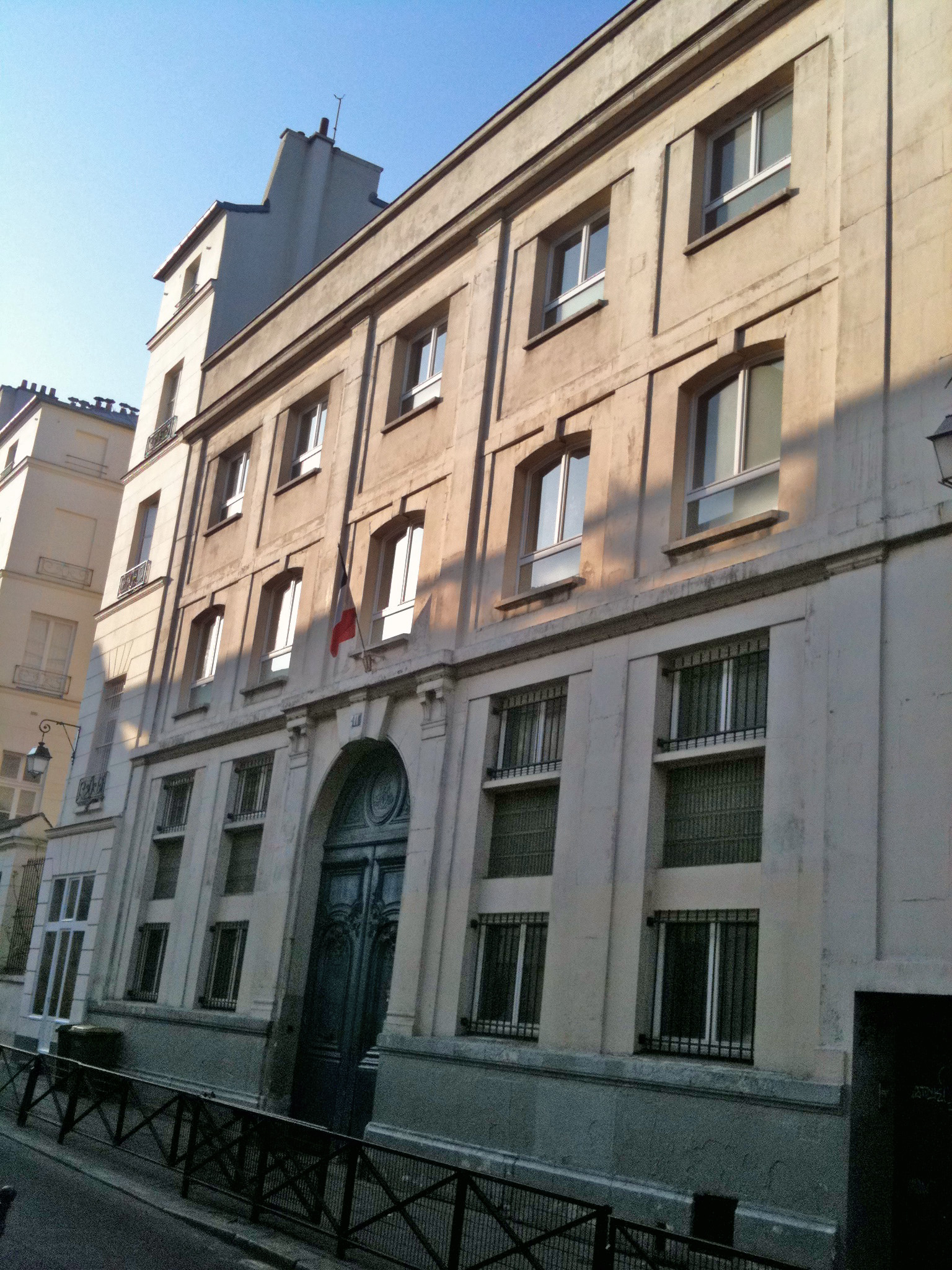
- Front view of Barbette's Pavillon of the Lycée Victor-Hugo

Location
- 27 rue de Sevigne; Paris; France
- Coordinates: 48.857792°N 2.363097°E

Information
- Enrolment: 1,200

The Lycée Victor-Hugo is a secondary school in the 3rd arrondissement, Paris, France.

== History ==
The school is built on the site of the Convent of the Heavenly Annunciation, called the Blue Girls, founded in 1622. The convent was destroyed in 1796 and replaced by two apartment houses. The state acquired the property in 1892 and razed the buildings. New buildings were designed by the architect Anatole de Baudot (1834-1915), completed in 1894. Through a presidential decree of 17 July 1895, the school was named after the French writer Victor Hugo (1802-1885).

At first there were one hundred pupils. Due to growth in the number of pupils, the school purchased a group of buildings in 1938 on the rue Vieille-du-Temple, where it opened the petit lycée Victor-Hugo. In 1857 another property was purchased on 11 rue Barbette. In 1960 the original building by Anatole de Baudot, the first reinforced concrete building, was destroyed to make way for a canteen covered by a terrace. In 1970 the school became co-educational. The school now accommodates 480 students, from college to preparatory classes for the grandes écoles.

== Notable alumni ==
- Renée Lévy (1906-1943), member of the French Resistance. She studied classical literature at the Lycée and she also became a teacher in the Lycée in 1937.
- Solange Troisier (19 July 1919 – 9 September 2008), French physician, former Inspector General of Prisons
- Silvia Monfort (6 June 1923 – 30 March 1991), French actress and theatre director
- Marco Enríquez-Ominami (born 12 June 1973), Chilean politician.
- Àstrid Bergès-Frisbey (born 26 May 1986), French-Spanish actress.
