= Mémorial de la France combattante =

Monument in Suresnes, Hauts-de-Seine, France

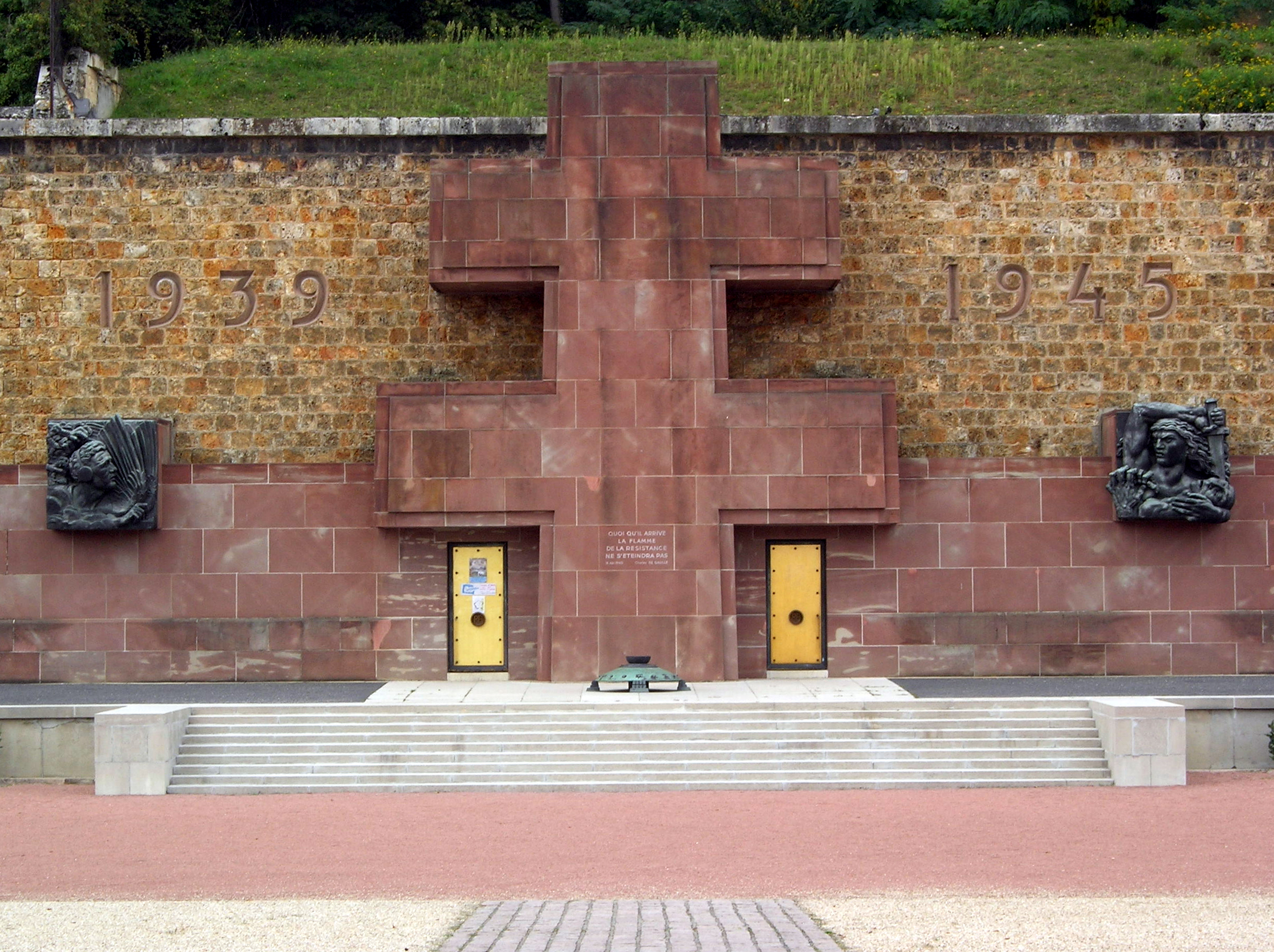
- Cross of Lorraine at the entrance to the crypt (September 2006)
- Interactive map of Mémorial de la France combattante
- Location: Fort Mont-Valérien, Suresnes
- Coordinates: 48°52′18″N 2°12′50″E
- Designer: Félix Brunau
- Type: War memorial
- Material: Stone
- Length: 100 metres (330 ft)
- Height: 12 metres (39 ft)
- Beginning date: 11 November 1945
- Completion date: 18 June 1960
- Dedicated to: French World War II fighters

The Mémorial de la France combattante (Memorial to Fighting France) is the most important memorial to French fighters of World War II (1939–1945). It is situated below Fort Mont-Valérien in Suresnes, in the western suburbs of Paris. It commemorates members of the armed forces from France and the colonies, and members of the French Resistance. Fifteen representative French fighters were buried here in an elaborate ceremony on 11 November 1945. The present memorial was opened on 18 June 1960. It has a wall in which are set sixteen bronze reliefs that represent in allegorical terms the different phases, places and participants in the struggle.

At first the memorial made no reference to the victims who had been executed at the Fort Mont-Valérien, which had been frequently used by German forces to execute resistance fighters and hostages. Later a remembrance path was opened linking the crypt to the nearby clearing where the shootings occurred. The memorial is often the site of ceremonies related to World War II.

== Background ==
Mont-Valérien was the site of a medieval hermitage and a popular place of pilgrimage from the 17th to 19th centuries. Fort Mont-Valérien was built in the mid-19th century, one of the forts guarding the perimeter of Paris. It is located in Suresnes on top of Mont Valérien. During World War II the Germans used Fort Mont-Valérien as a place where they executed members of the resistance and hostages. The condemned were brought by truck, locked in a disused chapel, then taken to a clearing about 100 metres (330 ft) below where they were shot. The bodies of the fusillés (Note: The fusillés were those shot by firing squads at Fort Mont Valérien, more than 1,000 in all.) were then dispersed in the cemeteries of Paris. More than a thousand victims have been identified.

On 1 November 1944 General Charles de Gaulle paid tribute to the members of the Resistance who had died. He first visited the clearing at Mont-Valérien, then visited Fort Neuf de Vincennes, another location where prisoners were shot in Paris, and finally visited the cemetery of Ivry-sur-Seine, the main place where the victims of shooting in the Ile-de-France were buried. In 1945 de Gaulle decided to make a memorial to World War II at Mont-Valérien. The monument was not to be a tribute to the victims of war, but to honor those who had refused to yield, the war heroes. It was to present the members of the resistance as members of the armed forces, as representatives of the eternal France, and not as factional revolutionaries from marginal groups.

De Gaulle held a ceremony at Fort Mont-Valérien on 18 June 1945 with 200 Companions of the Liberation, honoring those killed during the war. On 11 November 1945 the bodies of 15 fighters were buried at the site in an old casemate that had been converted into a temporary crypt. They include nine combatants, three members of the Resistance and three deportees. In the ceremony General de Gaulle was preceded by torchbearers when he came into the fort. Accompanied by Admiral Georges Thierry d'Argenlieu he entered the casemate where the victims had awaited execution, then lit the eternal flame outside, the symbol of the Resistance. The inauguration ceremony and the original monument made no reference to the fusillés who had been executed at Mont-Valérien during the war.

== Construction ==
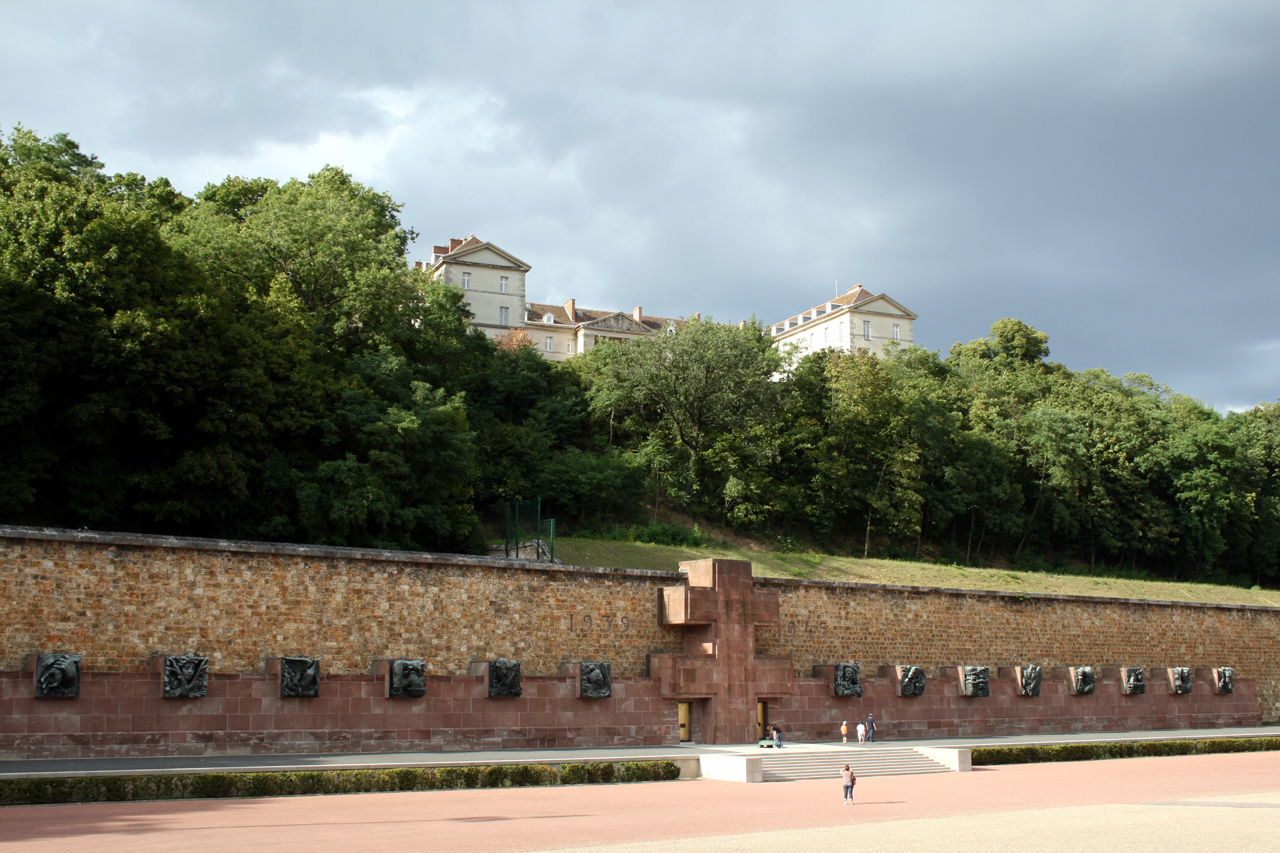
Panorama of the fort

When he again became President of the French Republic after the May 1958 crisis in Algeria, General de Gaulle decided to create a memorial to Fighting France. Félix Brunau, inspector general of public buildings and palaces, was charged with the task by presidential decree of 24 November 1958. The intent was to represent different aspects of the fight, including the phases of the war, the locations where fighting occurred and the branches of the armed forces and the resistance that were involved.

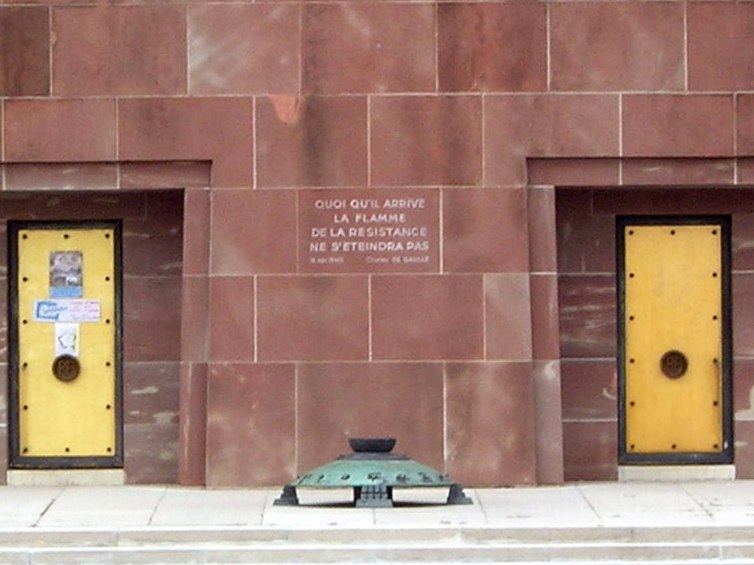
Entrance to the crypt

The monument was erected against the southeast wall of the fort, near the clearing of the Fusillés, facing an esplanade covering over 10,000 square metres (110,000 sq ft). The esplanade has been named the Place Abbé Franz Stock. Franz Stock cared for the condemned prisoners while they were held in the fort, and recorded many of the executions in his diary.

On 2 November 1959 a ceremony was held in which a sandstone slab was laid in the center of the clearing dedicated to those who had been shot. During the night of 17 June 1960 the coffins of sixteen fighters were transferred from the old casemate to the crypt in the new monument, each coffin accompanied by six torch bearers. An empty tomb was reserved for the last Companion of the Liberation. The next day President de Gaulle formally inaugurated the memorial.

The monument consists of a wall of pink sandstone from the Vosges 150 metres (490 ft) long, on which are mounted sixteen bronze hauts-reliefs depicting, in allegorical form, different types of heroic combat. A Cross of Lorraine 12 metres (39 ft) high stands in the center, in front of which the permanent flame of the resistance burns on a bronze structure. The cross is essentially a Gaullist symbol. There are two bronze doors under the cross. One leads to the burial crypt, carved into the rock. The other gives access to the stairway that leads to the remembrance path. At the base of the Cross of Lorraine an inscription gives part of de Gaulle's speech of 18 June 1940: "Quoiqu'il arrive la flamme de la résistance ne s'éteindre pas" ("Whatever happens, the flame of the resistance will not be extinguished.")

Raymond Triboulet, Minister of Veterans Affairs inaugurated the remembrance path in 1962. It retraces the path of the fusillés from the chapel, where the execution poles are kept, to the clearing. The pathway to the clearing, which has important symbolism to the communists, attempted to reconcile the very different political views of Gaullists and Communists. On 3 March 1998 a commission was established to pay tribute to the fusillés at Mont Valérien. On 20 September 2003 Prime Minister Jean-Pierre Raffarin inaugurated a monument to the memory of the fusillés, bearing the names of those members of the resistance and hostages who have been identified. The monument is the work of the sculptor Pascal Convert, and has the form of a bronze bell. There is a museum that presents the history of the memorial in the room next to the crypt. The memorial and the esplanade continue to be used for many ceremonies.

== Crypt ==
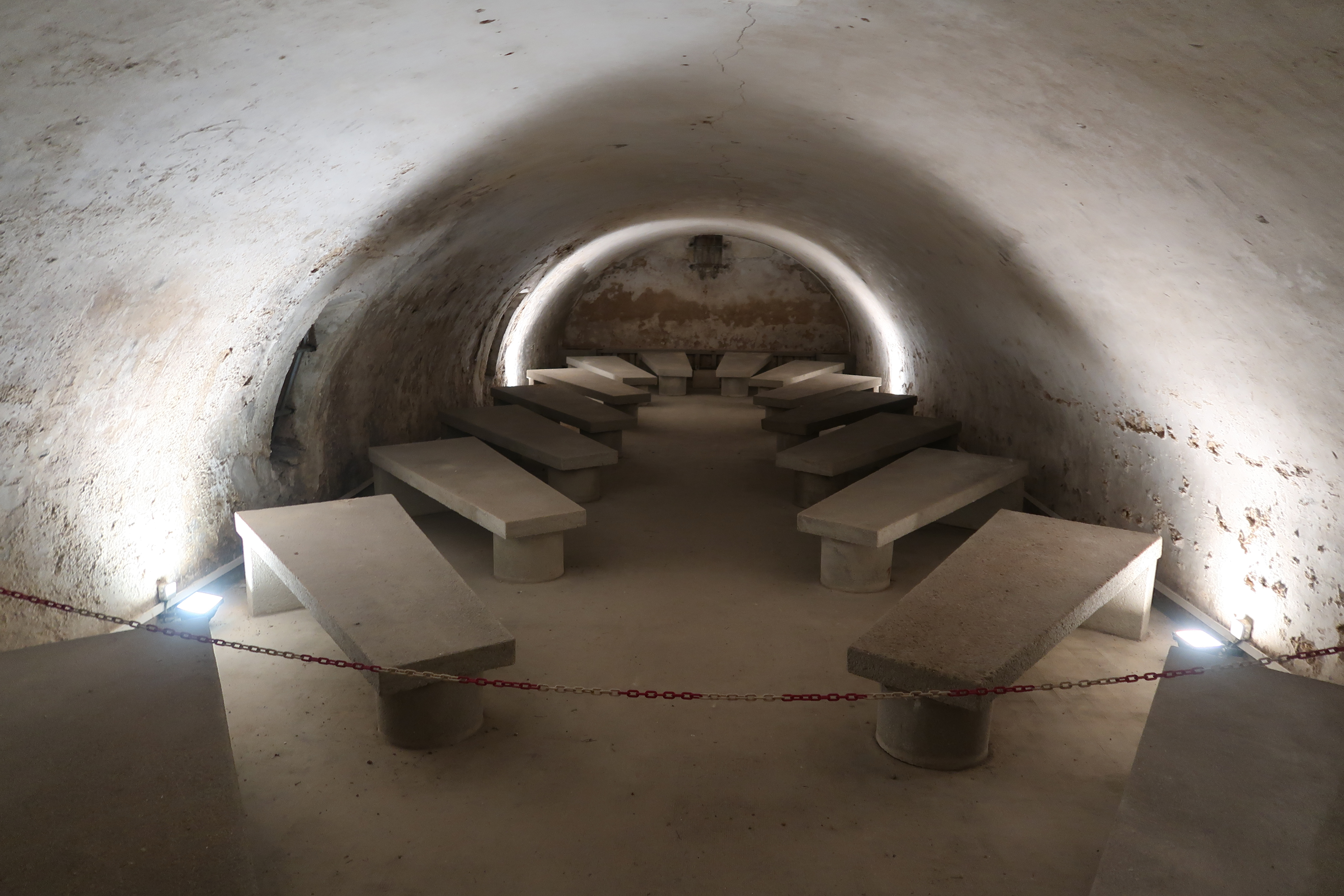
The temporary crypt, a former casemate, used until 1960.

The cenotaphs in the crypt are arranged in an arc and covered with the tricolor, surrounding the urn containing the ashes of unknown deportees.

On the tympanum of the nave there is the sentence: "We are here to testify before history that from 1939 to 1945 her sons fought for France to live free."

The urn is embellished with a metal sculpture representing a flame.

Henri Frenay was charged in 1945 with organizing the ceremony and selecting those to be buried to represent a broad spectrum of those engaged in the struggle. The fifteen included casualties in Italy and Egypt, members of the marine and the airforce, colonial troops from Morocco, Tunisia and Senegal, and the deported resistance fighters Renée Levy and Raymond Bigosse. Levy may have been chosen as a gesture to the sufferings of the Jewish people in France during the war, but was primarily chosen to represent the Resistance. Levy, the granddaughter of the former Chief Rabbi Alfred Lévy, was chosen at the insistence of Adolphe Caen. To the Jews the ceremony of 11 November 1945 symbolized that after their rejection during the Vichy era they had now been re-accepted as members of the French community.

A sixteenth body was added on 9 March 1952 in vault 2 to commemorate victims of the fighting in the Far East.

On 26 April 1954 an urn was deposited in the vault holding ashes taken from concentration camps.

Vault 9 was originally left empty and reserved for the last living Companion of the Liberation. Upon the death of the second before last in November 2020, it became Hubert Germain, who died in October 2021 aged 101; he was buried there on 11 November 2021 (Remembrance Day).

The tombs contain:

Recess	Occupant	Description
#1	Boutie Diasso Kal (1919-1940)	Soldier from Senegal
#2	Edmond Grethen (1898-1945)	Inspector from Indo China. (Body added in 1952.)
#3	Raymond Anne (1922-1944)	Member of French Resistance
#4	Maboulkede (1921-1944)	Soldier of the Free French Army
#5	Berty Albrecht (1893-1943)	Member of the resistance who committed suicide after torture in Fresnes prison
#6	Maurice Debout (1914-1944)	Prisoner of war
#7	Pierre Ulmer (1916-1940)	Soldier of 1940
#8	Georges Brière (1922-1944)	Sailor from the Marines
#9	Hubert Germain (1920-2021)	Last living Compagnon de la Libération. (Vault left empty until his death.)
#10	Alfred Touny (1886-1944)	Member of the Resistance
#11	Jean Charrier (1920-1944)	Infantry soldier
#12	Allal Ould M'Hamed Ben Semers (1920-1944)	Soldier from Morocco
#13	Mohamed Amar Hedhili Ben Salem Ben Hadj (1913-1940)	Soldier from Tunisia
#14	Henri Arnaud (1907-1944)	French Air Force
#15	Maurice Duport (1919-1944)	22nd North African Battalion
#16	Antonin Mourgues (1919-1942)	Marine from France's Pacific possessions
#17	Renée Lévy (1919-1942)	Member of the Resistance

== Sculptures ==
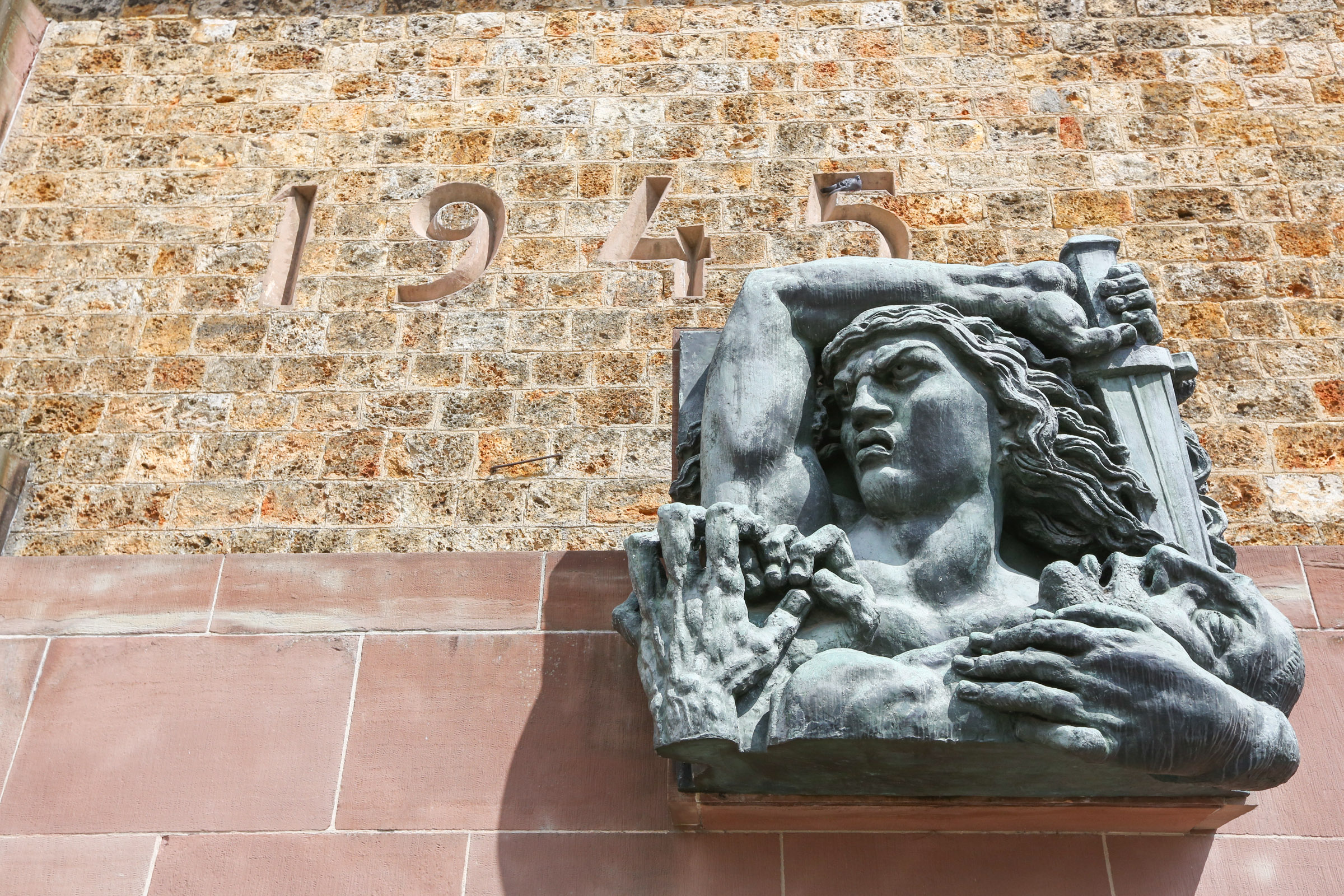
One of the 16 sculptures

The 16 sculptures, each by different sculptors, are arranged in groups of 8 on each side of the Cross of Lorraine.

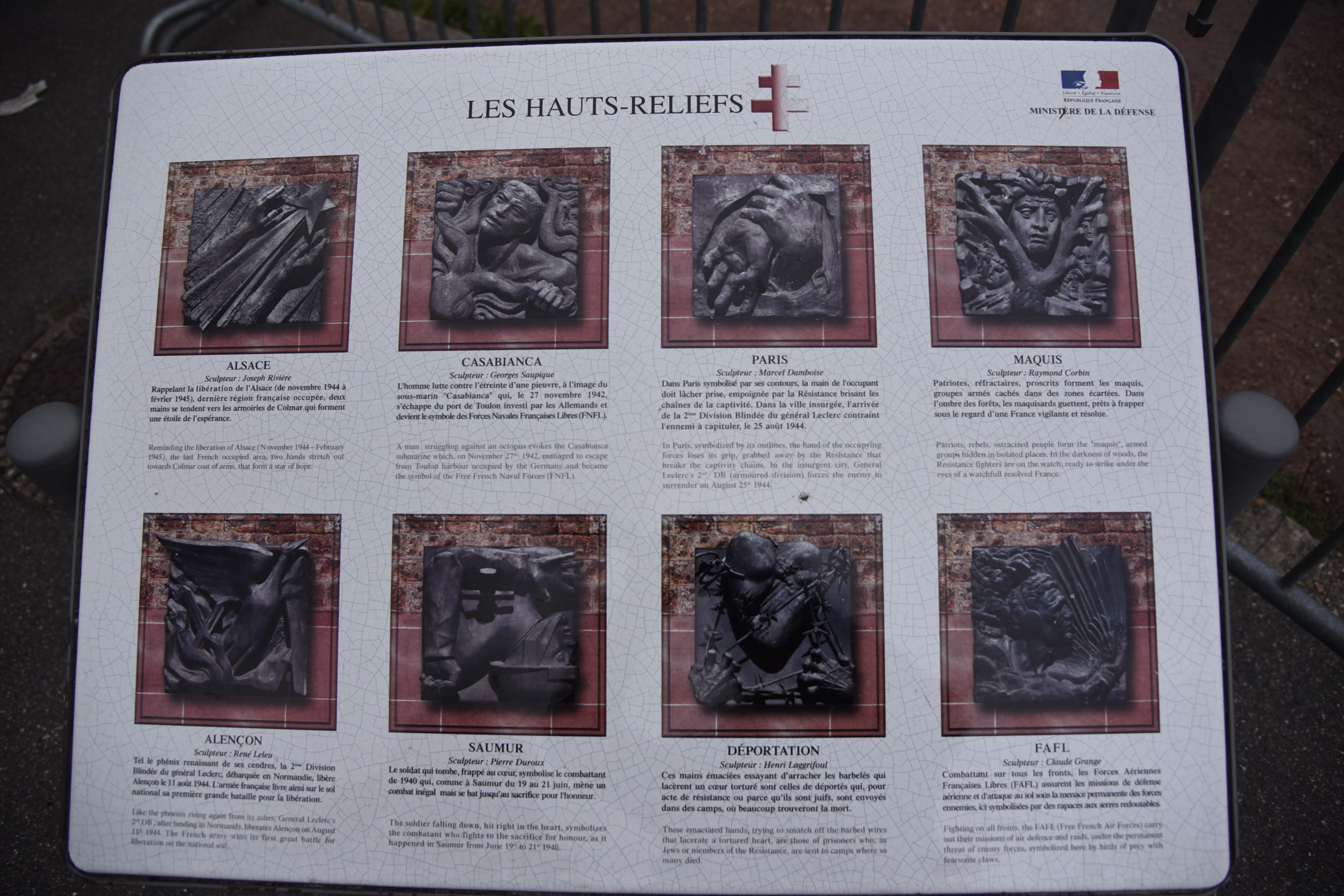
Plaques with images of all the scuplures

They are:

Sculpture	Sculptor	Commemorates
"Alsace"	Joseph Rivière	Liberation of Alsace from November 1944 to February 1945
"Casabianca"	Georges Saupique	Escape of the submarine Casabianca from Toulon on 27 November 1942
"Paris"	Marcel Damboise	Liberation of Paris 25 August 1944.
"Maquis"	Raymond Corbin	Actions of the "maquisards".
"Alençon"	René Leleu	Normandy Landing, action of Leclerc's 2nd Division, liberation of Alençon on 11 August 1944.
"Saumur"	Pierre Duroux	The fighting in Saumur from 19–21 June 1940, part of the "Battle of France."
"Déportation"	Henri Lagriffoul	Deportees to concentration and extermination camps.
"FAFL"	Claude Grange	Forces of the Free French Airforce
"Action"	Alfred Janniot	General de Gaulle's speech of 18 June when he refuses an armistice.
"Fezzan"	André Bizette-Lindet	General Leclerc's taking of the Koufra oasis and conquering of Fezzan.
"Fusillés"	Maurice Calka.	Members of the Resistance and hostages, French and foreigners, shot between 1940 and 1944.
"Cassino"	Ulysse Gemignani	Contribution of General Juin and his forces to the taking of Monte Cassino.
"Bir Hakeim"	Raymond Martin.	Action of the 1st Brigade Free French Army defending Bir Hakeim in Libya from 27 May to 10 June 1942.
"Narvik"	Robert Juvin	The French Expeditionary Force's action in Norway.
"Sienne"	René Andrei.	Liberation of Sienna on 3 July 1944.
"Rhin"	Louis Dideron	French Army's repulse of the German offensive at Strasbourg and the freeing of the Rhine.

== Sources ==
- Amsellem, Patrick (2007). Remembering the Past, Constructing the Future. The Memorial to the Deportation in Paris and Experimental Commemoration After the Second World War. ISBN 978-0-549-09943-7.
- Clifford, Rebecca (2013-08-01). Commemorating the Holocaust: The Dilemmas of Remembrance in France and Italy. Oxford University Press. ISBN 978-0-19-967981-2.
- Field, Andrew; Grehan, John; Mace, Martin (2012-12-19). Unearthing Churchill's Secret Army: The Official List of SOE Casualties and Their Stories. Casemate Publishers. ISBN 978-1-78337-664-3.
- Golsan, Richard (2012-11-12). The Papon Affair: Memory and Justice on Trial. Routledge. ISBN 978-1-136-74970-4.
- Henri Frenay. Éditions Larousse.
- "Le Mémorial de la France combattante - Historique". Mont-Valérien.
- "Le Mont-Valérien, Haut lieu de la mémoire nationale". French Ministry of Defense.
- "Le Mont Valérien". Ordre de la Libération.
- "Les seize hauts reliefs". Le Mont-Valérien.
- "La crypte du mémorial de la France combattante". Le Mont-Valérien.
- Rosenfeld, Alvin H. (1997-11-22). Thinking about the Holocaust: After Half a Century. Indiana University Press. ISBN 0-253-11254-0.
