= Marcel Mayer =

French artist

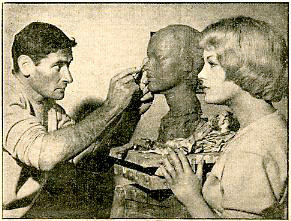
- Marcel Mayer working on a bust of Romy Schneider (1938–1982)
- Born: Grenoble, France
- Occupation: Sculptor

Marcel Mayer is a French artist whose work includes sculpture, painting and engraving. He has worked in France, the United States and India, and has completed many private and public commissions.

== Life ==
Marcel Mayer was born in Grenoble. His family was of Spanish-Portuguese origin. His grandfather was a painter and decorator, and his mother was a painter as well as a musician and singer. Mayer studied at the Lycee Vaucanson engineers' college in Grenoble, but decided to become a sculptor. During World War II (1939–45) Mayer was imprisoned in Germany and then in Rava-Ruska, Ukraine. After he returned to France, for seven years the city of Nice let him use a studio in the Villa Paradiso which had been used as a replacement for the Villa Medici in Rome during the war. He completed several commissions of memorials to the French Resistance.

Mayer became a friend of Countess Marie de Saint Exupery, mother of the author Antoine de Saint-Exupéry (1900–44), who commissioned him to make a bust of her son from photographs. He held his first exhibition in Paris with an introduction written by Albert Camus. Baroness Alix de Rothschild commissioned various works after seeing the exhibition. He also received a commission to sculpt a bust of the actress Romy Schneider. Mayer traveled to the US where he lived for several years, based in Taos, New Mexico. He taught, lectured and exhibited in one-man shows and group shows in New York, Dallas, Denver, Santa Fe and other cities. He returned to Europe, and continued to execute private and public commissions, as well as teaching.

== Work ==
Mayer has worked in a wide range of media including granite, woodcuts, monotypes, oil paintings and watercolors. In the 1960s in Taos Mayer developed a new technique with printing ink, borrowing from engraving and calligraphy. In Province in 1976 he used this technique for a series of large works drawing on various different religious traditions. About 30 pieces have been made in this series. In 1974 he made a bust of Louis Armstrong for the Nice International Jazz Festival, which stands in the garden of Arènes de Cimiez. In 1983 he made the stele of the Marshals of France for the city of Nice.

== Sources ==
- "Historique". Lumiére et Ténèbres de Mayer.
- "Marcel Mayer à Nice". Le Comte de Nice.
- May, Myriam (2015). "Portfolio for Marcel Mayer". Commissionaportrait.
