= Renée Lévy =

French Resistance member during World War II

Renée Léa Lévy
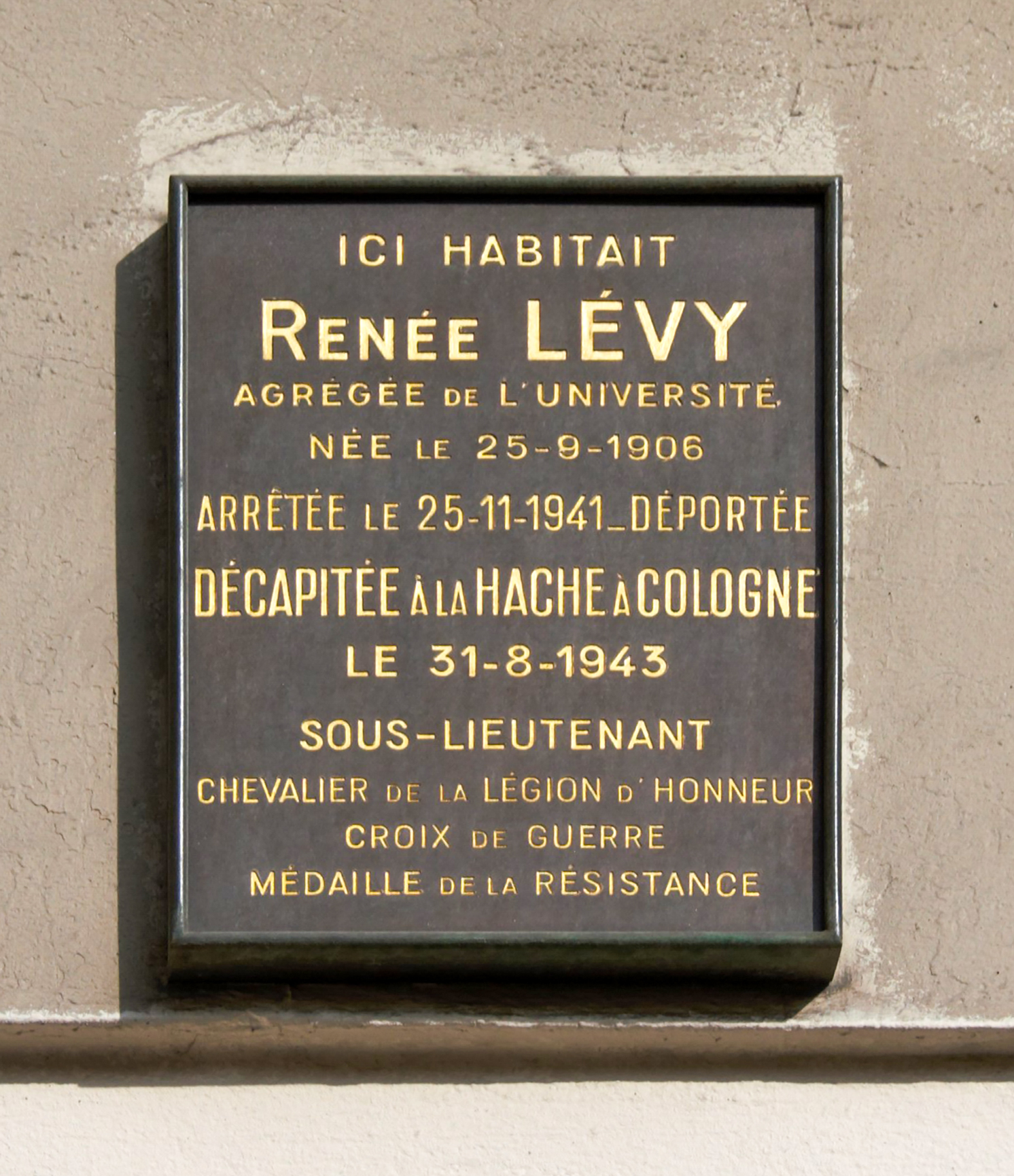
- Born: 26 September 1906; Auxerre
- Died: 31 August 1943 (aged 36); Cologne, Germany
- Occupation: School teacher
- Known for: French Resistance

Renée Léa Lévy (26 September 1906 – 31 August 1943) was a French school teacher of Jewish origins. During World War II (1939–45) she became a member of the French Resistance, was arrested and was later executed. She received several posthumous honors.

== Early years ==
Renée Léa Lévy was born in Auxerre on 25 September 1906. Her grandfather was Alfred Lévy, Chief Rabbi of France from 1907 to 1919. Her father, who died when she was four, was one of the founders of the first association of French secondary school teachers. Her mother, Bertha Levy, was involved in promoting the École normale supérieure (teachers' training college) at Sèvres. In 1912 Bertha Levy was appointed professor of Humanities at the Lycée Victor Hugo, Paris. Renée Lévy attended the Lycée Victor Hugo, then went on to study at the Sorbonne, where she received her Agrégation (higher teacher's licence) in Classical Literature in 1932. Renée Lévy was appointed a teacher at the girls' secondary school in Lille, and then was transferred to the Lycée Victor Duruy in Paris. She next moved to the Lycée Victor Hugo, where she had formerly been a student, and taught Greek and Latin.

== World War II ==
During World War II (1939–45) Paris was occupied by the Germans under the Nazi regime. On 4 October 1940 the first anti-Jewish decree was promulgated prohibiting Jews from public office, and Renée Lévy was forced to leave the school. Renée Lévy was offered refuge in a village in the Alps by some friends, but decided to remain in Paris and joined the resistance group called the Groupe du musée de l'Homme ("Museum of Man Group"). She distributed leaflets and journals, including the speech by Winston Churchill of 21 October 1940 in which he said "Gather your strength for the dawn, for the dawn will come." She distributed the clandestine paper Résistance. She tried to recruit André Becker, but he did not take the musée de l'Homme very seriously and did not respond. He was later active in the resistance. After her group was disbanded she joined the Hector network. Using a radio transmitter hidden in her home, Renée Lévy sent information about German equipment and troop movements to London.

Renée Lévy was denounced, and was arrested by the Germans on 25 October 1941. She was held in La Santé Prison in Paris, then on 11 February 1942 was transferred to Germany under the Nacht und Nebel ("Night and Fog") decree, which removed prisoners without trace. She was imprisoned in Aachen and then in Essen. She was brought before a court in Koblenz on 30 April 1943 and sentenced to death. She was executed by decapitation at Cologne on 31 August 1943. Her mother and sister were also deported in 1943. Only her mother survived.

== Posthumous honors ==
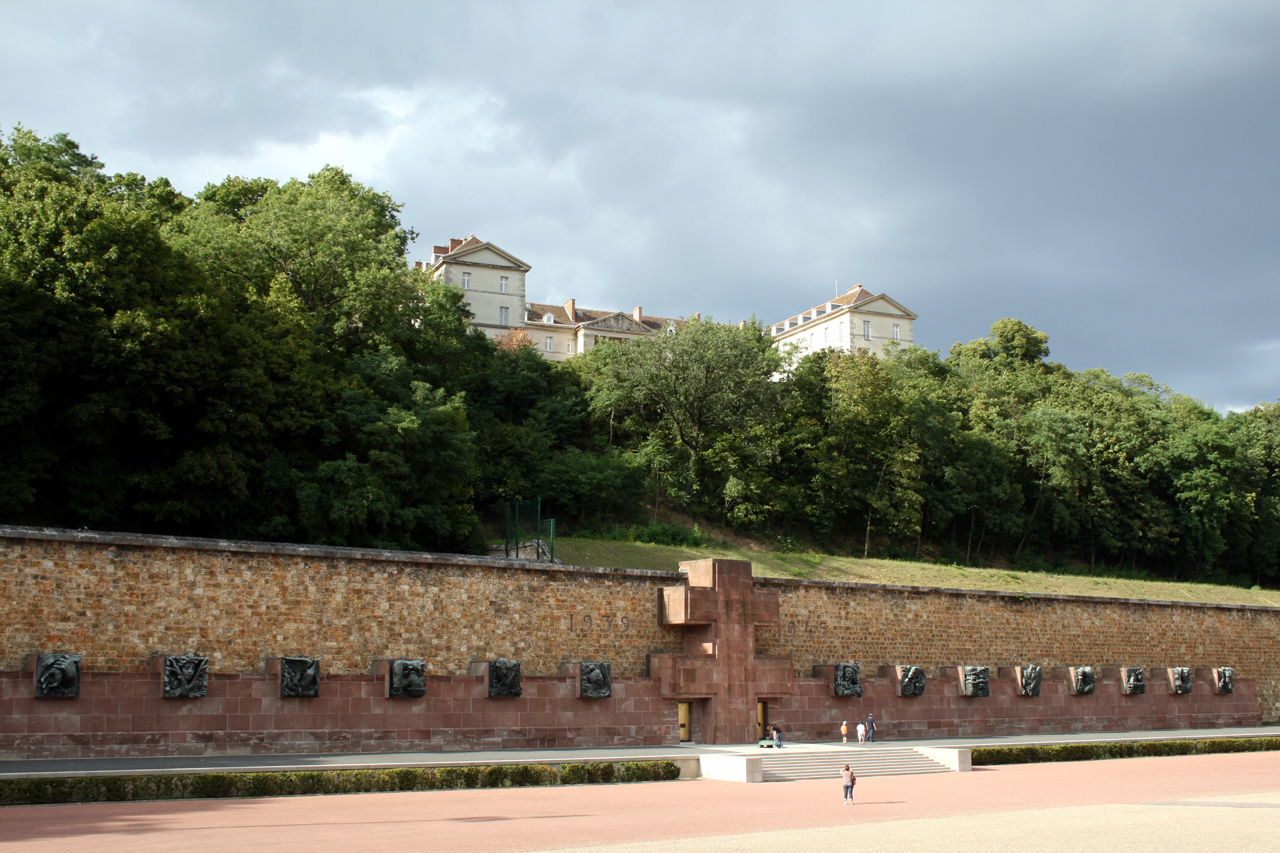
Mont Valérien Mémorial de la France combattante (2009)

After the war Renée Lévy's remains were returned to France and buried at Fort Mont-Valérien in Suresnes during an impressive ceremony on 11 November 1945. Fifteen resistance fighters were reburied during the ceremony, including two women – Renée Lévy and Berty Albrecht. The fifteen bodies, which had been kept at the Arc de Triomphe beside the grave of the Unknown Soldier, had great symbolic importance, representing the dead of the different battles. Eleven had died "facing the enemy" and four represented the martyrs of France. (Note: The present Mont-Valérien war memorial was erected later, inaugurated on 18 June 1960.) The presence of Renée Levy symbolized the re-acceptance of the Jews as a part of the nation, after their exclusion during the Vichy period. Of at least equal importance, she and Raymond Bigosse represented the deported resisters.

Renée Lévy was made a Chevalier of the Legion of Honour and was awarded the Croix de Guerre and the Resistance Medal. A 1.60 franc postage stamp in her honor was issued from November 1983 to October 1984.

== Sources ==
- Clifford, Rebecca (2013-08-01). Commemorating the Holocaust: The Dilemmas of Remembrance in France and Italy. Oxford University Press. ISBN 978-0-19-967981-2.
- Levi, Paolo Momigliano (1996). Storia e memoria della deportazione: modelli di ricerca e di comunicazione in Italia e in Francia. Casa Editrice Giuntina. ISBN 978-88-8057-034-9.
- "LEVY Renée". Université de Provence.
- "Memorial tablet for Renée Lévy (1906 - 1943) Outside the entrance to No. 6, rue de Normandie, Paris". The Second World War.
- Pichon, Muriel (2009). Les Français juifs, 1914-1950: récit d'un désenchantement. Presses Univ. du Mirail. ISBN 978-2-85816-996-2.
- "Renée Levy 1906-1943 Héroïnes de la Résistance - Timbre de 1983". Phil Ouest.
- Rosenfeld, Alvin H. (1997-11-22). Thinking about the Holocaust: After Half a Century. Indiana University Press. ISBN 0-253-11254-0.
