= Joseph Rivière (sculptor) =

French sculptor

- Born: 5 May 1912; Tours, Indre-et-Loire, France
- Died: 10 February 1961 (aged 48); Paris, France
- Occupation: Sculptor
- Known for: monument to the dead deminers of the Ballon d'Alsace

Joseph Rivière (French pronunciation: [ʒozɛf ʁivjɛʁ]; 5 April 1912 – 10 February 1961) was a French sculptor. His work is held in various public places in France. His best known work is the monument to the dead deminers of the Ballon d'Alsace.

== Early years ==
Joseph Rivière was born in Tours on 5 April 1912. His father was Michel Rivière, a career soldier who was transferred to Bordeaux two months after the birth of his son. Joseph attended the Lycée Michel Montaigne in Bordeaux for his secondary education. He attended the École des Beaux-Arts of Bordeaux, and studied sculpture under Charles Louis Malric from 1930 to 1933. He also studied drawing under François-Maurice Roganeau. He received several prizes in 1932, including first prize in statuary sculpture. That year the city of Bordeaux gave him a travel grant that let him visit the northern provinces of Spain. After returning he worked for an advertising agency producing cement statues to promote tourism.

In 1933 he received a mention from the École des Beaux-Arts and was received by the Salon des Artistes Français. He continued to receive many awards. At the end of 1933 he performed his military service at Versailles in the railways. After his discharge in 1934 he enrolled in the École nationale supérieure des Beaux-Arts where he worked in the studio of Jean Boucher. He received an honorable mention from the Salon in 1935.

In 1937 Rivière won the Chevanard prize with the support of Charles Despiau, who sat on the jury. He made several works for the Guyenne and Gascogne pavilion at the 1937 Exposition Internationale des Arts et Techniques dans la Vie Moderne. Rivière and Roger Courroy made two large urns that represent agriculture and forestry of Landes. The Salon awarded him a silver medal in 1938. He received a government grant that year that let him tour the cathedrals of the Île-de-France that year. While at the École Nationale des Beaux-Arts he met Jacques Gestalder, Emile Gilioli and Raymond Veysset, but is more often linked to the sculptors René Leleu and Noël Papet. In 1939 he made a bust of Ferdinand Barbaud that was placed in the horse abattoir of Paris, and a bust of Dr. Rouhet that was erected at Montségur on 2 July 1939.

== World War II ==
At the outbreak of World War II in September 1939, Rivière was mobilized and joined the engineer service at Thionville. He was given permission to marry Lucienne Michot on 9 March 1940. He was taken prisoner in June 1940 and taken to Trier in Germany. The commander allowed him to work with the German sculptor Anton Nagel while still a prisoner of war. The two made various religious works. Rivière's health broke down, and in March 1941 he was repatriated to France. He took a few months rest in Bordeaux, then returned to Paris. He participated in the 1941 Salon, and continued to work in his studio in Paris through the war.

== Later career ==
Rivière was one of the founders of the Salon de la Jeune Sculpture, along with Denys Chevalier and Pierre Descargues. The new salon opened in 1948. His work was also part of the sculpture event in the art competition at the 1948 Summer Olympics. In 1949 he became professor of sculpture at the Académie Julian. His most famous work is his monument to the dead deminers of the Ballon d'Alsace (1952). In 1957 Joseph Rivière was made Chevalier of Arts and Letters and in 1959 Knight of the Legion of Honour. He created one of the bronze sculptures for the Mémorial de la France combattante at Mont Valérien in 1960. The work, titled "Colmar", depicts two hands that reach to the city of Colmar, Haut-Rhin, and that also form a Star of Hope. It was not until 9 February 1945 and the end of the Battle of the Colmar Pocket that Alsace was finally liberated.

Joseph Rivière died on 10 February 1961 at the age of 48. He is buried in the new cemetery of Boulogne-Billancourt.

== Exhibitions and collections ==
After World War II Rivière participated in many salons and exhibitions. These included:

- 1948 England, where he won a bronze medal for his "Walking Athlete"
- 1952, 1953, 1955, 1958, Exhibitions in Germany
- 1953, solo exhibition at the galerie Simone Badinier in Paris.
- 1955–58, Salons Comparaisons
- 1955, 1956, 1957, Salons des Peintres Témoins de leur Temps
- 1956, exhibition organized by the city of Bordeaux
- 1956 Exposition Internationale de Sculpture Contemporaine organised by the Musée Rodin

The works of Joseph Rivière are held by the Musée National d'Art Moderne, Musée des beaux-arts de la ville de Paris, and museums of Bordeaux, Albi, Sèvres and Algiers. He made decorative figures in the Château de Rambouillet and the Élysée Palace.

== Gallery ==
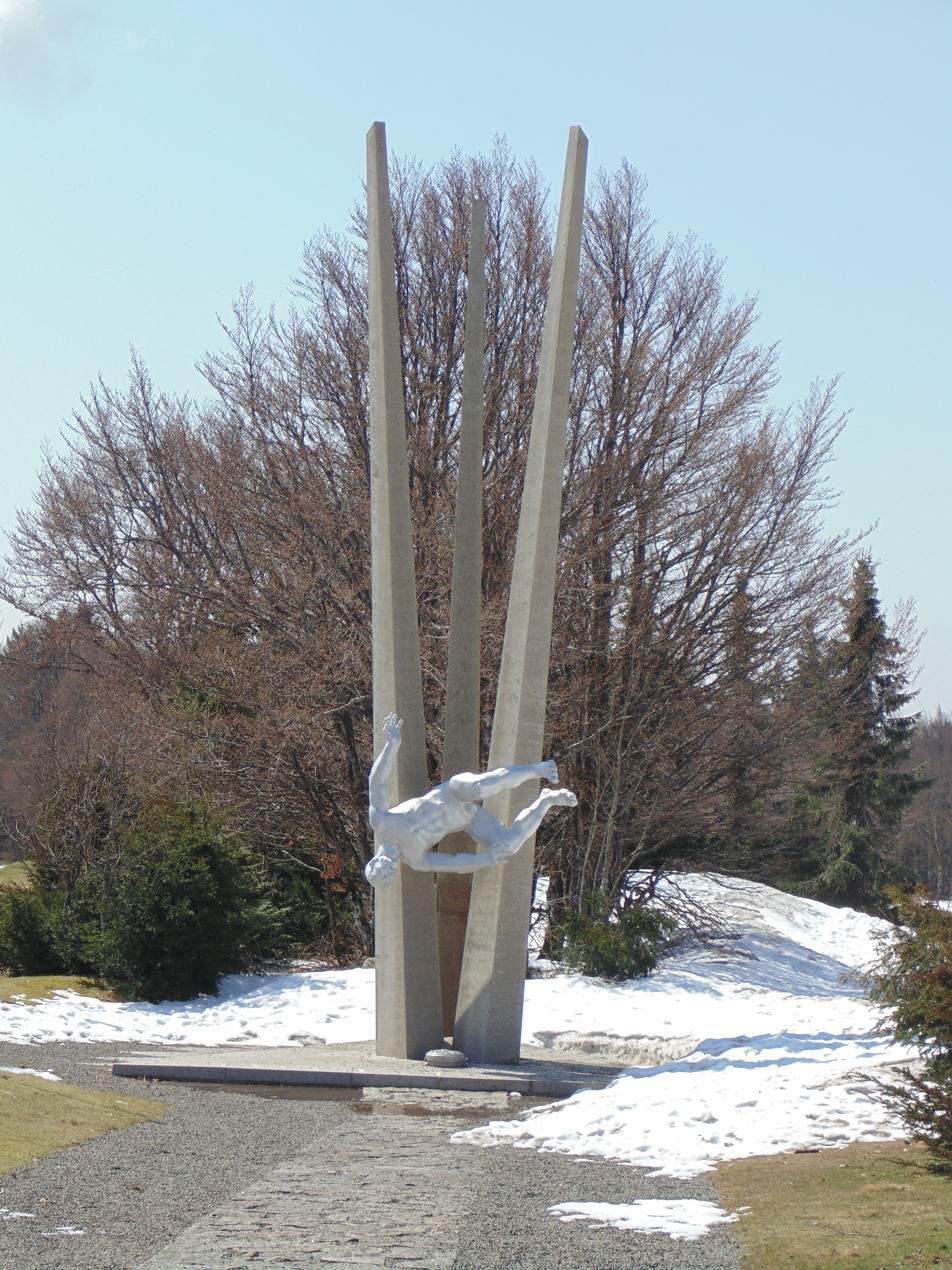
Deminers monument at Ballon d'Alsace

== Sources ==
- "Joseph Rivière". Galerie Martel Greiner.
- "Joseph RIVIERE (1912–1961)". H cotation. Archived from the original on 2014-11-29.
- "Joseph Rivière (Tours 1912 – Paris 1961)". Louis Emié. December 2006.
- Landru, Philippe (2008-12-31). "BOULOGNE-BILLANCOURT (92) : nouveau cimetière". Cimetières de France et d’ailleurs.
- "Les seize hauts reliefs". Le Mont-Valérien.
