= Alfred Lévy =

French rabbi (1840–1919)

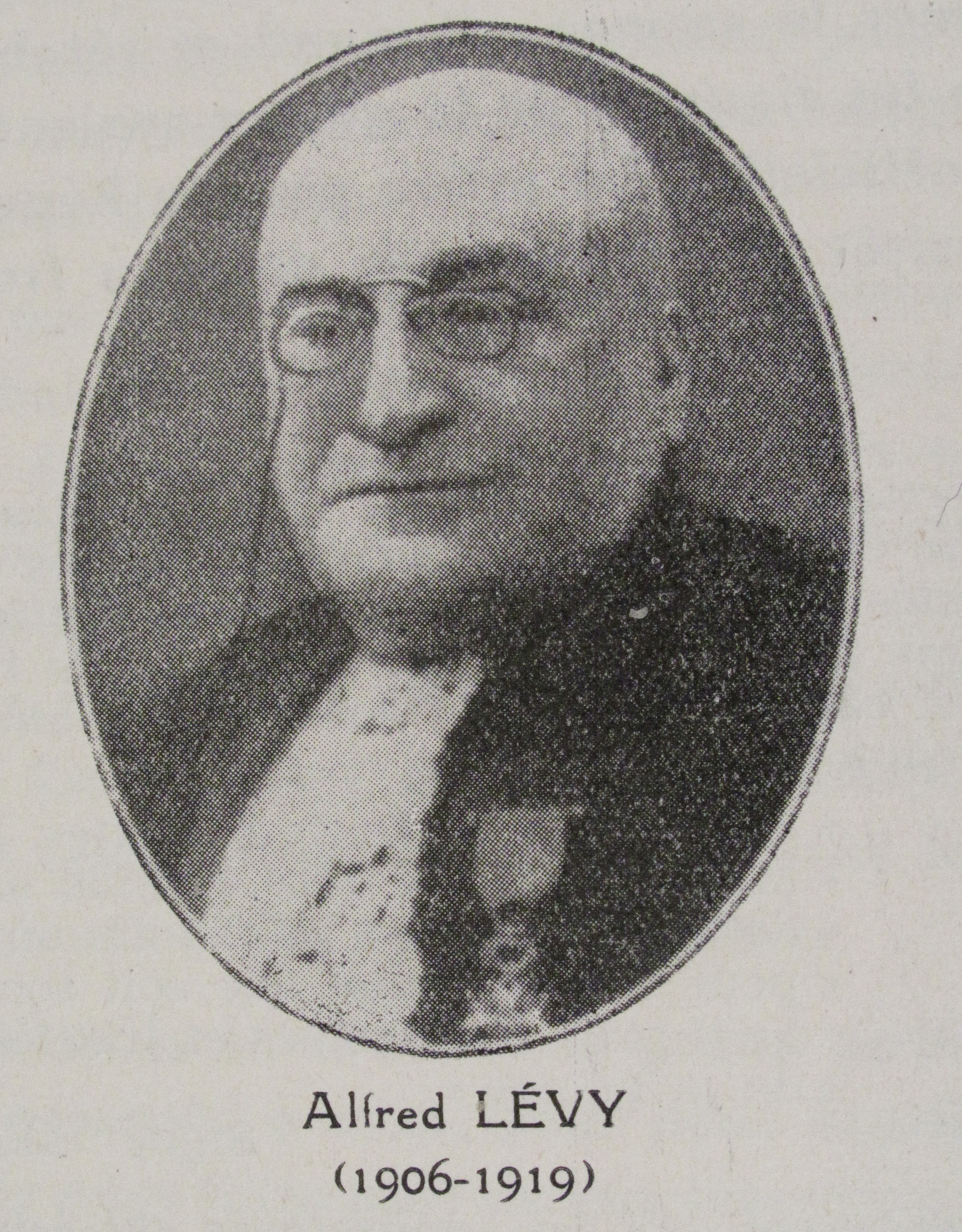
- Born: 14 December 1840; Lunéville, France
- Died: 23 July 1919 (aged 78); Pau, Pyrénées-Atlantiques, France
- Occupation: Rabbi
- Known for: Chief Rabbi of France

Alfred Lévy (French pronunciation: [alfʁɛd levi]; 14 December 1840 – 23 July 1919) was a French rabbi who became Chief Rabbi of France in the period immediately before and during World War I.

== Life ==
Alfred Lévy was born in Lunéville on 14 December 1840. He studied at the Collège de Lunéville and in 1860 entered the Rabbinical Seminary of Paris. On completing his studies he became rabbi at Dijon for two years, and then was rabbi of Lunéville for twelve years. In 1880 he became chief rabbi of the consistory of Lyon. In that role, in July 1880 he was named a member of the public education committee of the department of the Rhone. He came to be known as a philanthropist, a French patriot and an eloquent speaker. He was made a chevalier of the Legion of Honor in 1888.

In 1907 Lévy succeeded Zadoc Kahn as head of the central consistory, and thus as Chief Rabbi of France. The election was opposed by one other candidate, Israël Lévi, who was appointed Deputy Chief Rabbi in 1914. At the start of World War I (1914–18) Alfred Lévy established a list of military chaplains. Each year of the war he published the soldier's Tefila, ritual prayers for use by Israelite soldiers on campaign. His health deteriorated during the last two years of the war, and Israël Lévi acted as Chief Rabbi of France in his place.

Alfred Lévy died at Pau, Pyrénées-Atlantiques on 23 July 1919 and was buried in Montparnasse Cemetery in Paris. In 1923 his grandson Robert Gamzon founded the first chapter of the Éclaireurs Israélites de France (EIF) in Paris. This scouting organization brought together native-born and immigrant Jewish youth, and affirmed their Jewish identity. Alfred Lévy's granddaughter Renée Lévy (1906–1943) aided the Resistance during World War II and was executed by the Germans. She is one of the 16 representatives of Fighting France who is buried at the Mémorial de la France combattante.

== Publications ==
Lévy's publications include:

- Le Deuil et les Cérémonies Funèbres chez les Israélites Paris, 1879
- Notice sur les Israélites du Duché de Lorraine 1885
- Notice sur les Israélites de Lyon 1894
- Les Doctrines d'Israel, Recueil de Sermons Lyons, 1896.

== Sources ==
- "Alfred Levy" (in French). Le judaïsme d'Alsace et de Lorraine - ASIJA.
- Hyman, Paula (1998). The Jews of Modern France. University of California Press. ISBN 978-0-520-91929-7.
- "Lévy, Alfred". Jewish Encyclopedia. 1906.
- L.G. (1890-12-21). "M. Alfred Lévy Grand Rabbin". Revue lyonnaise illustrée: Artistique et littéraire (in French). Revue lyonnaise illustrée.
- Ministère de l'éducation nationale (1880). Bulletin officiel (in French). Impr. Nationale.
- Rosenfeld, Alvin H. (1997-11-22). Thinking about the Holocaust: After Half a Century. Indiana University Press. ISBN 0-253-11254-0.
