= Villa Paradiso =

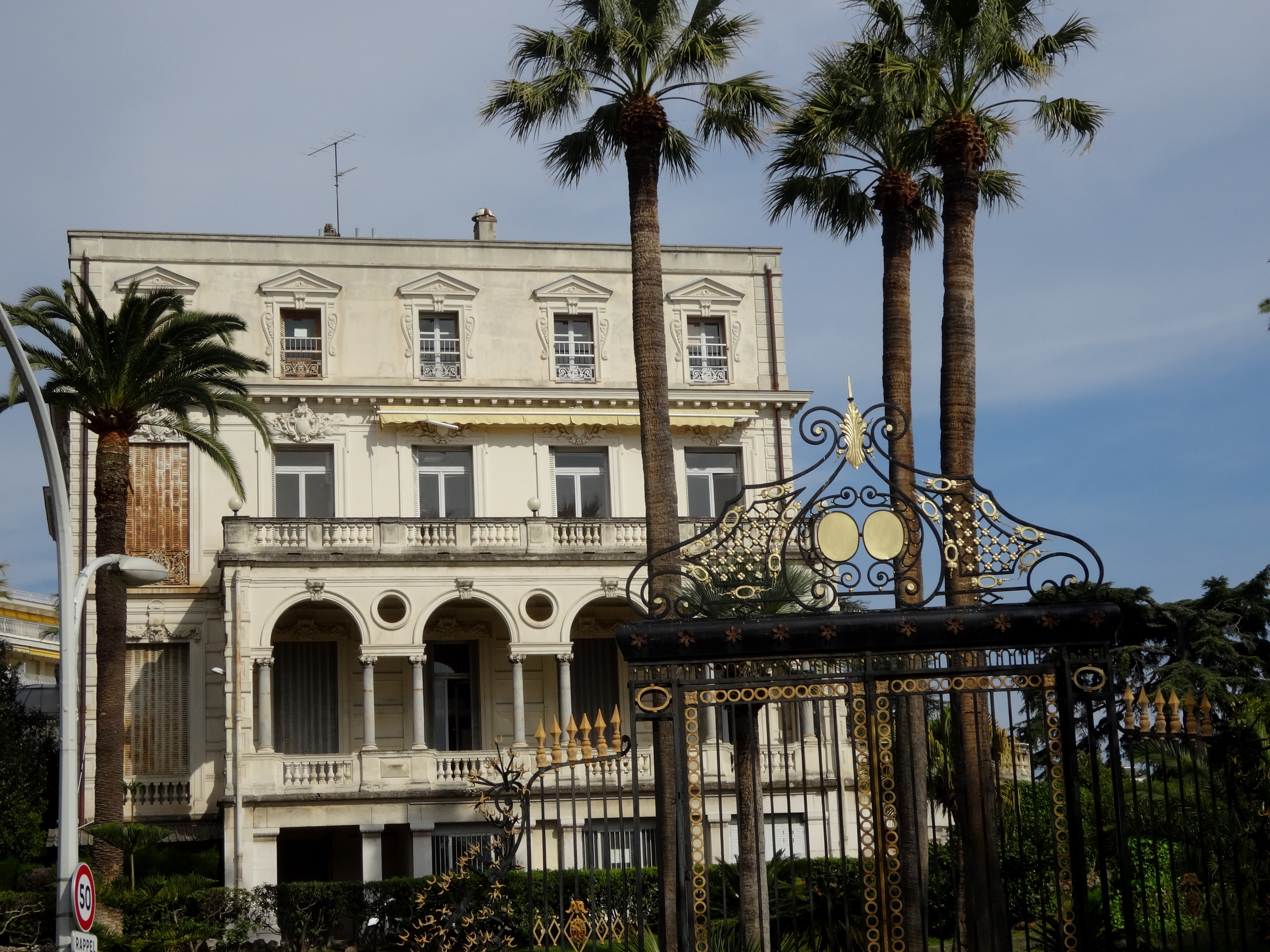

- Location within France

General information
- Type: Villa
- Location: 24 Boulevard de Cimiez, Nice, France
- Coordinates: 43.709431°N 7.271281°E
- Completed: c. 1900

Design and construction
- Architect: Constantin Scala

The Villa Paradiso (or Paradisio) is a large villa in Nice, France built at the start of the 20th century by the architect Constantin Scala. During World War II (1939–45) it was used by the Académie française for its Prix de Rome scholars. The villa continues to be used for cultural purposes.

== Location ==
The Villa Paradiso was built around 1900 by the architect Constantin Scala for the baroness Hélène van Zuylen, née de Rothschild. It is an imposing building surrounded by a large garden. The property is in the north of the old city of Nice, almost 200 metres (660 ft) east of the Musée Marc Chagall. The grounds cover 1.6 hectares (4.0 acres). After World War II (1939–45) various public facilities were added including a children's playground and an outdoor amphitheater. In spring the park blooms with many flowers in different colors.

== Académie française ==
The Académie de France en Rome left the Villa Medici in 1940 during the war. The next year, at the instigation of Jérôme Carcopino, the academy took up residence in Nice at the Villa Paradiso. Its public rooms and huge stables were hastily converted into studios for the artists. These were the architect Bernard Zehrfuss, who won the Grand Prix de Rome for architecture in 1939 and led the Oppède group, and Pierre-Robert Lucas, who won the Grand prix de Rome for painting in 1937. René Leleu, who won the Grand Prix de Rome for sculpture in 1939, worked at the Villa Paradiso and then in Fontainebleau.

== Later use ==
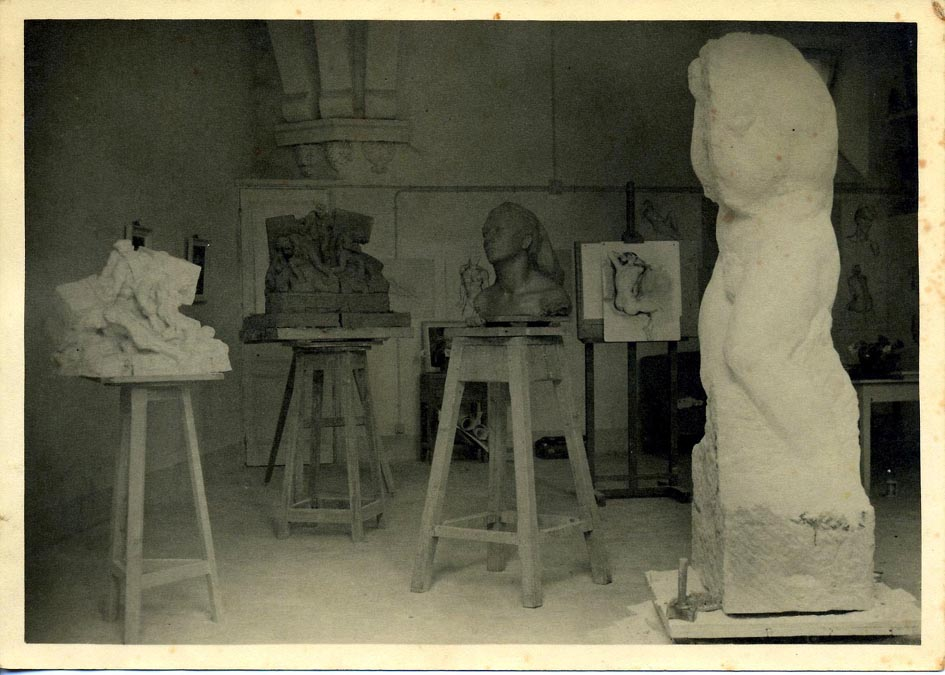
One of the studies when occupied by the sculptor Marcel Mayer just after the war

The villa and grounds became the property of the city of Nice after the war. The city let the sculptor Marcel Mayer use one of the studios, where he executed various public commissions for seven years. He had been imprisoned in Germany and then in Rava-Ruska, Ukraine during the war. In the late 1940s the Nice Conservatory was installed at the Villa Paradiso. From 1957 to 2006 the Académie Internationale d'Eté de Nice (Nice International Summer Academy) was held at the Villa Paradiso in the premises of the conservatory. As of 2015 the city's Direction centrale de l'education was housed in the building.

== Sources ==
- "90 ans d'histoire". Conservatoire National à Rayonnement Régional.
- "Historique". Académie Internationale d'Eté de Nice.
- "Les métamorphoses de l'art". archives du nord.
- "Les Palais & Villas de Nice (3e partie)". 2011-12-05.
- "Marcel Mayer à Nice". Le Comte de Nice.
- Moulin, Jean (2014). "Nice, cité-refuge ?". Conseil général des Alpes-Maritimes. Archived from the original on 2018-10-01.
- "Parc de la Villa Paradiso". Nice Tourism.
- "Ville de Nice, Direction centrale de l'education" (PDF). 2007.
