= Mathurin Henrio =

French resistance fighter (1929-1944)

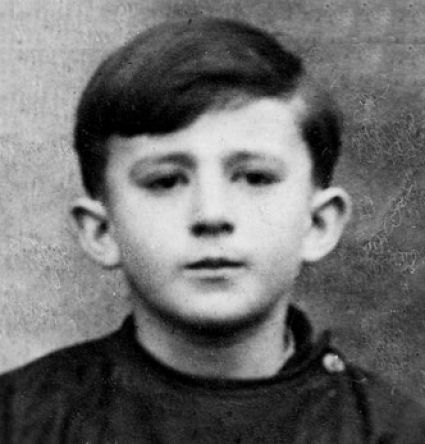
Mathurin Henrio

Mathurin Henrio (16 April 1929, in Baud – 10 February 1944, in Baud) was a young French Resistance fighter who was shot dead by German soldiers for refusing to answer questions on the whereabouts of maquisards. At age fourteen, he is the youngest recipient of the Ordre de la Libération and a recipient of the Croix de guerre 1939-45.
