= René Leleu =

French sculptor and medallist (1911–1984)

René Marie Joseph Leleu
- Born: 11 June 1911; Lille, France
- Died: June 1984; Paris, France
- Occupation: Sculptor

René Marie Joseph Leleu (11 June 1911 – June 1984) was a French sculptor and medallist.

== Life ==
René Leleu was born in Lille on 11 June 1911. He studied at the École des beaux-arts in Lille from 1927 to 1929. He was a pupil of Aimé-Gustave Blaise in Lille. Leleu then studied under Paul Landowski and Marcel Gaumont at the École nationale supérieure des Beaux-Arts in Paris. He won the Prix de Rome in 1939. Due to World War II (1939–45) he was unable to study in Rome, but was given a scholarship by the French Academy to stay at the Villa Paradiso in Nice, and then at Fontainebleau.

After the war Leleu devoted himself almost exclusively to monumental sculpture. He created the Monument à la Résistance of Bohain in 1946. He then spent seven years to complete the Minotauromachie, which he showed at the Salon de la Jeune Sculpture in 1957. He taught sculpture and art history at the École des beaux-arts in Valenciennes from 1950 to 1959. He was then made a lecturer at the U.P. d'Architecture in Rouen. René Leleu created one of the bronze sculptures for the Mémorial de la France combattante at Mont Valérien in 1960. It depicts a phoenix rising from its ashes, and represents the liberation of Alençon on 12 August 1944, the first step towards Paris and Strasbourg. He was a founding member of the Salon Comparaisons. He died in Paris in 1984.

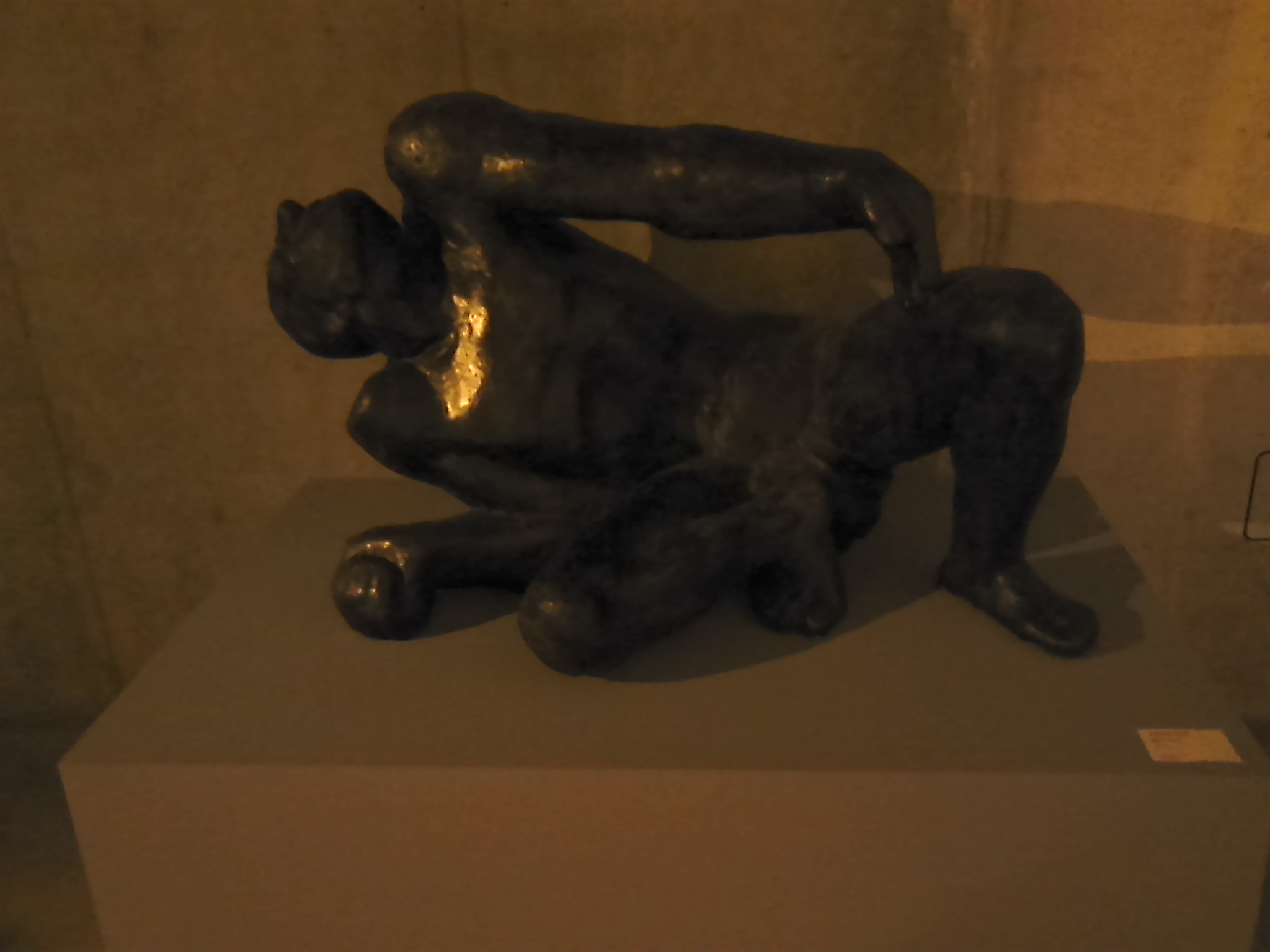
Héros mourant, Palais des beaux-arts de Lille.

== Works ==
Sculptures by Leleu include:

- Alençon, Mémorial de la France combattante, Mont Valérien
- Héros mourant, plâster, Palais des beaux-arts de Lille
- Combattant, bronze, Palais des beaux-arts de Lille
- Le Silence, gilded bronze, Musée national d'art moderne Paris
- Minotauromachie, plaster, musée des beaux-arts de Valenciennes.
- Le penseur, reconstituted stone, Lycée Branly, La Roche-sur-Yon

== Publications ==
Leleu completed Les métamorphoses de l'art in 1954. It was finally published posthumously through the efforts of Jean-Claude Poinsignon, who had organized an exhibition of Leleu's work in 1987 in the Hôtel de ville of Valenciennes.

- René Leleu (1990). Les métamorphoses de l'art. Valenciennes: Les Amis des arts de Valenciennes et du Hainaut français. p. 446.

== Sources ==
- "Les métamorphoses de l'art". archives du nord.
- "Les seize hauts reliefs". Le Mont-Valérien.
- "René Marie Joseph Leleu". H cotation. Archived from the original on 2014-11-29.
