= Hubert Germain =

French resistant and historian (1920–2021)

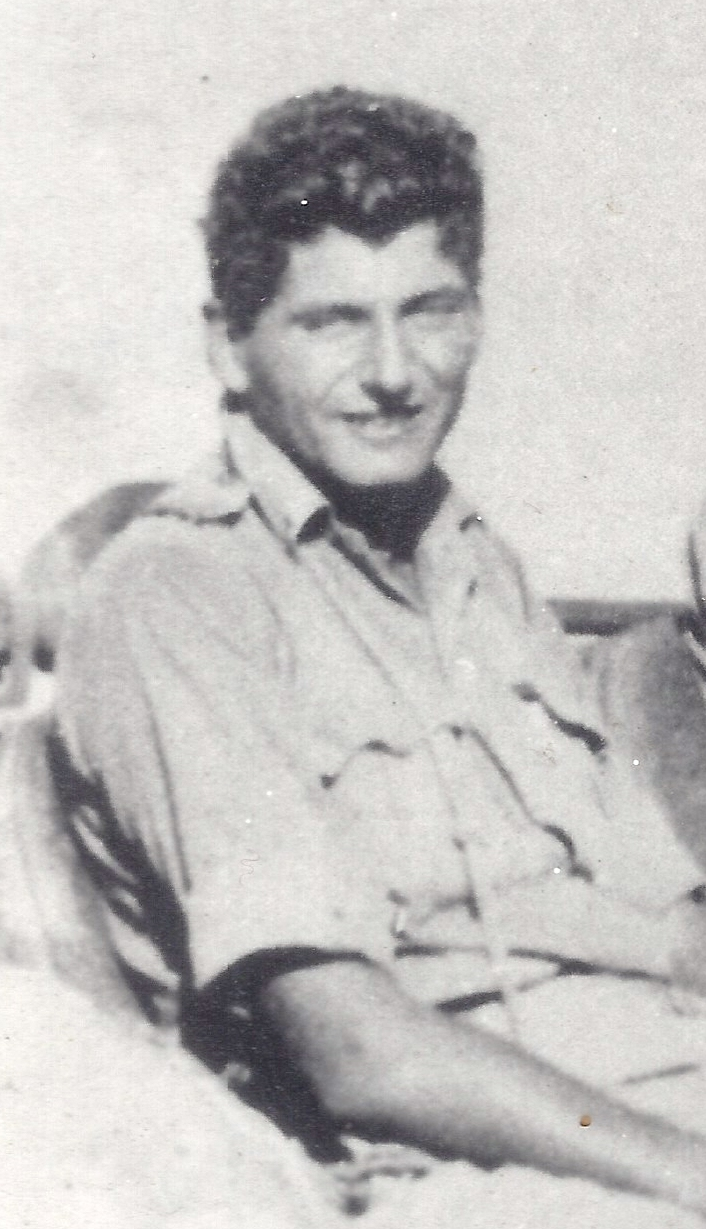
- Born: 6 August 1920; Paris, France
- Died: 12 October 2021 (aged 101); Paris
- Occupations: Resistance fighter Politician

Hubert Germain (6 August 1920 – 12 October 2021) was a French politician who was a member of the Free French Forces during World War II. He was the last living Companion of the Order of Liberation.

== Biography ==
Germain was born on 6 August 1920 in the 16th arrondissement of Paris. He was the son of General Maxime Germain. He joined the Free French Forces, and in 1942 saw action at the Battle of Bir Hakeim and the Battle of El Alamein. In early 1944 he was wounded in Italy. After his recovery he took part in Operation Dragoon, the Allied landing in Provence. Germain was appointed a Companion of the Order of Liberation on 22 November 1944. He remained in the French occupation army in Germany until 1946.

After the war, he served as mayor of Saint-Chéron between 1953 and 1965. He was deputy for Paris's 14th constituency from 1962 to 1967, from 1968 to 1972, and in 1973. He served in Pierre Messmer's government as Minister of Posts and Telecommunications. He married Simone Millon in 1945, having 3 children.

During the commemorations of the 80th anniversary of the Appeal of 18 June, British Prime Minister Boris Johnson announced that the last four Companions of the Liberation, Edgard Tupët-Thomé, Pierre Simonet, Daniel Cordier and Hubert Germain, would become Honorary Members of the Order of the British Empire. The decoration was presented to Germain by Ed Llewellyn, Ambassador of the United Kingdom to France.

After the death of Daniel Cordier on 20 November 2020, Germain became the last surviving Companion of the Order of Liberation. On 25 November 2020, he was appointed Honorary Chancellor of the Order of Liberation.

Germain died in Paris on 12 October 2021 at the age of 101. His funeral was held on 11 November 2021 (Remembrance Day), starting with a ceremony at the Arc de Triomphe. He has been buried in the crypt of the Mémorial de la France combattante, where vault 9 was reserved for the last living Companion of the Liberation since the post-war years.

== Honours ==
- Companion of the Order of Liberation
- Grand Cross of the Legion of Honour (2017).
- Croix de Guerre 1939–1945, with palms.
- Resistance Medal with rosette.
- Honorary Member of the Order of the British Empire (2020).

== See also ==
- Lazare Ponticelli (last living French veteran of World War I)
