= Vassieux-en-Vercors =

- Commune
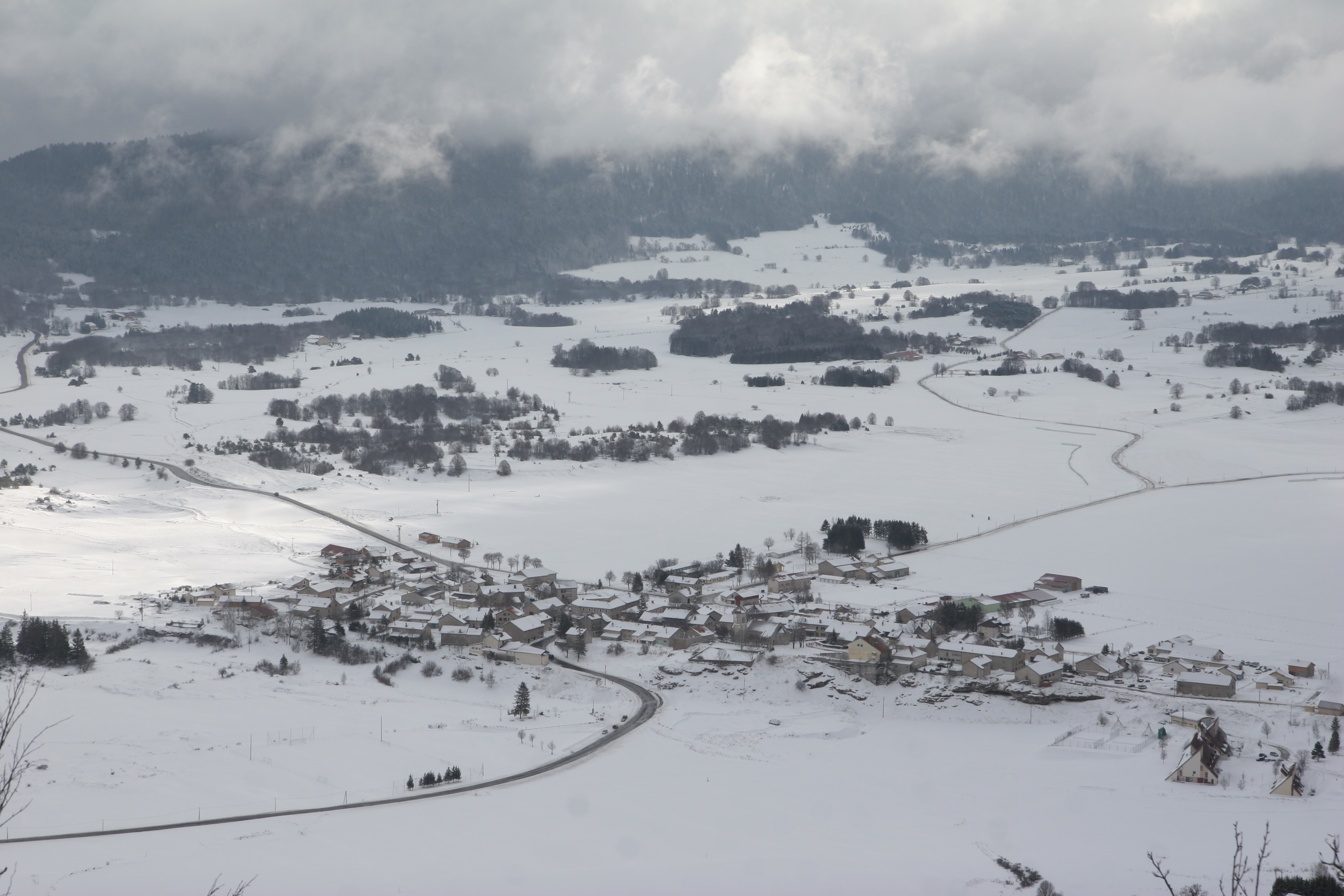
- Vassieux-en-Vercors seen from the slopes of the col de la Chau, near the Mémorial de la Résistance

- Coat of arms
- Location of Vassieux-en-Vercors
- Location within France Location within Auvergne-Rhône-Alpes
- Coordinates: 44°53′46″N 5°22′15″E
- Country: France
- Region: Auvergne-Rhône-Alpes
- Department: Drôme
- Arrondissement: Die
- Canton: Vercors-Monts du Matin

Government
  - Mayor (2020–2026): Thomas Ottenheimer
- Area^{1}: 48.25 km^{2} (18.63 sq mi)
- Elevation: 1,048 m (3,438 ft)
- Highest elevation: 1,654 m (5,427 ft)
- Lowest elevation: 1,028 m (3,373 ft)
- Population (2023): 341
  - Density: 7.07/km^{2} (18.3/sq mi)
- Time zone: UTC+01:00 (CET)
  - Summer (DST): UTC+02:00 (CEST)
- INSEE/Postal code: 26364 /26420
- ^{1} French Land Register data, which excludes lakes, ponds, glaciers > 1 km^{2} (0.386 sq mi or 247 acres) and river estuaries.

Vassieux-en-Vercors (French pronunciation: [vasjø ɑ̃ vɛʁkɔʁ], literally Vassieux in Vercors; Occitan: Vaciu de Vercòrs) is a commune in the department of Drôme in southeastern France.

The town is known for its assistance to the French Resistance during World War II, for which it was awarded the Ordre de la Libération.

== Geography ==
The village is built on a polje of limestone and dominated by a vast Karst landscape. This polje lies on a syncline generally known as the "Plateau de Vassieux".

The Plateau de Vassieux is the site of numerous other karst phenomena, such as limestone pavements and caves, which are studied and explored by local speleology groups.

== History ==
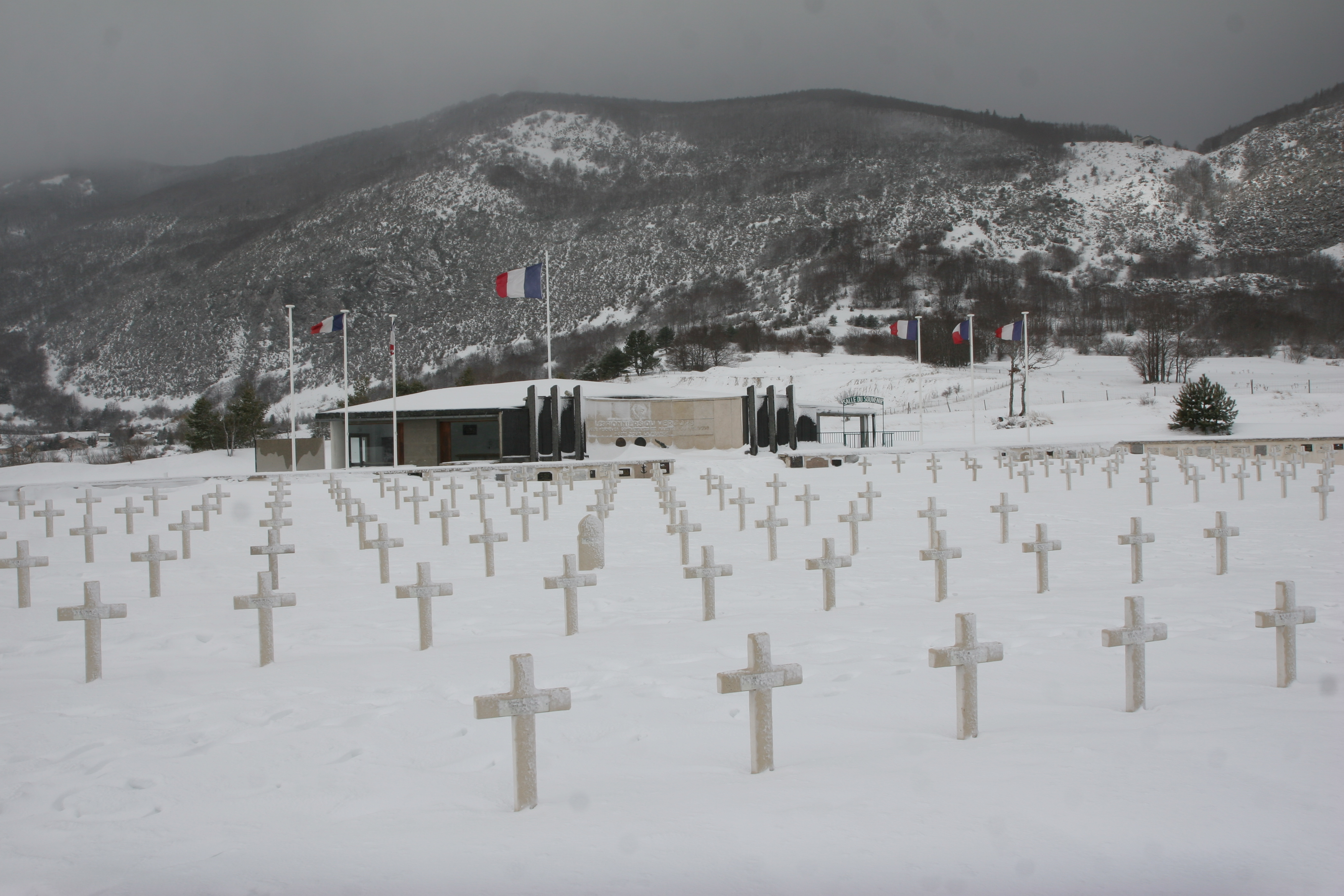
Cemetery and memorial

Vassieux-en-Vercors is home to several prehistoric archaeological sites, and has a Museum of Prehistory which was created in May 1970 after the discovery of a flintknapping workshop.

In June and July 1944, during the Second World War, the French Resistance, known as the Maquis du Vercors, staged a major uprising against the German occupation in Vercors and proclaimed the Free Republic of Vercors. It was the first democratic territory in France since the beginning of the German occupation in 1940 – the revolt was brutally suppressed. For its great acts of resistance the town was awarded the Ordre de la Libération. A memorial was built at the Col de la Chau 44.90760°N 5.36124°E to remember the grim events of the Second World War, and includes a cemetery where the victims of a July 1944 German massacre are buried.

== Population ==
Historical population
Year	Pop.	±% p.a.
1968	257	—
1975	257	+0.00%
1982	310	+2.71%
1990	283	−1.13%
1999	290	+0.27%
2007	355	+2.56%
2012	347	−0.45%
2017	313	−2.04%
2023	341	+1.44%
Source: INSEE

== Economy ==
The main human and economic activities are based on agriculture (livestock, timber etc.) and tourism.

== See also ==
- Vercors Cave System
- Vercors Plateau
- Maquis du Vercors
- Ordre de la Libération
- Communes of the Drôme department
- Parc naturel régional du Vercors
