= Order of Liberation =

Award commemorating the Liberation of France

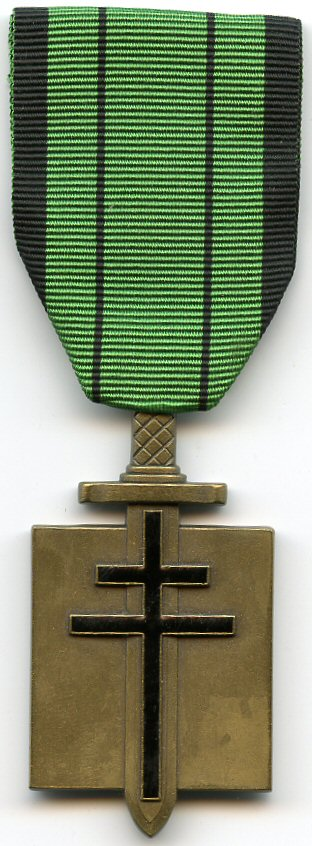
- Order of Liberation (obverse)
- Type: Single degree Order of Merit
- Established: 16 November 1940
- Awarded for: Outstanding contribution to the liberation of occupied France
- Status: No longer awarded
- Founder: Charles de Gaulle
- Website: ordredelaliberation.fr

Statistics
- First induction: 29 January 1941
- Last induction: 23 January 1946
- Total inductees: 1,038

Precedence
- Next (higher): Legion of Honour
- Next (lower): Military Medal
- Ribbon of the Order of Liberation

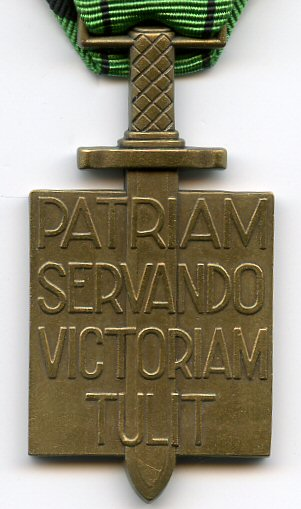
Reverse of the Order of Liberation

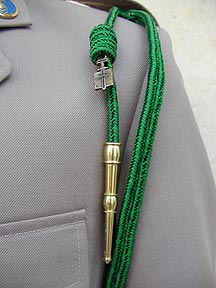
Fourragère of the Order of Liberation

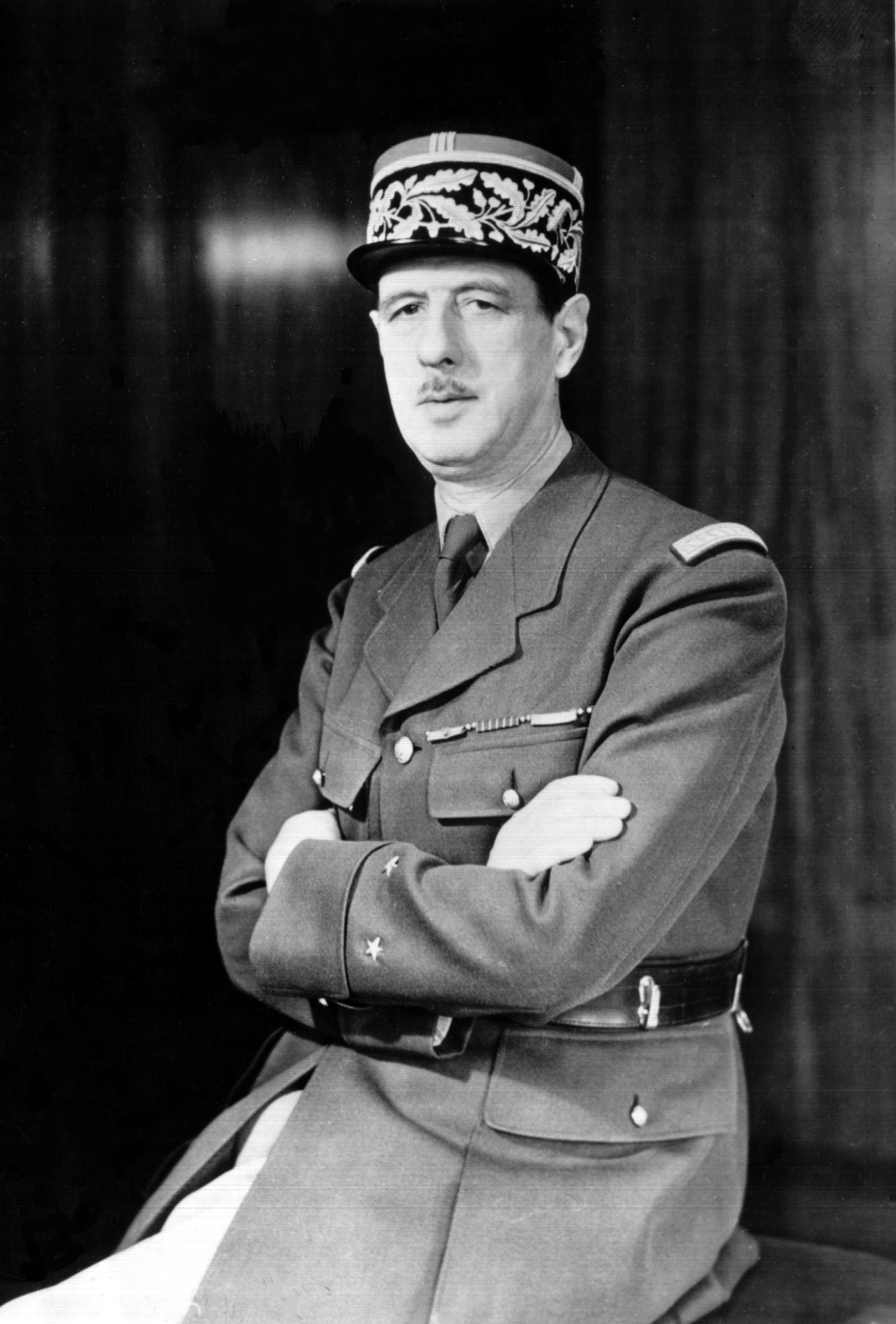
General Charles de Gaulle, Grand Chancellor of the Order of Liberation

The Order of Liberation (French: Ordre de la Libération, pronounced [ɔʁdʁ(ə) də la libeʁɑsjɔ̃]) is a French Order which was awarded to heroes of the Liberation of France during World War II. It is worn by recipients only before the Légion d'Honneur (Legion of Honour). In the official portrait of General de Gaulle as President, he wore the grand collar of the Order and not the grand collar of the Légion d'Honneur, hence signifying the preeminence of the Order ahead of the Légion d'Honneur. Individuals (nationals and foreigners such as the Sultan of Morocco), cities and military units were awarded it upon the sole decision of De Gaulle for feats of heroism in the French Resistance, the Forces Françaises Libres and the Armée d'Afrique; and only for their deeds during World War II. To date it is the only French royal, imperial or republican chivalry order that became extinct with the death of its last member. The youngest Companion, assassinated by the Germans, was only 16 years of age. Another decoration, the Médaille de la Résistance ("Resistance Medal"), was created and awarded for lesser but still distinguished deeds by members of the Resistance.

== History ==
The Order of Liberation was established by General de Gaulle in order n° 7, signed on 16 November 1940 in Brazzaville, the capital of France Libre from 1940 to 1943. The object of the Order was to "reward people, of the military or civilian communities, who will have distinguished themselves in the task of liberating France and her Empire".

There were no restrictions as to age, sex, rank, origin or nationality; nor any regarding the nature of the deeds, other than their exceptional quality.

The Order has a single rank, the title of Compagnon de la Libération ("Companion of the Liberation"). General de Gaulle, founder of the Order, was the only Grand Maître ("Grand Master") of the Order.

The Order was usually bestowed by the traditional French military ceremony of "prise d'armes". The recipient was summoned forward by rank and name, and given the insignia while being commended thus: Nous vous reconnaissons comme notre Compagnon pour la libération de la France dans l'honneur et par la Victoire ("We acknowledge you as our companion for the Liberation of France, in honour and by Victory").

The award officially has precedence just below the Legion of Honour, but the Companions of the Liberation regarded it as a higher honour, and many companions with both took to wearing the ribbon of the order above the red ribbon of the Legion of Honour.

The last awards to French citizens, units and communes were made on 23 January 1946. Awards to foreign nationals were made until 1960.

The last living Companion, Hubert Germain, died in 2021 aged 101. He was buried in the crypt of the Memorial to Fighting France, where a tomb was set aside for the last Companion.

== Award description ==
The medal of the Order is called the Croix de la Libération ("Cross of Liberation"). It is a 31 mm wide by 33 mm high rectangular bronze shield bearing a 60 mm high vertical gladius on its obverse. On the blade of the gladius: a black enamelled Cross of Lorraine (symbol of the Free French Forces). On the reverse, in Latin: a relief inscription in bold letters on four rows, PATRIAM SERVANDO VICTORIAM TULIT ("By serving the Fatherland, he/she achieved Victory").

The award is suspended by a rectangular loop through the hilt of the gladius to a 36 mm wide silk moiré green ribbon with 4 mm wide black edge stripes and 1 mm wide black longitudinal stripes, 11 mm from the edges. Green represents hope, black represents mourning, symbolizing the state of France in 1940. The ribbon at first had diagonal black stripes, but the Order was only awarded in that form during August–September 1942.

== Recipients ==
The individuals, units and communities listed below were awarded the Order of Liberation

A total of 1,061 Crosses of Liberation were awarded:

- 1,038 to individuals;
- 18 to units of the Army, Air Force and Navy;
- Five to cities: Nantes, Grenoble, Paris, Vassieux-en-Vercors, and l'Île de Sein.

=== Individual recipients ===
Amongst the 1,036 Companions of the Order, 65 were killed before the end of the war (8 May 1945) and another 260 received the distinction posthumously. Members of the French resistance, especially the more famous ones, often received the Order under their nom de guerre.

Six women were awarded the title:

- Berty Albrecht, co-founder of the movement Combat, who died in the prison of Fresnes in 1943
- Laure Diebold, liaison agent of the "Mithridate" network and secretary to Jean Moulin, deported.
- Marie Hackin, died at sea in February 1941 on a mission
- Marcelle Henry of the VIC escape network, died shortly after returning from deportation
- Simone Michel-Lévy, of the Postmen Resistance, died while deported
- Émilienne Moreau-Evrard, hero of the First World War, agent for the "Brutus" network and later member of the Provisional Consultative Assembly

Nearly 10% of the recipients of the Order were younger than 20 at the beginning of the war. The youngest, Mathurin Henrio, was 14 when he was shot dead by Nazi officers for refusing to answer questions on the whereabouts of Maquisards.

The Order was re-opened twice to honour foreign personalities who helped liberate France:

- Former Prime Minister Winston Churchill (1958)
- King George VI (1960, posthumously)
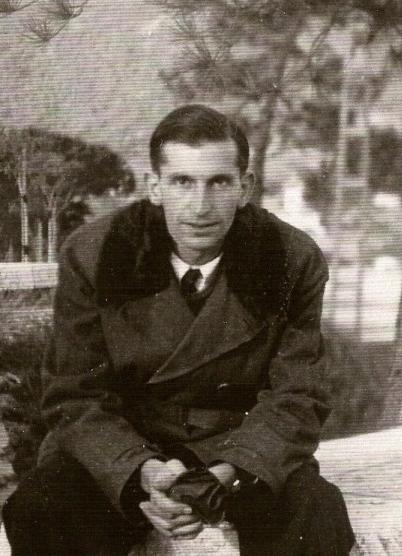
Resistance fighter André Bollier, a posthumous recipient of the Order of Liberation

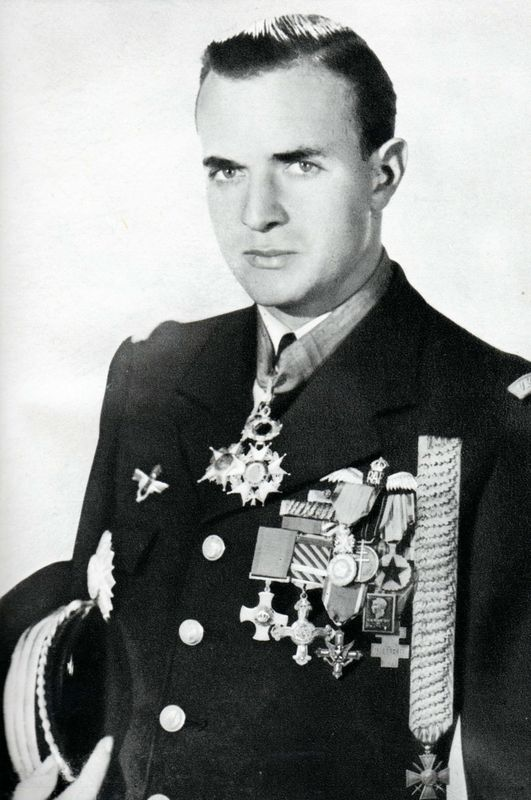
Fighter ace Pierre Clostermann, a recipient of the Order of Liberation

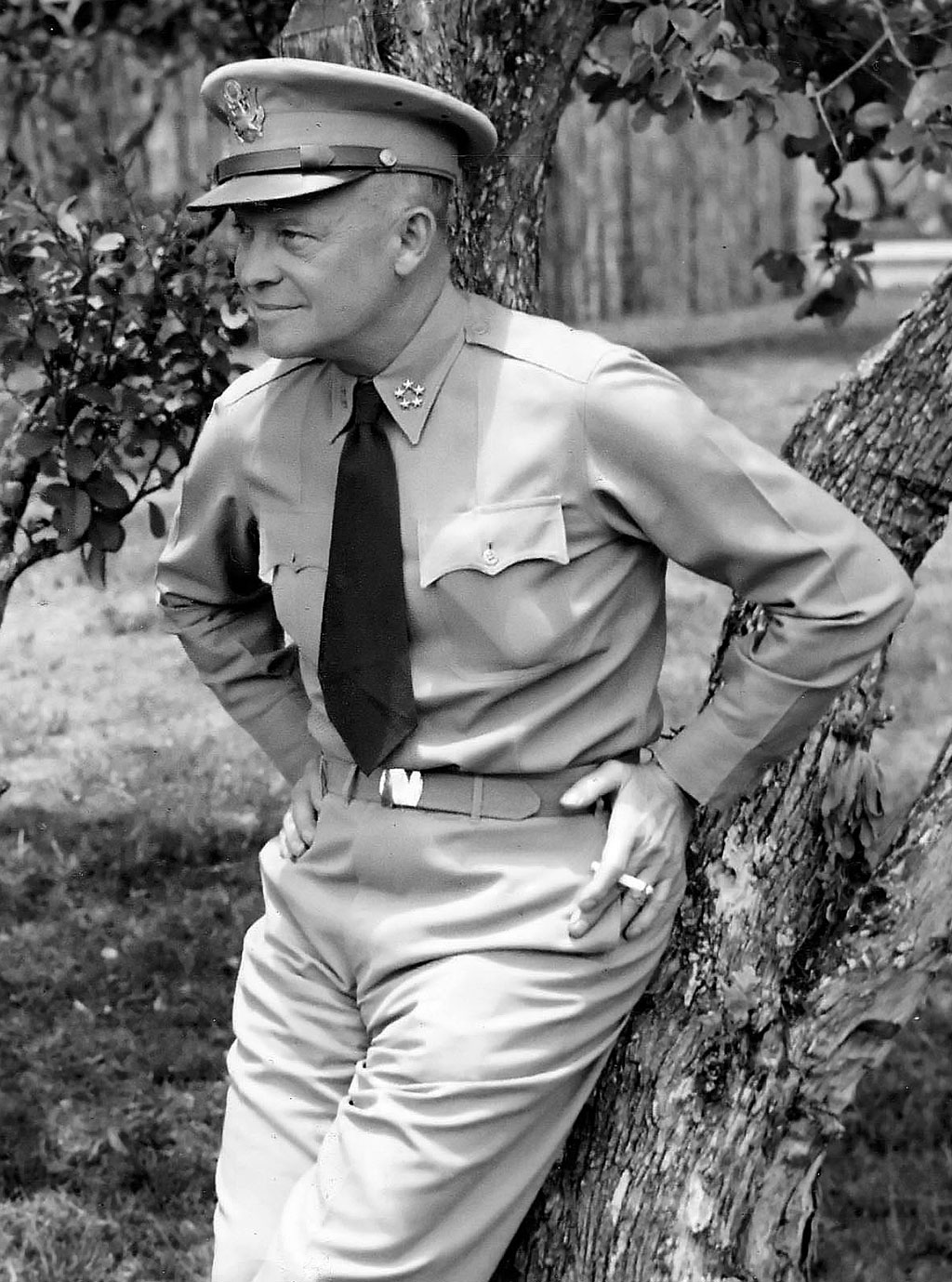
General Dwight D. Eisenhower, a recipient of the Order of Liberation

=== Military units ===
Military units as a whole have been awarded the title of Compagnon de la Libération.

On 18 June 1996, at Mont Valérien, the 18 military units which had been awarded the Cross of Liberation were given a green and black fourragère by President Jacques Chirac.

==== Armée de Terre ====
- Bataillon de Marche n°2
- 13th Foreign Legion Demi-Brigade
- Bataillon d'Infanterie de Marine et du Pacifique
- Régiment de marche du Tchad
- 2nd Colonial Infantry Regiment
- 1st Colonial Artillery Regiment
- 1/3ème Régiment d'Artillerie Coloniale
- 1st Moroccan Spahi Regiment
- 501e Régiment de chars de combat

==== Marine ====
- Sous-marin Rubis
- Corvette Aconit
- 1er Régiment de Fusiliers Marins

==== Armée de l'Air ====
- 1ère Escadrille de Chasse
- Régiment de Chasse Normandie-Niemen
- 2ème Régiment de Chasseurs Parachutistes de l'Armée de l'Air
- Groupe de Bombardement Lorraine
- Groupe de Chasse Ile-de-France
- Groupe de Chasse Alsace

=== Cities ===
- Nantes: awarded on 11 November 1941

Heroic city which, since the crime of capitulation, has opposed a fierce resistance to any sort of collaboration with the enemy. Occupied by German troops and subjected to the harshest of repression, has given to the French, by numerous individual and collective actions, a magnificent example of courage and fidelity. By the blood of her martyred children, showed to the whole World the French will for national liberation.

- Grenoble: awarded on 4 May 1944

Heroic city at the vanguard of the French Resistance and of the fight for liberation. Draped in her pride, despite the arrest and the massacre of her best sons, put up a fierce fight to the Germans at every instant. Despising the interdictions given by the invaders and their accomplices, demonstrated on 11 November 1943 her certainty of Victory and her will to take part in it. On 14 November, and on 2 December 1943, responded to the reprisals and the execution of the chiefs of the Resistance movements by the destruction of the ammunition depot, barracks, power plants and factories used by the enemy. Has served the Motherland well.

- Paris: awarded on 24 March 1945

Capital faithful to herself and to France, demonstrated, under the enemy occupation and oppression, and in spite of the voices of abandonment and treason, her unshakable resolution to fight on and to win. By her courage in the presence of the invader and by the indomitable energy with which she sustained the harshest of trials, deserved to remain as an example for the entire Nation. On 19 August, in cooperation with the Allied and French armies, stood up to drive away the enemy through a series of glorious fights which began in the Cité and swiftly spread to all points of the city. In spite of heavy losses sustained by the French Forces of the Interior fighting within her, liberated itself through her own efforts and, united with the vanguard of the French Army that came to her rescue, has, on 25 August, reduced the German to his last stands and made him capitulate.

- Vassieux-en-Vercors: awarded on 4 August 1945

Village of the Vercors which, thanks to the patriotism of her inhabitants, totally sacrificed herself for the cause of the French Resistance in 1944. Main parachuting centre for the Allied air force on the plateau, always helped by all means possible the military of the Maquis in the gathering of arms. Violently bombed on 14 July, attacked by 24 German gliders on 21 and 22 July, had 72 of her inhabitants massacred and the entirety of her houses burned down by a merciless enemy. Martyr of her faith in the resurrection of the Motherland.

- l'Ile de Sein: awarded on 1 January 1946

Confronted by the enemy invasion, refused to abandon the battlefield which is hers: the Sea. Sent all of her children to fight under the flag of Free France, becoming the example and symbol of all Brittany.

== See also ==
- Musée de l'Ordre de la Libération
- List of companions of the Liberation

== Gallery ==
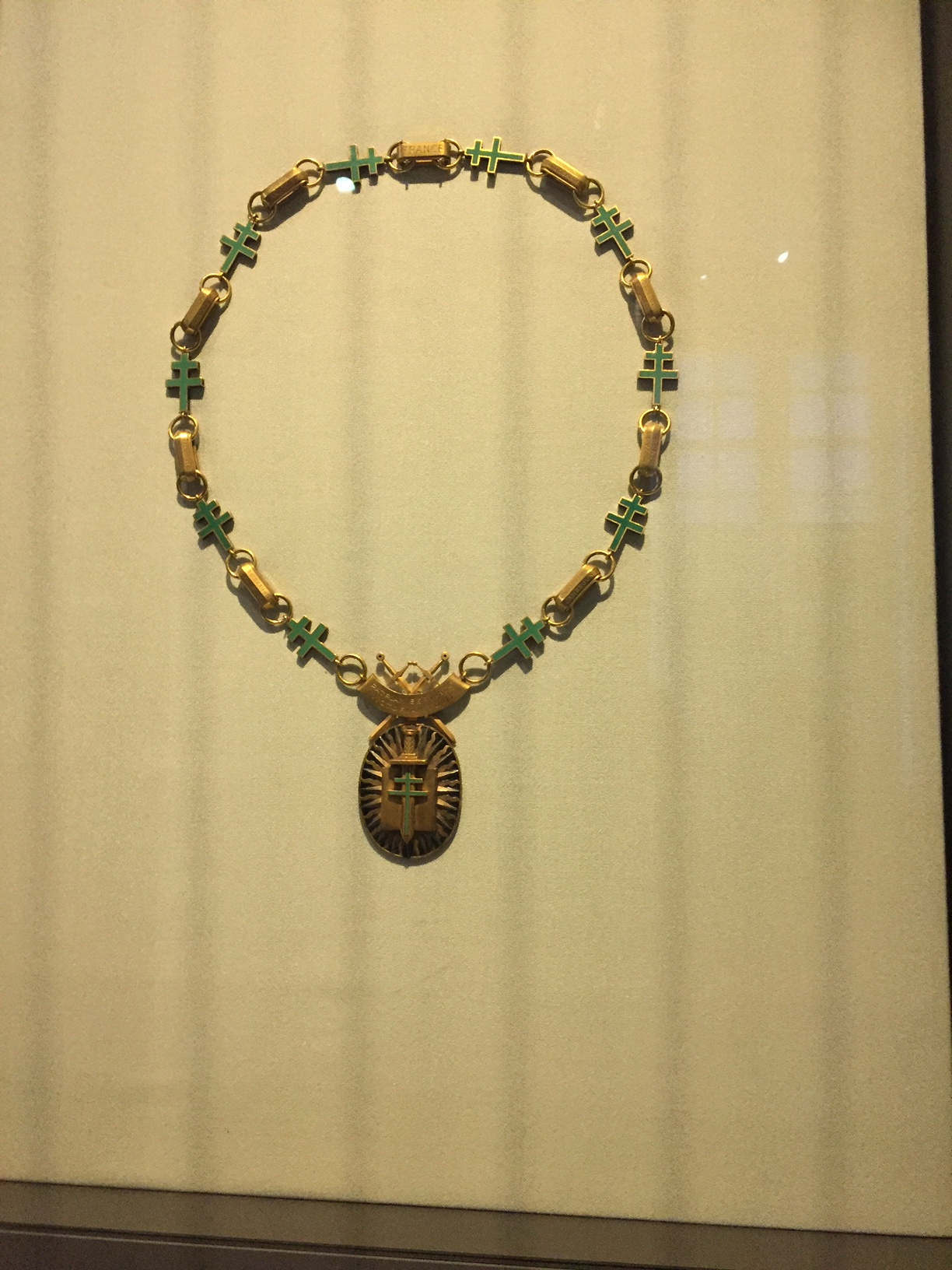
The Grandmaster Collar of the Order of Liberation

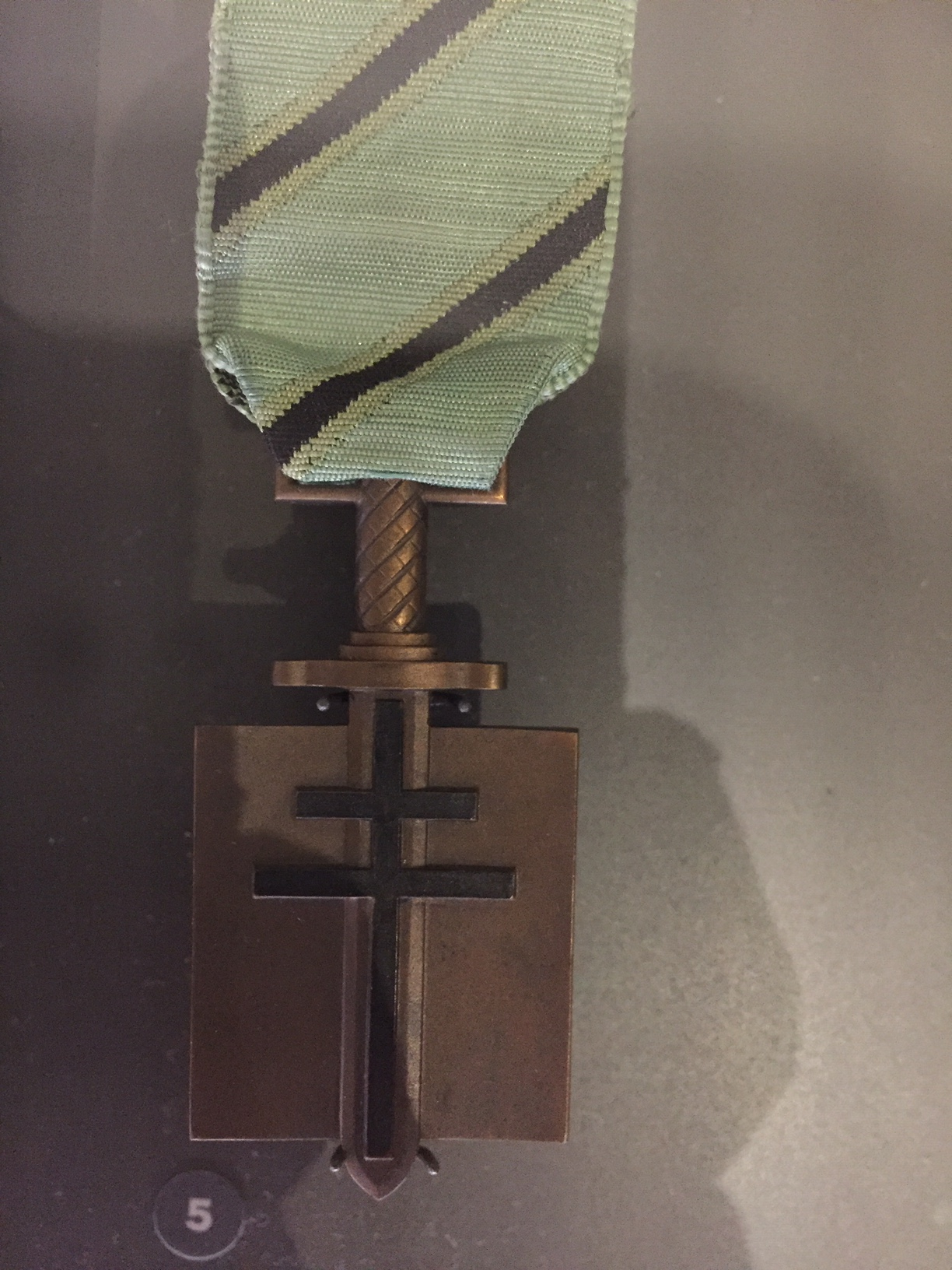
The first model of the Order of Liberation
