= 1er Régiment de Fusiliers Marins =

1^{er} Régiment de Fusiliers Marins
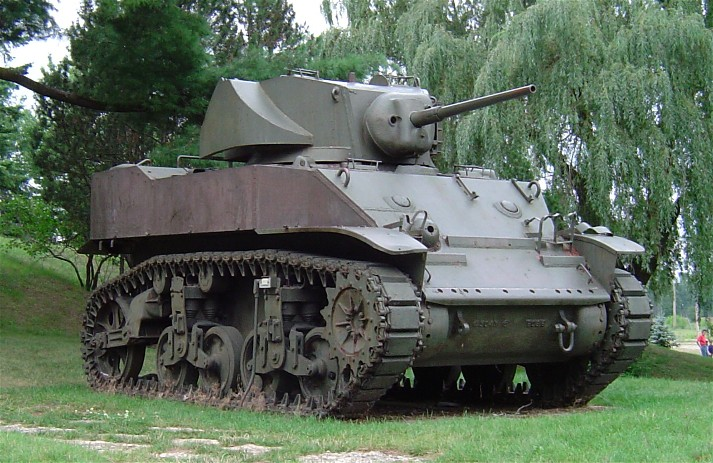
- Active: September 24, 1943 – August 1945
- Country: France
- Branch: French Navy; Fusiliers Marins
- Type: Armoured Regiment
- Part of: 1st French Army or 1st Free French Division 1^{re} DFL
- Equipment: Light Tank
- Engagements: World War II

Commanders
- Ceremonial chief: Naval Corvette captain Pierre de Morsier
- Colonel of the Regiment: Naval Ship-of-the-line captain Hubert Amyot d'Inville †

The 1^{er} Régiment de Fusiliers Marins 1^{er} RFM French ( 1^{er} RFM, or first regiment of Fusiliers Marins) was a unit of the Free French Navy during the campaign of Italy, then in the campaign of France.

== Creation ==
The 1st Battalion was initially formed in summer 1940 in Great Britain, with 400 sailors who had espoused the cause of Charles de Gaulle.

On September 24, 1943, the Fusiliers Marins Battalion increased its effective strength by integrating naval volunteers from North Africa (particularly radio and mechanic specialists), accordingly being designated as the 1st Régiment de fusiliers marins (1^{er} RFM), an armored reconnaissance unit of the 1st Free French Division. Command was entrusted to naval Corvette captain Hubert Amyot d'Inville. The regiment was equipped with U.S. equipment, notably the M24 Chaffee.

== Campaigns ==
=== Italy ===
Following a trained supported phase, the 1^{er} RFM disembarked in Naples as part of the 1st Free French Division, on April 22, 1944. Since May 12, the regiment engaged in intense combats on Garigliano. While bearing the forefront of the division on three axes, the RFM led combats at Montefiascone and Radicofani. The regiment counted 61 killed out of which Amyot d'Inville and 140 wounded.

=== Provence ===
At the end of World War II, the regiment disembarked in Provence, at Cavalaire-sur-Mer, under the command of Corvette captain Pierre de Morsier.

The unit combatted for the liberation of Toulon and Hyères, then reclimbed through the valley of the Rhône, penetrated in Lyon, then reached Autun; the Savary squadron entered following a hard confrontation during which five men were killed and four were wounded. Savary done, in Côte d'Or, the liaison were assumed with units of the 2nd Armored Division (Leclerc) which disembarked in Normandy. The RFM pursues the respective advancement in direction of the Vosgues.

=== Vallée du Rhône ===
The regiment conducted the juncture with the 1st Spahi Regiment (Normandy landings with the 2^{e} DB) at Châtillon-sur-Seine on September 12. This juncture is considered as one of the junctures between Allied troops of Normandy and those of Provence.

=== Haute-Saône ===
On September 27, the tank squadron led the attack on Clairegoutte before apprehending Ronchamp on October 8, then Vescemont, Rougegoutte, Romagny and Rougemont-le-Château the following month. Distinguished particularly in the following operations: Vessel Ensign Bokanowski, Aspirant Vasseur and, alongside the sailors, the men of the 11th Cuir-Vercors (French: 11^{e} Cuir-Vercors) placed under the orders of the 1^{er} RFM.

=== Battle of the Royan pocket ===
Following the campaign in the Vosges, the 1st Free French Division was sent to the Atlantic front to reduce the Royan pocket and Grave cap (French: poche de Royan), however was it recalled urgently on the eastern front due to a German offensive launched in December 1944 in Alsace.

=== Alsace ===
In January 1945, the fusiliers marins distinguished themselves again in Alsace, at Herbsheim and Rossfeld, before pursuing their march towards the Rhin.

=== Alpes ===
Retrieved from the Alsace front, the division was assigned to the detachment of the Army of the Alps in April 1945, in the massif of Authion, where the 1st squadron fought with distinction, enduring the loss in the offensive of five officers out of six and nearly 50% of its forces that were engaged.

== Traditions ==
=== Ordre de la libération ===
The mechanic sailor Georges Brières, killed at Giromagny, rests in the Mémorial de la France combattante. Brières represents the sacrifice of all sailors lost for the Liberation of France.

=== Regimental Colors ===
The regimental colors, memory and tradition of the 1^{er} Régiment de fusiliers marins are confined to the fusiliers school. With the Naval leadership of the Régiment Blindé de Fusiliers-Marins RBFM of the French Navy which was not part of the Free French Forces FFL, nor part of the Free French Naval Forces FNFL, the Naval leadership of the 1^{er} Régiment de Fusiliers Marins showcased the valor of French arms.

=== Regiment combat casualties ===
Between October 1940 and May 1945, the ensemble of the 1^{er} BFM/ 1^{e} RFM endured the loss of 195 men amongst them 12 officers out of which 2 commandants.

=== Decorations ===
Awarded to the men of this regiment:

- 200 croix de guerre,
- 70 médailles militaires,
- 32 Légion d'honneur,
- 31 croix de la Libération.

The regimental colors of the 1^{er} RFM was awarded 5 citations at the orders of the armed forces obtained for 1939-1945 with attribution of the croix de la Libération, the médaille de la Résistance française and la croix de guerre.

In August 1945, the 1^{er} RFM was reassigned at the disposition of Naval authorities.

== See also ==
- Brigade de Fusiliers Marins
- List of Allied forces in the Normandy Campaign
