= Dixmude (disambiguation) =

Dixmude or Diksmuide, Belgian city.

Dixmude may also refer to:

- Alphonse Jacques de Dixmude
- French ship Dixmude, three units of the French Navy have been named after the Battle of the Yser
- Dixmude (airship) in French service, previously known as Zeppelin LZ 114
