= Fusiliers marins =

Protection forces of the French Navy

Sailor Riflemen
- Fusiliers marins
- Insignia of Fusiliers marins
- Active: 1856 – present
- Country: France
- Branch: French Navy
- Type: Naval Security Forces
- Role: Force protection Maritime interdiction Master-at-arms; Naval boarding
- Size: ~ 1,800
- Garrison/HQ: BFM "Amyot d'Inville" – Brest; BFM "De Morsier" – Île Longue; BFM "Détroyat" – Toulon; CFM "Le Goffic" – Cherbourg; CFM "Bernier" – Lanvéoc; CFM "Brière" – Lann-Bihoué; CFM "Colmay" – France Sud; CFM "Morel" – Sainte-Assise; CFM "Le Sant" – Rosnay
- Motto: On ne se rendra jamais ("We shall never surrender")
- Mascot: Neptune (mythology)
- Engagements: Franco-Prussian War; World War I World War II; First Indochina War; Algerian War

Commanders
- Current commander: Counter admiral Alain Thomas
- Notable commanders: CDR. Philippe Kieffer; Admiral Pierre Alexis Ronarc'h

The Fusiliers marins (lit. "Sailor Riflemen") are specialized sailors of the Marine nationale (French Navy). The Fusiliers marins serve primarily as the Navy’s security forces, providing protection for naval vessels and naval installations on land. Created in 1856 and with a modern strength of about 1,800 personnel, the Fusiliers marins should not be confused with the larger Troupes de Marine of the Armée de terre (French Army) who are often referred to as the French "marines."

== Missions ==
The Fusiliers marins are tasked with:

- the protection of sensitive sites of the Navy (Naval bases, French Naval Aviation, transmission stations etc.);
- reinforcement of protection duties provided by Naval forces (maintaining order on board ship and the protection of naval vessels against attack).

== History of the French Fusiliers marins ==
=== Creation of a specialized corps in 1856 ===
These companies lacked specialized personnel trained for combat on land.

An Imperial decree dated 5 June 1856, created the Fusiliers marins, whose formation and training were undertaken by a battalion stationed at Lorient, Brittany. This specialized corps was put under the command of the captains and sergeants-at-arms of the various naval vessels of the French fleet, and was the direct ancestor of the modern Fusiliers.

Since that date, the Fusiliers have participated the following conflicts:

- The military colonial campaigns of the end of the 19th century,
- The expeditions in China, Cochinchina, Tonkin and Madagascar,
- The European conflicts in 1870, 1914–1918 and 1939–1945.

During the Franco-Prussian War of 1870, following the disaster of Sedan, several brigades of Fusiliers marins and naval artillerymen were engaged in combat at Bapaume and subsequently participated in the defense of Paris, notably at the Bourget and at L'Haÿ-les-Roses. This force formed part of the Government Armée versaillaise (French: armée versaillaise) employed in the suppression of the Paris Commune in 1871.

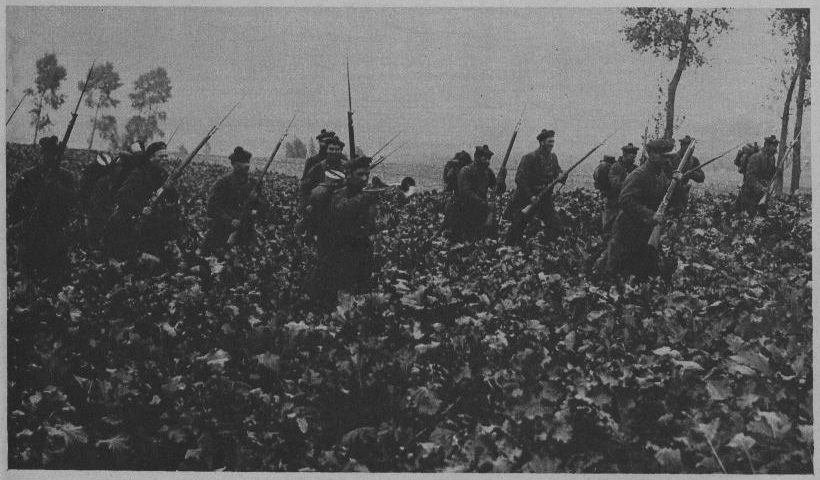
The first engagement of the Fusiliers marins in the Nord department, in November 1914

A detachment of Fusiliers marins defended the French Legation (diplomatic mission) in Peking during the Boxer Rebellion of 1900. Amongst their officers was enseigne de vaisseau Paul Henry and Pierre Alexis Ronarc'h, who, in 1914, would serve as Counter-Admiral and Commandant of the Brigade de Fusiliers Marins BFM attached to the 32nd Army Corps.

The Brigade de Fusiliers marins distinguished themselves at Dixmude, on the Yser, at Longewaede, Hailles and Laffaux during the early stages of World War I. Three French ships have been named after Dixmude.

The Fusiliers marins participated in the campaigns of Free France. They initially formed a battalion then the 1^{er} Régiment de Fusiliers Marins 1^{e} RFM at the corps of the 1st Free French Division (1^{er} DFL) and the 1^{er} Bataillon de Fusiliers Marins Commandos (1^{er} BFMC) who served in 10 (Inter-Allied) Commando. The 177 Commandos Kieffer who disembarked on 6 June in Normandy, were Fusiliers Marins forming part of the Free France Forces. Other Fusiliers Marins, drawn from the former Armée de Vichy, formed the Régiment Blindé de Fusiliers-Marins (RBFM) which served efficiently as part of the 2nd Armored Division. On 30 April 1945 the Fusiliers marins played a role in the liberation of the Île d'Oléron. Disembarked at 0620 at Gatseau, an FM detachment advanced slowly through forested terrain facing stern resistance.

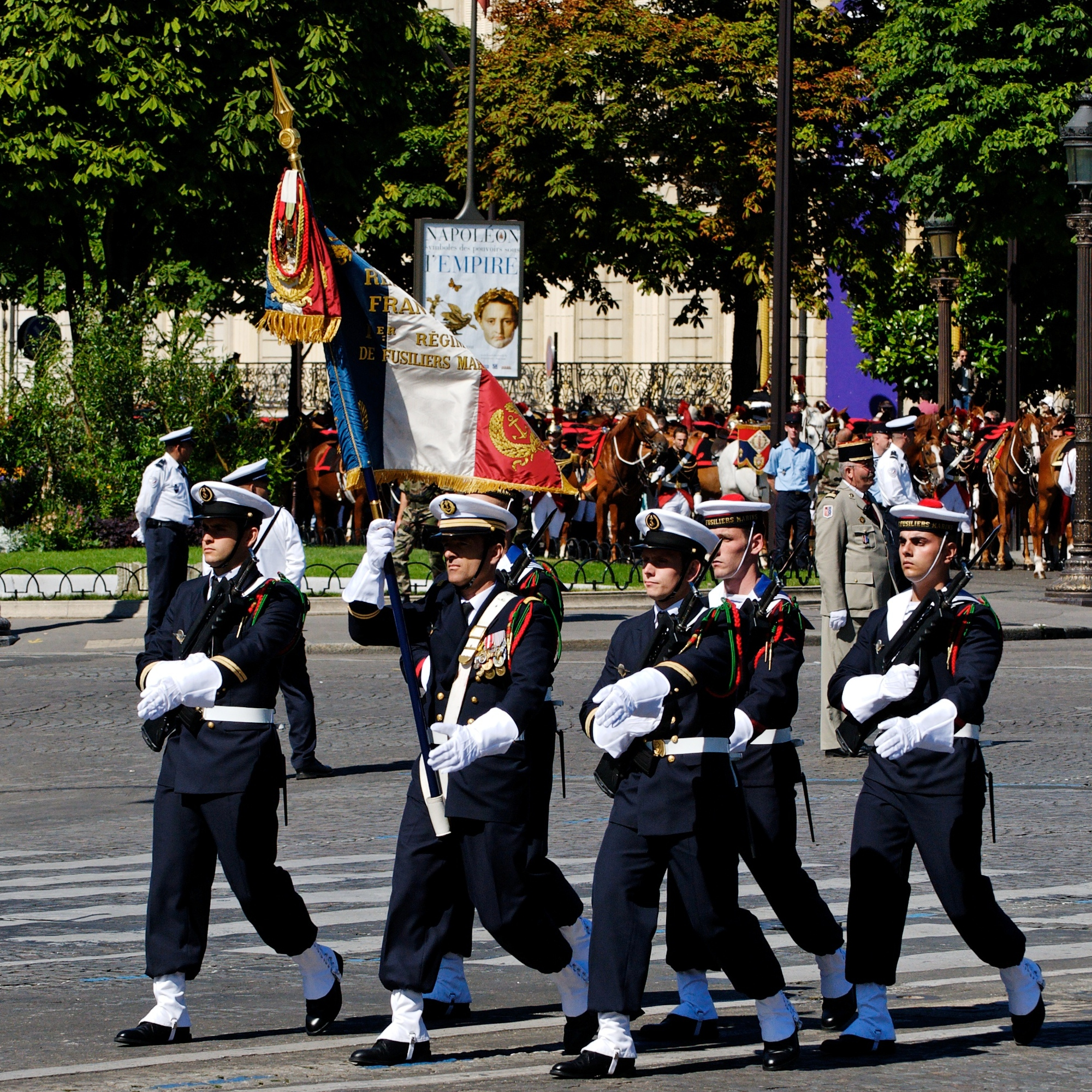
The regimental colors of the 1st Regiment of Fusiliers Marins at the 2008 Bastille Day Military Parade

In 1945, the Far Eastern Marine Brigade (BMEO) was created with personnel from the RBFM and the 1^{er} RFM, and was part of the French Far East Expeditionary Corps. The Marine Brigade formed riverine brigades (flottilles fluviales) in 1945–1946. They became the Dinassaut, which were created by General Leclerc in 1947 in order to replace the flottilles fluviales created by Jaubert, and operated in Tonkin and Cochinchina from 1947 to 1954. In 1956, with operational cadres serving in Algeria, the Demi-Brigade of Fusiliers Marins (DBFM) was created to play a leading role in securing the borders between Algeria and Morocco until 1962. This demi-brigade was under the command of Vessel Commander (CV) Ponchardier.

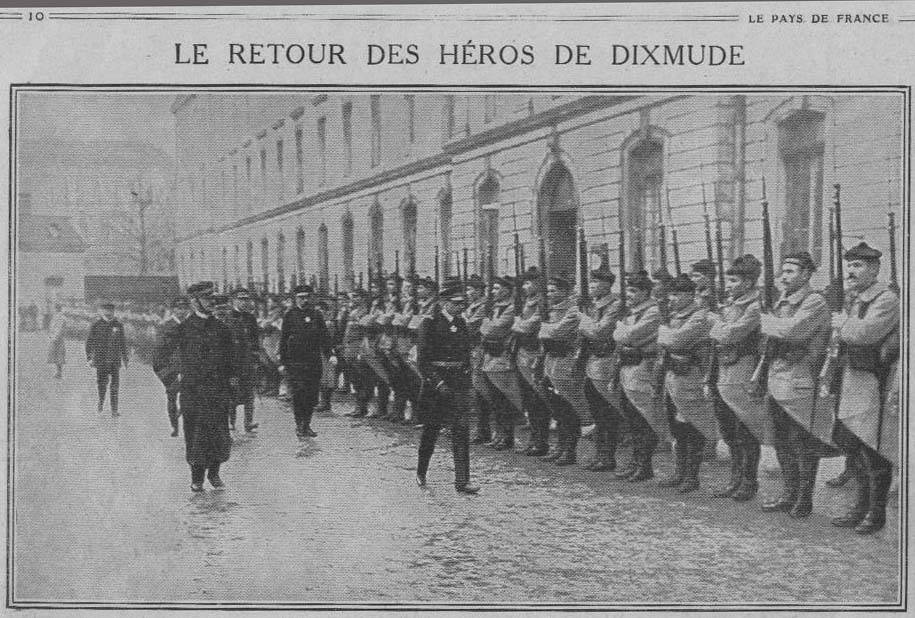
Fusiliers marins decorated after the Battle of the Yser

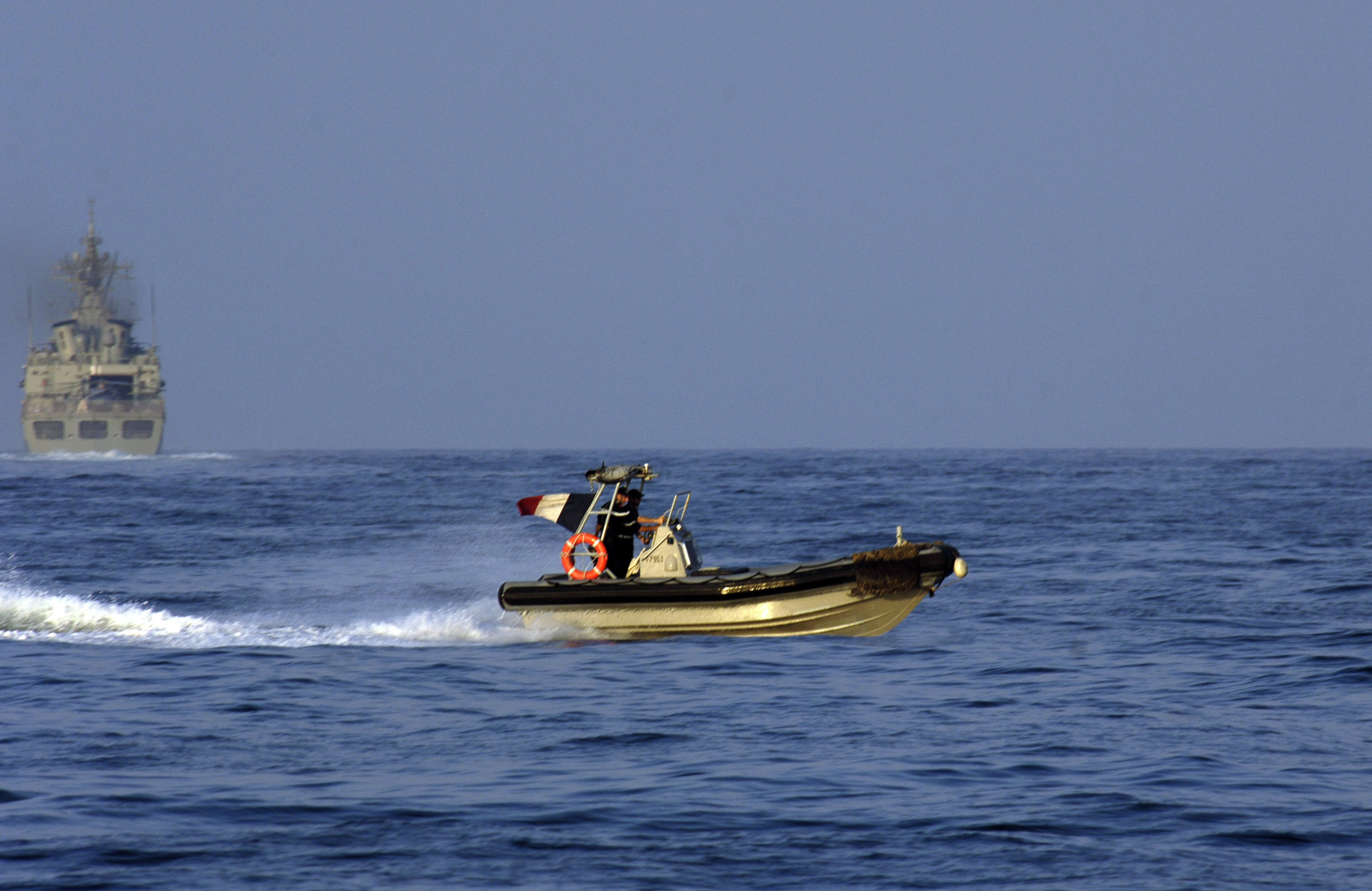
Inspections at sea are often carried out by Fusilliers marins.

== Uniforms ==
During the 19th and early 20th centuries the Fusiliers marins wore the standard dark blue or white uniforms of the French navy. When serving on land during the Franco-Prussian War and World War I the capotes (greatcoats) of the regular French infantry were adopted, together with leggings and leather campaign equipment. The Fusiliers marins retained their naval caps as distinctions, although the conspicuous red pompon was not worn in the field in 1914.

The modern Sailor Riflemen wear a dark blue beret with their combat uniforms, pulled right with their own distinctive badge worn over the left eye or temple. Along with the Naval Commandos, they are unique among French forces in wearing the beret this way. When wearing regular dress uniforms, the sailor cap is worn by junior ratings and the peaked cap by senior petty officers and officers.

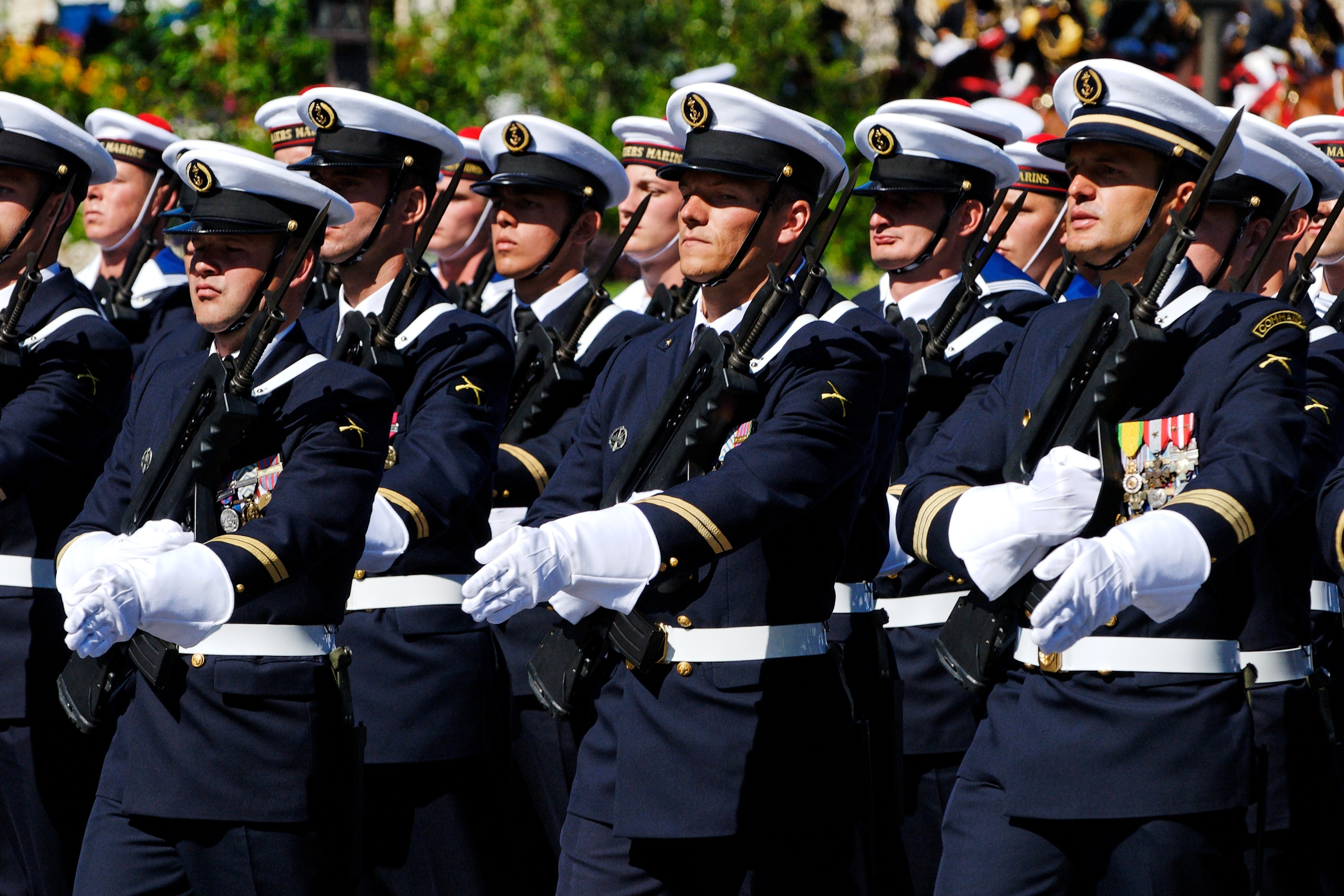
Parade uniform

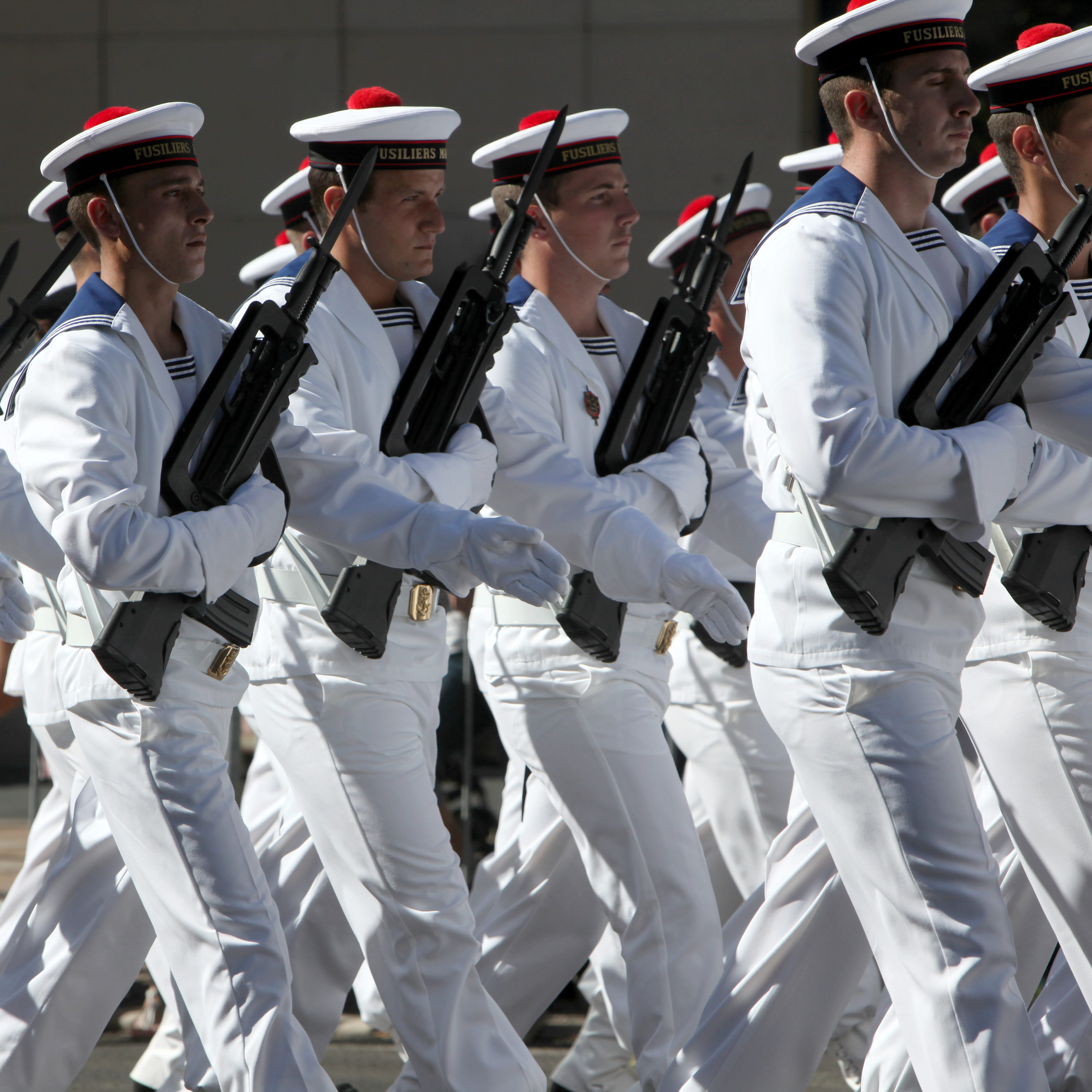
Summer parade uniform

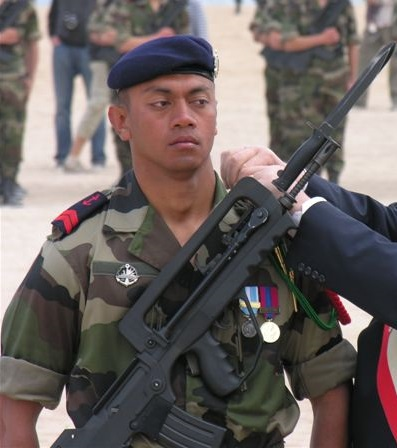
Standard combat clothing

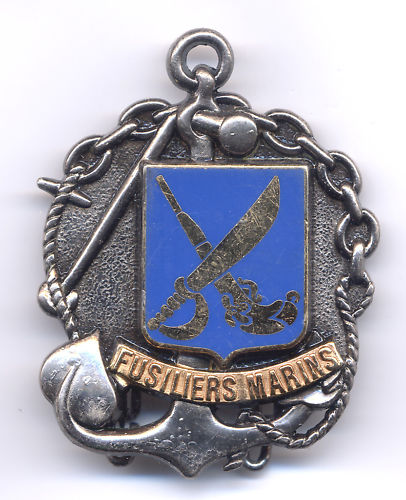
The Fusiliers marins' beret badge

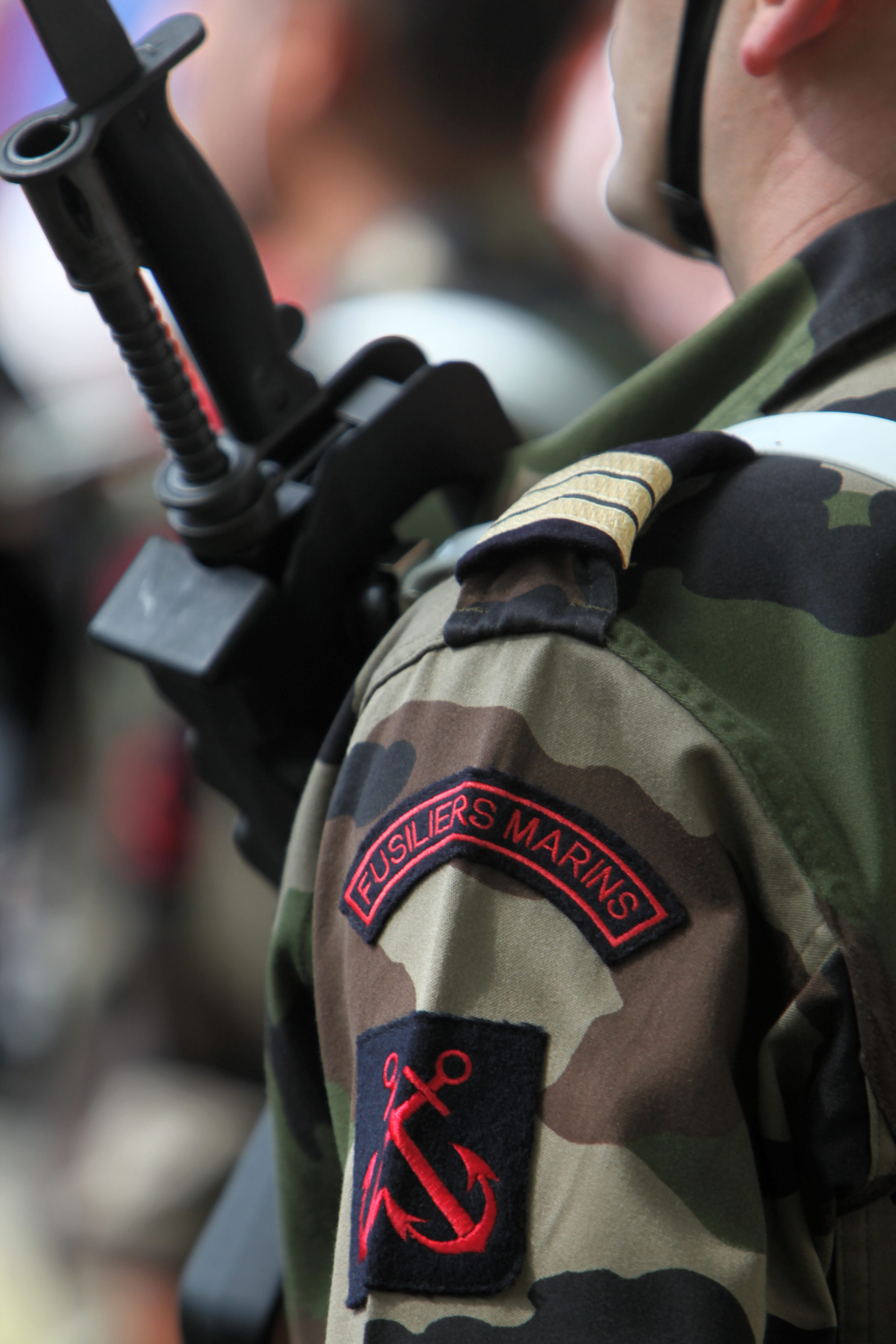
Fusiliers marins combat uniform insigna

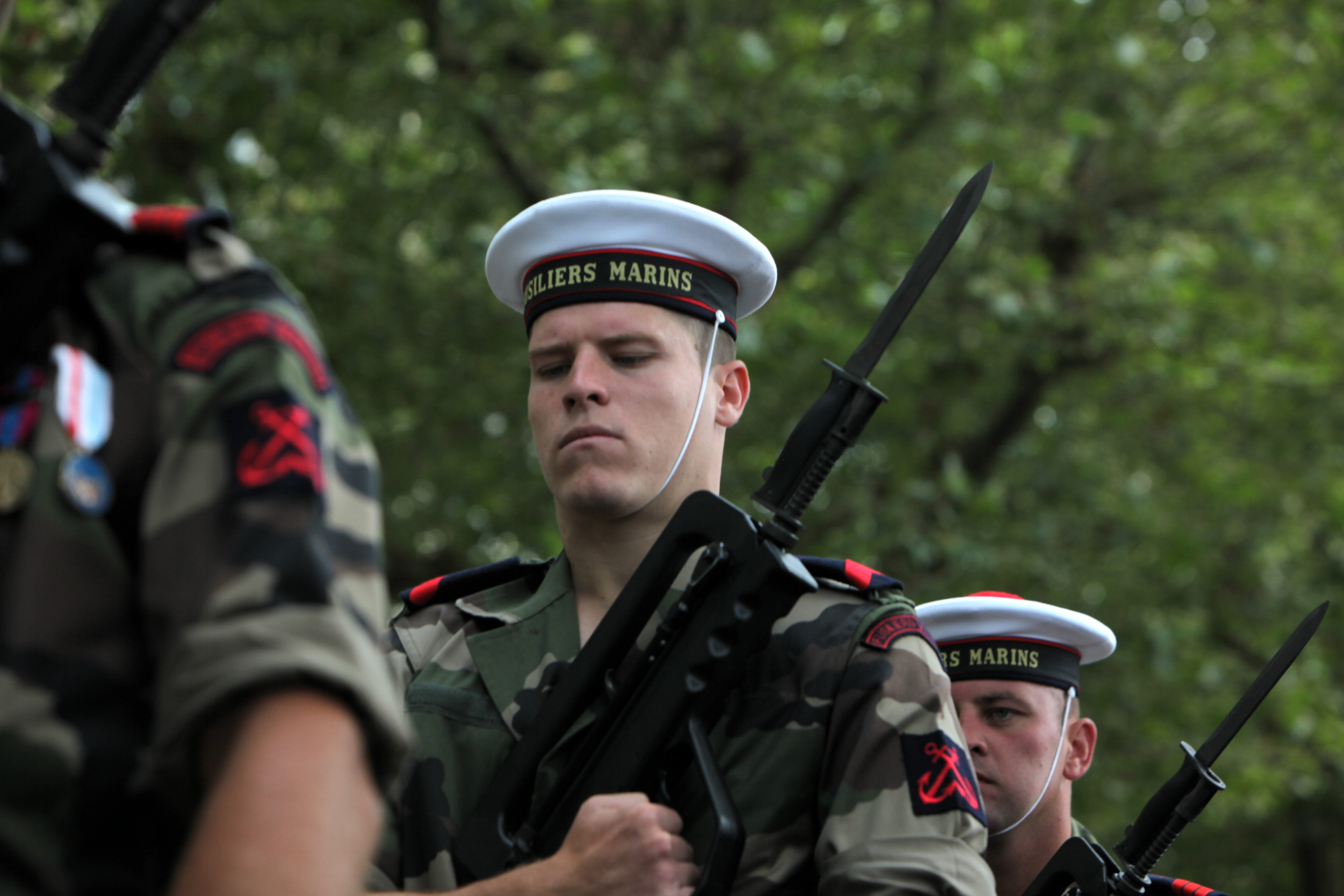
Fusiliers marins parading with the sailor hat worn with camouflage uniform

== Equipment ==
=== Weapons used ===
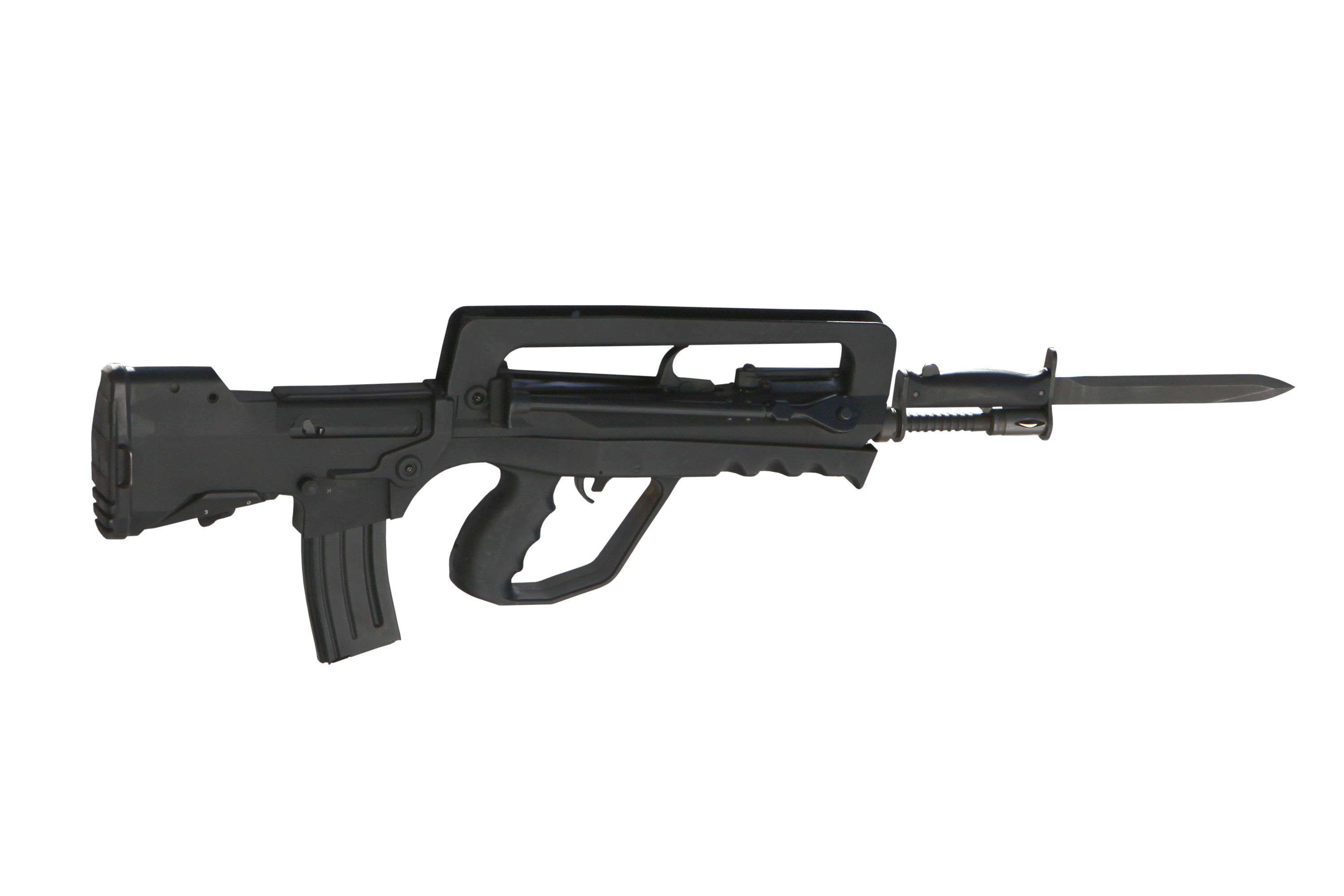
FAMAS-G2 with bayonet as issued by French Navy

Assault rifles

- Famas G2 assault rifle
- HK416 assault rifle

Sniper rifles

- HK G3-SG1
- FR F2 sniper rifle

Shotguns

- Valtro PM5 M2 shotgun

Pistols

- HK Marine semi-automatic pistol

Non-lethal

- Alsetex "Cougar" 56mm grenade launcher (used for riot control and other such purposes)
- X26 Taser weapon

Machine guns

- Browning machine gun Cal.50 M-2HB
- NF-1 machine gun

Rocket launchers

- AT4CS Anti-tank weapon

=== Inflatable boats ===
- Zodiac Hurricane 630 IO EDOP
- Zodiac Futura Mark II
- Zodiac Futura Mark III

=== Ground vehicles ===
- Light tactical vehicle Land Rover Defender 90 Td5
- ACMAT VT 4

== Notable Fusiliers marins ==
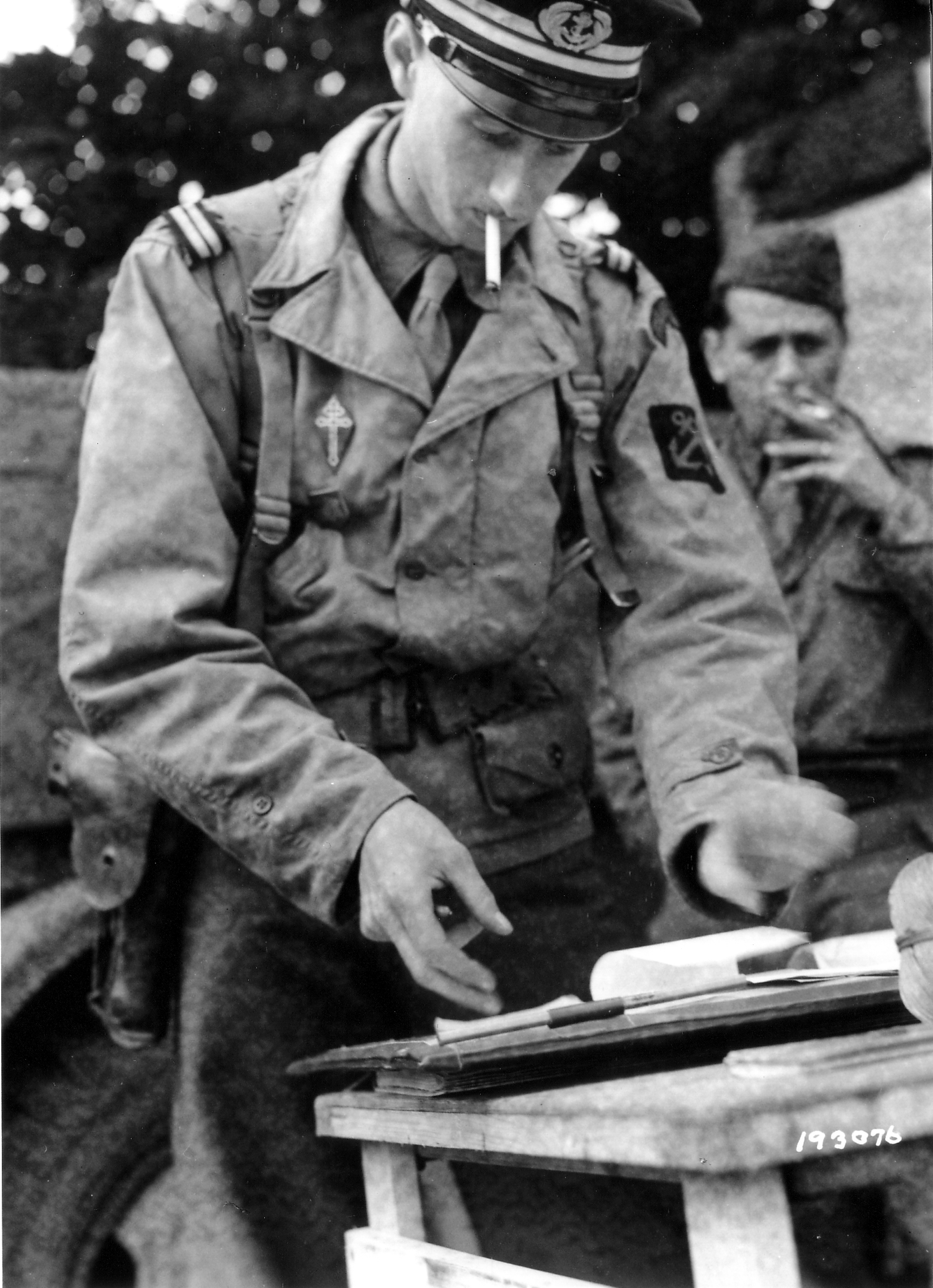
Philippe de Gaulle as Fusilier marin officer during World War II

- Admiral Philippe de Gaulle, son of General Charles de Gaulle
- Lieutenant Commander Henri de Pimodan, famous resistant, died in deportation
- Lieutenant Commander Robert Detroyat, first commandant of the legendary 1st battalion of Fusilier marins, died during operation Exporter in Syria (1941)
- Quarter-master Theo "Dudu" Dumas, a popular figure who appears in the film Taxi for Tobruk played by Lino Ventura
- Quarter-master Constant Duclos, the first French soldier to execute a parachute jump on 17 November 1915
- Lieutenant Georges Hébert, a pioneering French physical educator, theorist, and instructor
- Sub-Lieutenant Paul Henry, Fusilier marin officer, died defending the legation quarter of Peking (1900)
- Lieutenant Pierre Guillaume, a famous Fusilier officer of the French Indochina War, inspired the character of "Drummer Crab", the hero of the French film Le Crabe-tambour.
- Actor Jean Gabin made his military service in the Fusiliers marins in 1924.
- Mercenary Bob Denard served as a fusilier marin during the First Indochina War
- Actor Alain Delon served as a fusilier marin during the First Indochina War.

== See also ==
- FORFUSCO
- Commandos Marine
- List of active French Navy ships
- List of ships of the line of France
- List of submarines of France
- List of escorteurs of the French Navy
- Sailors of the Imperial Guard
