= Régiment Blindé de Fusiliers-Marins =

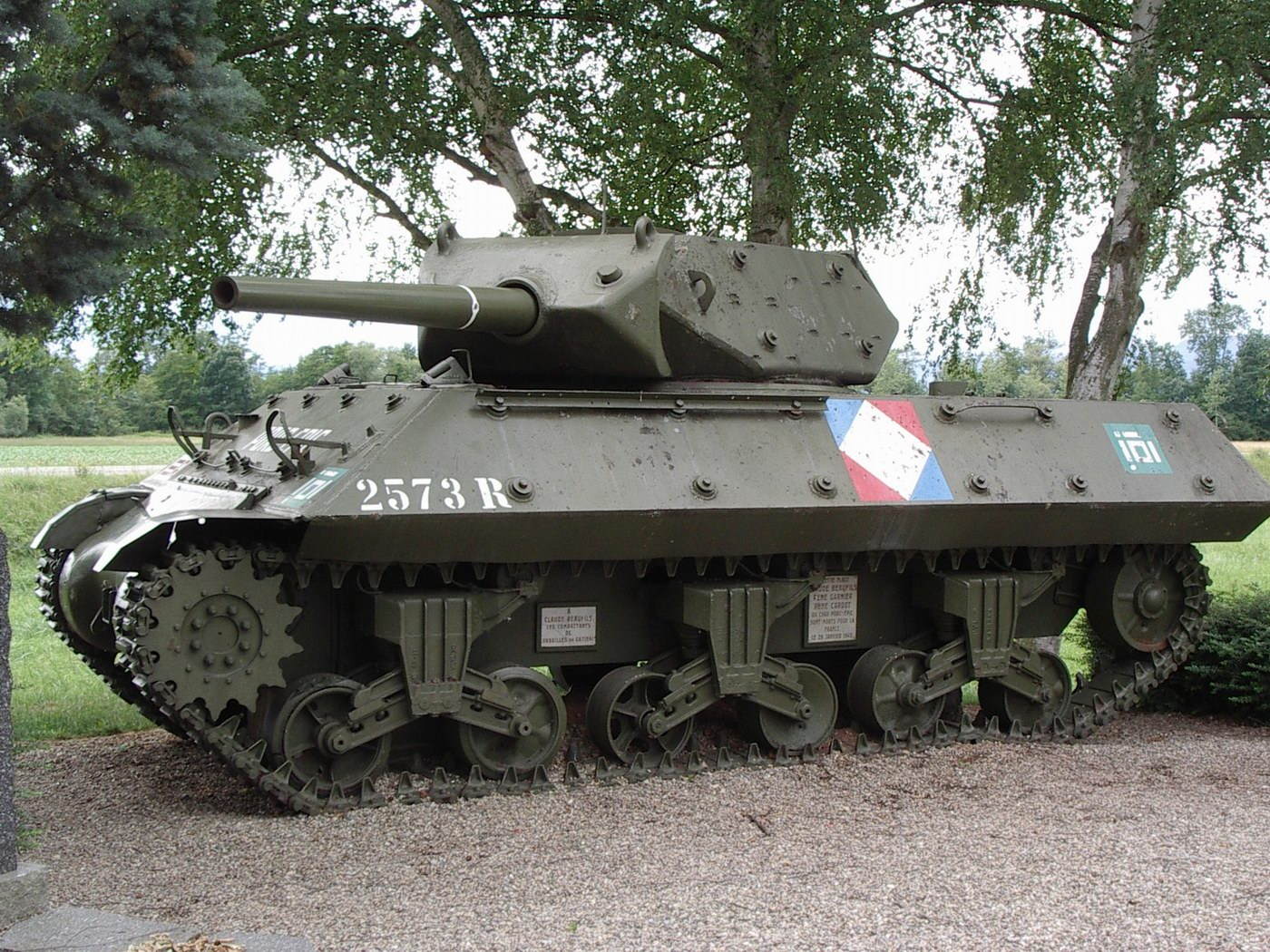
- M10 tank destroyer similar to those of the RBFM.
- Active: September 19, 1943 – end of 1945
- Country: Free France
- Branch: French Navy; Fusiliers Marins
- Type: Tank destroyer regiment
- Size: 4 squadrons
- Part of: French 2nd Armored Division
- Engagements: World War II
- Decorations: Fourragere Légion d'honneur (Dixmude, 1944)

Commanders
- Colonel of the Regiment: Naval Ship-of-the-line captain Maggiar

Régiment Blindé de Fusiliers-Marins (RBFM) was an armored naval infantry regiment of the French 2nd Armored Division. The regiment belonged to the units of the French Fusiliers Marins, which are units of the French Navy whose ships were either immobilized or destroyed.

== History ==
In November 1942, Anglo-American troops invaded North Africa and were joined by a group of Fusiliers-Marins (45 Fusiliers-Marins and 333 Officiers Mariniers, Able Seamen and Sailors) who volunteered to serve alongside Allied forces. These volunteers were armed with U.S. equipment and served as reconnaissance troops, becoming known as the Bizerte Battalion.

== Organisation ==
On 19 September 1943, the Bizerte Battalion was redesignated the Régiment Blindé de Fusiliers-Marins. They were then moved to Casablanca, Morocco where they were joined by other volunteers who replaced those Marines who had returned to naval service.

At Berkane, Morocco, they underwent training on the M10 tank destroyer, alongside the 11th African Chasseur Regiment.

Under the command of Naval Ship-of-the-line captain Maggiar, assisted by capitaine de corvette Martinet, the RBFM was equipped with 36 M10s, 25 M3 Scout Cars, 6 M2 half-tracks, 3 M3 Half-tracks and other vehicles and were integrated into the French 2nd Armored Division.

The RBFM was organised into 5 squadrons:

- Headquarters staff squadron
- 1st Squadron commanded by a Naval Lieutenant de Vaisseau (LV)
- 2nd Squadron commanded by a Naval Lieutenant de Vaisseau
- 3rd Squadron commanded by a Naval Lieutenant de Vaisseau
- 4th Squadron commanded by a Naval Lieutenant de Vaisseau

In addition a female ambulance platoon, the Marinettes, part of the 13th Medical Battalion, commanded by a female Enseigne de vaisseau was attached to the Regiment.

== Campaigns ==
=== Arrival in Normandy ===
The 2nd Armored Division began disembarking on French soil at 01:30 on 3 August 1944, at Saint Martin de Varreville, the coast of Utah Beach.

On 6 August the 2nd Armored Division began its advance in the direction of Coutances, La Haye-Fresnel, Avranches, Ducey and Saint-Laurent-de-Terregate.

=== Liberation of Paris ===
The RBFM played an active role in the liberation of Paris by penetrating the city in three places as follows:

- the 4th Squadron attacked towards the Pont de Sèvres, which was reached on the night of 24 July, despite strong resistance
- the 3rd squadron proceeded through Arpajon, Longjumeau, Antony, Sceaux, to arrive by the Porte d'Orléans, Porte de Gentilly and Porte d'Italie while progressing in the direction of Hötel de Ville to finish at the Hotel Meurice
- 1st and 2nd Squadrons along with the Regimental command post proceeded through Trappes and Voisins-le-Bretonneux where one of the M10 tank destroyers fired on the bell tower of the church, which was being used as a German observation post.

Later the 1st and 2nd squadrons were positioned at the Hippodrome de Longchamp, the 3rd squadron at Le Bourget, while the 4th squadron was positioned at the Fort de Briche, at Saint Denis.

Since Normandy, the regiment destroyed some 60 German tanks for the loss of 10 M10 tank destroyers.

=== Dompaire ===
The 2nd Armor Division advanced into Lorraine and at Dompaire, the regiment's M10 tank destroyers accompanied by U.S. Thunderbolts destroyed an entire panzer brigade.

=== Liberation of Strasbourg ===
Units of the RBFM regrouped for an assault on Strasbourg. The regiment attacked at Baccarat and Phalsbourg, ending their assault at Pont de Kehl.

== Notable members ==
- Philippe de Gaulle
- Jean-Alexis Moncorgé

== Distinctions ==
The RBFM was not a unit of the Free French Forces nor was it part of the Free French Naval Forces, accordingly, their members couldn't wear the insignia of the Free French.

The Régiment Blindé de Fusiliers-Marins was decorated with the fourragère de la Légion d'Honneur des Fusiliers Marins de Dixmude, awarded in May 1944.

== Reconstitution ==
In 1945, the Far Eastern Marine Brigade (BMEO) was created with personnel from the RBFM and the 1^{er} RFM, and was part of the French Far East Expeditionary Corps. The Marine Brigade formed riverine brigades (flottilles fluviales) in 1945–1946. They became the Dinassaut, which were created by General Leclerc in 1947 in order to replace the flottilles fluviales created by Jaubert, and operated in Tonkin and Cochinchina from 1947 to 1954. In 1956, with operational cadres serving in Algeria, the Demi-Brigade of Fusiliers Marins (DBFM) was created to play a leading role in securing the borders between Algeria and Morocco until 1962. This demi-brigade was under the command of Vessel Commander (CV) Ponchardier.

== See also ==
- Brigade de Fusiliers Marins
- List of Allied forces in the Normandy Campaign
- 1er Régiment de Fusiliers Marins
