= Dixmude (airship) =

French Navy Zeppelin LZ 114 airship destroyed in 1923

Coordinates: 37.5°N 14°E

Dixmude (ex-LZ 114)
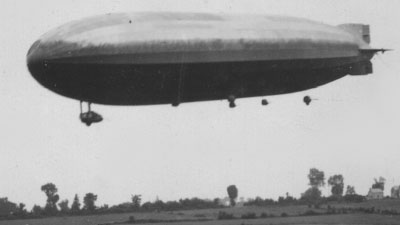
- Zeppelin LZ-114

General information
- Role: reconnaissance/bomber
- National origin: Germany
- Manufacturer: Zeppelin Luftschiffbau
- Designer: Ludwig Dürr: Chief designer and engineer, instrumental in the technical design of many Zeppelin airships, including military models like the LZ 114 Ludwig Dürr (Designer)
- Service: French Navy

History
- First flight: 9 July 1920
- Last flight: 21 December 1923
- Fate: Destroyed after crash and explosion

Dixmude was a Zeppelin airship built for the Imperial German Navy as L 72 (c/n LZ 114) and unfinished at the end of the First World War, when it was given to France as war reparations and recommissioned for service in the French Navy and renamed Dixmude. The airship was lost when it exploded in mid-air on 21 December 1923 off the coast of Sicily, killing all 50 (40 crew and ten passengers) on board. This was one of the earliest of the great airship disasters, preceded by the crash of the British R38 in 1921 (44 dead) and the US airship Roma in 1922 (34 dead), and followed by the destruction of the USS Shenandoah in 1925 (14 dead) the British R101 in 1930 (48 dead), the USS Akron in 1933 (73 dead) and the German Hindenburg in 1937 (36 dead).

== Name ==
The ship was named after the Belgian city of Diksmuide (French: Dixmude), and specifically, in honour of the Fusiliers Marins at the battle of Diksmuide. It was the first of three ships named Dixmude.

== History ==
Completed after the end of the First World War, L 72 was the third and final Zeppelin of the X class built for the Imperial German Navy. L 72 was originally built with the intention to bomb New York City, a mission never carried out due to the end of the war. The Zeppelin Company still wanted to fly L 72 to New York as a demonstration of the Zeppelin's capabilities, but the flight was never undertaken for political reasons. Instead, the British airship R34 became the first aircraft to make the first east–west-east transatlantic flight in July 1919. L 72 made its first flight on 9 July 1920 and was surrendered to the French authorities four days later, when the airship was flown by a German civilian crew from Friedrichshafen to Maubeuge and was rechristened Dixmude in honour of the French marines who had died in the defence of Diksmuide in 1914. Under the command of lieutenant Jean du Plessis de Grenédan it was then flown across France to the naval air base at Cuers-Pierrefeu near Toulon.

Dixmude was deflated and remained in its hangar for the next three years. In 1921, while attempting to reinflate the airship, it was discovered that the original gasbags had deteriorated. Although new gasbags could have been purchased from the Zeppelin company, the French preferred to have their own made in France, resulting in a two-year delay while the technique of using gold beater's skin was mastered. The bags were delivered in June 1923 and proved to be less than satisfactory; many small tears appeared, possibly due to the use of an inferior quality of cotton. An ambitious flight across the Sahara to Dakar was approved, and in preparation for this, a programme of trials was begun.

On 2 August 1923, Dixmude made an 18-hour trip to Corsica. Between 30 August and 2 September, it made a 2,800 km (1,700 mi) trip to North Africa, passing over Algiers, Tunis and Bizerte, and returning via Sardinia and Corsica.

On 25 September 1923 at 07:55, Dixmude left Cuers, crossing the Mediterranean to Algiers and then turned westwards, following the coast to Bizerte and then turning south, flying over Sousse and Sfax where it turned inland towards Touggourt. The return flight over the Mediterranean was delayed by a storm which initially caused du Plessis to turn back to Bizerte, but after the weather cleared a successful crossing was made. On reaching Cuers, conditions were so favourable that the dirigible continued to Bordeaux and then to Paris, arriving during the morning of 28 September. Dixmude then returned to Cuers, which was reached at 8 pm, but, still having fuel on board, then flew to Nice and back, finally mooring at Cuers at 06:30 on 29 September. The flight had lasted 118 hours and 41 minutes and covered 7,100 km (4,400 mi)

Between 17 and 19 October, a flight was undertaken for publicity purposes in which Dixmude flew over cities in the south and west of France including Toulouse, Nantes, Bordeaux and Lyon.

On 18 December, Dixmude left Cuers with the intention of making a return flight to In Salah, an oasis deep in the Sahara, carrying a crew of 40 and 10 passengers. On 19 December, the airship arrived at In Salah at 4 pm; Dixmude did not land, but dropped a bag of mail from the crew. The intention had been to make a stop at the Baraki airfield near Algiers; a north-west headwind caused du Plessis to alter course to the east, and the dirigible was seen crossing Tunisia on the evening of 20 December. The last radio message received from Dixmude was sent at 02:08, the airship reporting that it was reeling in its radio antenna due to a thunderstorm.

Railway workers in Sciacca, Sicily, were preparing to take out a train due to leave at 02:30 when they saw a bright flash in the western sky followed by a red glow that sank out of sight behind a hill, while a hunter on the seashore, watching the thunderstorm, saw a flash of lightning strike a cloud, followed by a red glare inside the cloud and four burning objects falling from the cloud. Later that morning, two aluminium fuel tanks washed up, bearing the numbers "75 L-72" and "S-2-48 LZ-113" and various other debris, including charred scraps of fabric and fragments of the duralumin girders. However, reports of these events did not reach the outside world for several days; the French government, unwilling to admit the possibility of the airship's loss for political reasons, apparently suppressed these reports and issued its own series of deliberately false reports of rumoured sightings of Dixmude which suggested that it had been blown inland over Africa. On 26 December, the body of du Plessis was discovered in a fishing net and identified by documents found in the coat pockets. France then publicly acknowledged the loss of Dixmude. The captain's watch was stopped at 02:27. Only one other body from the airship was recovered, that of radioman Antoine Guillaume, which was found four months later. The loss of Dixmude was the deadliest airship accident in history at the time, surpassed by the destruction of USS Akron in 1933, which killed 73 crewmen.

== Specifications ==
Data from Robinson 1973, p. 341.

General characteristics

- Length: 226.52 m (743 ft 2 in)
- Diameter: 23.90 m (78 ft 5 in)
- Volume: 68,490 m^{3} (2,418,700 cu ft)
- Powerplant: 6 × Maybach Mb IVa 6-cylinder water-cooled piston engine, 175 kW (235 hp) each

Performance

== Sources and references ==
- Robinson, Douglas H., Giants in the Sky. Henley-on Thames: Foulis, 1973 ISBN 0-85429-145-8
- Robinson, Douglas H., Mystery of the Dixmunde. Journal of the American Aviation Historical Society, Summer 1964
- Dixmude : l'histoire oubliée d'un dirigeable de la Marine
- Le dirigeable Dixmude (1920-1923) Cahier ARDHAN n° 44
- Le Dixmude
- Cuers-Pierrefeu Aerodrome with Dixmude Memorial
