= Jean du Plessis de Grenédan =

French naval officer

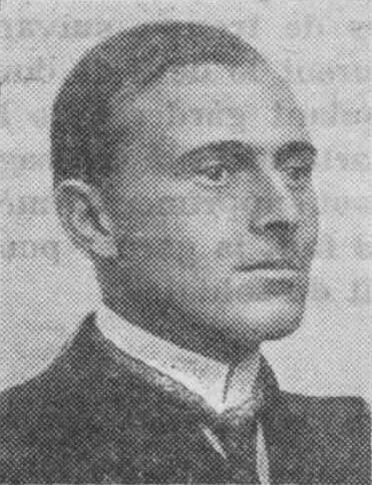
- Jean du Plessis de Grenédan in the Almanac de l'Action française of 1926.
- Born: 15 January 1892; Rennes, France
- Died: 22 December 1923 (aged 31); Mediterranean Sea
- Military career
- Allegiance: France
- Branch: French Navy
- Service years: 1909–1923
- Commands: Dixmude
- Conflicts: World War I
- Awards: Legion d'Honneur; Croix de Guerre

Jean Joseph Anne, comte du Plessis de Grenédan (1892–1923) was a French naval officer, who died on 21 or 22 December 1923 when the airship Dixmude, of which he was the commander, exploded over the Mediterranean Sea near Sicily.

== Early life ==
Jean Joseph Anne-Marie du Plessis was born in Rennes on 15 January 1892 as the second son of a lawyer at the bar of Rennes, Count Joachim du Plessis de Grenédan. His father participated in the creation of the Catholic Faculty of Angers. Jean completed his high school, from the fifth class, at the Collège Saint-Maurille.

On October 5, 1907, he entered the 'Naval Course' preparatory to the Ecole Navale at the college of Vaugirard in Paris to prepare for the entrance exam to the National Naval School. Following the end of the preparatory classes at the Vaugirard college, in October 1908, he completed his second year of 'Naval Studies’ at the Lycée Saint-Louis where he was an external student. This school is a boarding school at Massillon, run by priests of the Oratory that provide further studies for advanced students. He was received at the forty-first College Intake in August 1909. He joined the naval school and embarked on the Borda, a school ship that housed the Naval Academy from 1840 to 1913, on September 30, 1909.

He passed twenty-first at the Naval School in July 1911.

== Career ==
From 1911 to 1912, he made a tour in the West Indies and a tour in the Mediterranean and Baltic on the cruiser Duguay-Troui.

He was commissioned in 1917 as an airship pilot, and he became famous as commander of the Dixmude, one of the two zeppelins given to France as war reparations, and especially by establishing world records on board. His disappearance in the Mediterranean Sea, aboard the Dixmude, on the 21 or 22 December 1923, gave rise to a considerable controversy.

The airship LZ 114 was, at the time, the largest airship in the world, 226 m (743 ft) long.

In 1920, as a result of the armistice, the airship was delivered by the Germans to the French authorities in Maubeuge. Du Plessis de Grenédan named it Dixmude in memory of the Marines who had died defending the Belgian city of Diksmuide.

On the 10 August 1920, it was in working condition. It arrived on August 11 at 3 AM at Paris, flew over the Place de la Concorde and the Champs-Elysées, and went on to the Aviation Center of Cuers-Pierrefeu near Toulon

On the night of 21–22 December 1923, on its returning to Tunisia, the airship disappeared in a storm with 50 men on board (crew: 43, passengers: 7).

On 26 December, fishermen from Sciacca (Sicily) retrieved in their net the body of Jean du Plessis de Grenédan. In the pockets of his large coat, he was wearing were a rosary, a few medals, a purse, a bag containing a relic of Saint Marguerite - Marie of the Sacred Heart, an image of St. Christopher, some other objects and, attached to a gold chain, a steel watch stopped at 2.27.

This disaster marked the end of the use of dirigibles as military airships by the French.

Du Plessis de Grenédan was given a state funeral on 5 January 1924 in Toulon. He was decorated with the national order of the Legion of Honour, with citation of the Order of the Day for the Navy: "An elite officer, dedicated technician, communicating to all his spirit of duty, qualities of thoughtful boldness, brave eagerness and his disregard for danger." "For three years, he had displayed a high degree of the finest military qualifications in command of the airship Dixmude, on which he died gloriously at his post of duty."

== Sources ==
- Josselin du Plessis de Grenédan
- French Ministry (Department) of Defence
- Site de Bretagne Aviation

== Works ==
- Les Grands dirigeables dans la paix et dans la guerre (2 volumes); tome I : Leur passé, leur avenir, l'expérience du Dixmude - tome II : Leur technique; P., Plon, 1925. (in French) ("Large airships in peace and in war" (2 volumes). Volume I: Their past, their future, the experience of the Dixmude. - vol. II: Their technique. 1925. (released posthumously by his father).

== Bibliography ==
- Le Dixmude est-il perdu ?, La Libre Parole, no 11359, 27 December 1923
- Le Dixmude signalé en dérive vers le Hoggar, La Libre Parole, no 11360, 28 December 1923
- Le sort du Dixmude, le corps du Commandant du Plessis de Grenédan, La Libre Parole, no 11361, 29 December 1923
- La catastrophe du Dixmude, La Libre Parole, no 11362, 30 December 1923
- La perte du Dixmude, L'Illustration, 5 January 1924
- Du Plessis de Grenédan (Comte Joachim), La vie héroïque de Jean du Plessis, Commandant du "Dixmude" 1892-1923, P., Plon, 1924 (reissued, 1949), 364 pp, Illustrated.
- Jacquet (Bernard, La base aéronautique de Cuers-Pierre feu, du crash du Dixmude à nos jours; Hyères les palmiers, éd. du Lau, 2007, 224 p.
- L'épopée des Grands Dirigeables et du Dixmude, Michel Vaissier, November 2011. Mens Sana editions. Work selected to compete for the Guynemer Prize 2013 (at the salon du Bourget 2013).
