= Wilskerke =

- Deelgemeente
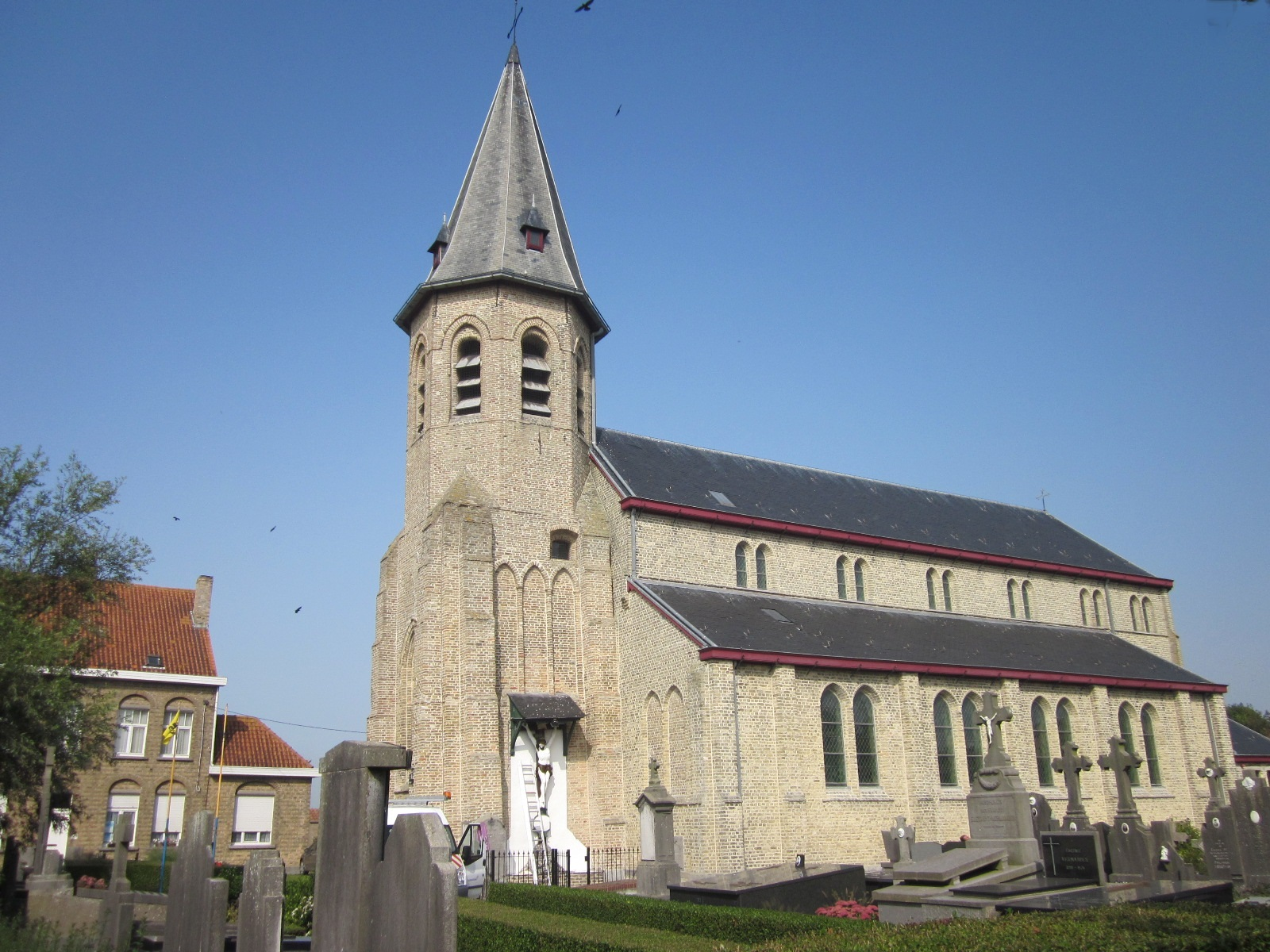
- Sint-Guilielmuskerk

- Coordinates: 51°10′53″N 2°50′26″E
- Country: Belgium
- Province: West Flanders
- Municipality: Middelkerke
- Source: NIS
- Postal code: 8431

Wilskerke is a small rural village in Belgium, situated in de Polder region, about 1.5 km from the coastline. In 1977, it became a part (deelgemeente) of the municipality of Middelkerke.
