= French ship Dixmude =

Three ships of the French Navy have been named Dixmude, in honour of the Fusiliers Marins at the battle of Diksmuide:

- French airship Dixmude, an airship, formerly the German LZ 114, lost at sea on 21 December 1923
- French aircraft carrier Dixmude, an aircraft carrier, formerly HMS Biter
- French ship Dixmude (L9015), the third French Mistral-class amphibious assault ship
