= Pierre Garbay =

French general

- Born: 4 October 1903; Gray, France
- Died: 17 July 1980 (aged 76) Montluçon, France
- Allegiance: France
- Branch: French Army
- Service years: 1924–1961
- Rank: Général d'Armée
- Conflicts: World War II
- Awards: Grand Cross of the Légion d'honneur Companion of the Liberation; Médaille militaire Croix de Guerre 1939-1945

Pierre Garbay (4 October 1903 – 17 July 1980) was a French Army General.

== Biography ==
Of modest origins, after completing high school, Garbay was admitted to Saint-Cyr military academy in 1921 and graduated as a sub-lieutenant in 1924. He then followed a distinguished military career which led from Morocco (1925-1927) to China.

He was captain when occurred the Armistice in 1940. He refused to accept it and as commander of the 3rd bataillon de marche of French Equatorial Africa played an active role in August 1940 in rallying Chad to France libre. Involved in the Free French Forces, he followed Leclerc up to 1944. He fought in Africa and Italy, and then participated to the landing in Provence. He was promoted général de brigade in 1944 and after the accidental death of general Diego Brosset on 20 November 1944, he succeeded him in the command of the 1st Free French Division. In April 1945, on the orders of General Charles de Gaulle, General Garbay took the 1st Free French Division to the Alpes-Maritimes, where, after 3 days of fierce fighting, they cleared the fortified Authion Massif, the key to the enemy's defensive system in the Southern Alps.

After the end of the war, Garbay's military career continued in Madagascar in June 1947 and then in Indochina.

He commanded the French troops in Tunisia and reacted to the terrorists attacks by the massacre of Cap Bon in 1952 (200 dead).

Then he commanded all the French troops from French Occidental Africa and Senegal, and he achieved the rank of lieutenant general. In 1955 he became Assistant Chief of Staff of the French Army and, in 1958, he was promoted to the rank of Army General and was appointed military governor of Paris. In 1959, he was appointed as Inspector of Overseas Forces.

On 1 April 1961, at his request, he relinquished control of the active army and he was placed in reserve. Pierre Garbay died on 17 July 1980 in Montluçon (Allier) and he was buried in Velesmes-Échevanne in Haute-Saône.

== Decorations ==
- Grand Cross of the Légion d'honneur
- Companion of the Liberation (25 June 1941)
- Croix de guerre 1939-1945 (7 citations)
- Croix de guerre des Théatres d'Opérations Exterieures (2 citations)
- Croix du combattant
- Croix du combattant volontaire 1939–1945
- Médaille de la Résistance with rosette.
- Médaille coloniale with "Maroc 1925", "AFL", "Erythrée", "Libye" and "Tunisie" bars
- Médaille commémorative des services volontaires dans la France libre
- Distinguished Service Cross(US)
- Distinguished Service Order (UK)
- Commander of the Order of the British Empire (UK)
