= Hubert Amyot D'Inville =

Hubert Amyot d'Inville (French: [ybɛʁ amjo dɛ̃vil]; 1 August 1909, in Beauvais, 10 June 1944 in Montefiascone) was a Free French Naval officer best known for commanding the 1er régiment de fusiliers marins detachment during the Battle of Bir Hakeim. He was killed in action on 10 June 1944 by a landmine while driving in his Jeep.
