= Middelkerke =

Municipality in Flemish Community, Belgium

- Municipality
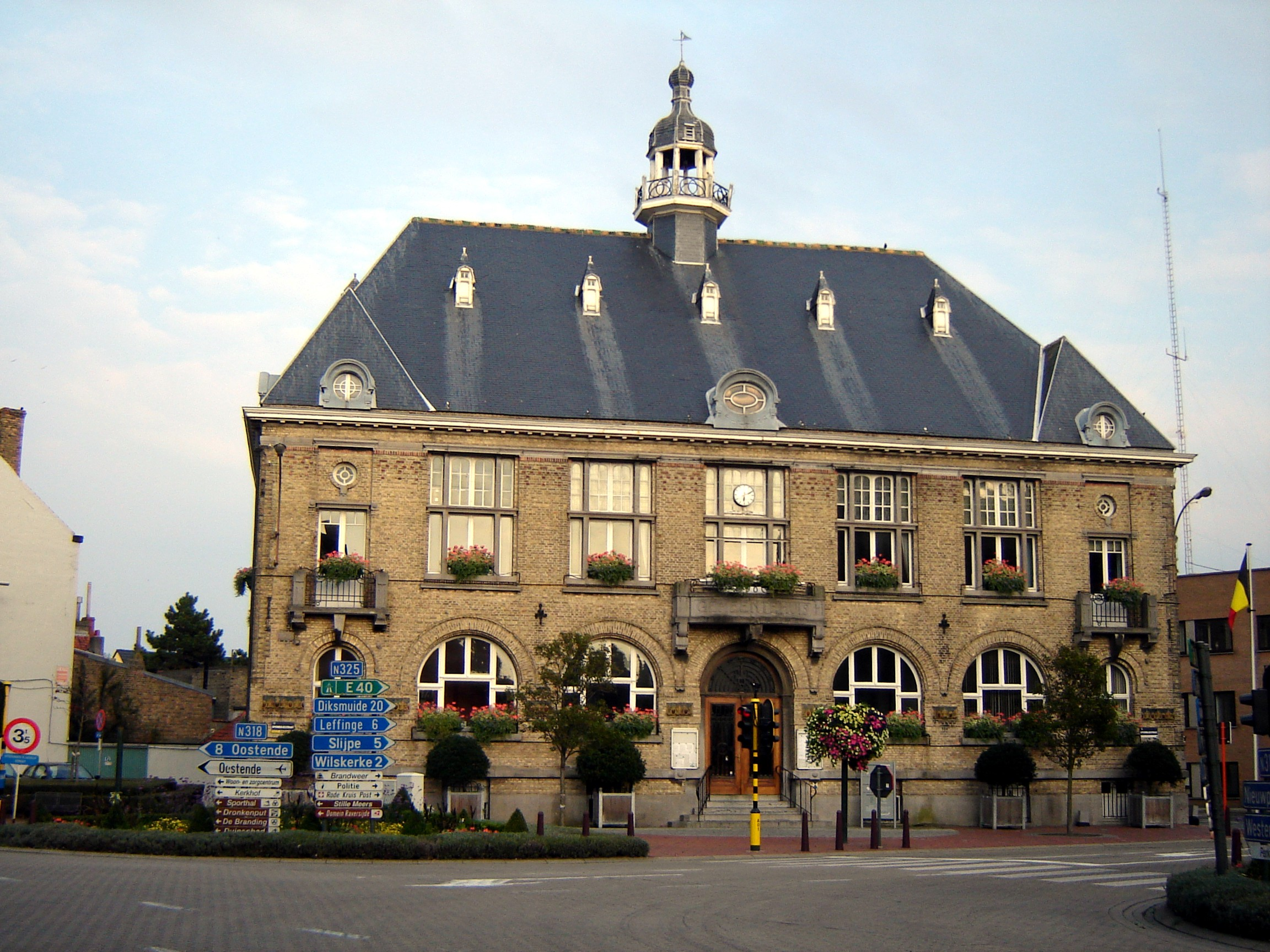
- Middelkerke town hall

- Flag Coat of arms

- Location of Middelkerke in West Flanders
- Interactive map of Middelkerke
- Location in Belgium
- Coordinates: 51°11′N 02°49′E
- Country: Belgium
- Community: Flemish Community
- Region: Flemish Region
- Province: West Flanders
- Arrondissement: Ostend

Government
  - Mayor: Jean-Marie Dedecker (LDD)
  - Governing parties: LDD, N-VA

Area
  - Total: 79.04 km^{2} (30.52 sq mi)

Population (2018-01-01)
  - Total: 19,371
  - Density: 245.1/km^{2} (634.8/sq mi)
- Postal codes: 8430-8434
- NIS code: 35011
- Area codes: 059
- Website: www.middelkerke.be

Middelkerke (Dutch pronunciation: [ˈmɪdəlˌkɛrkə]) is a municipality located in the Belgian province of West Flanders, on the North Sea, west of Ostend. The municipality comprises the villages of Leffinge, Lombardsijde, Mannekensvere, Middelkerke proper, Schore, Sint-Pieters-Kapelle, Slijpe, Westende and Wilskerke. On 1 January 2006 Middelkerke had a total population of 17,841. The total area is 75.65 km^{2} which gives a population density of 236 inhabitants per km^{2}.

The first reference of 'Middelkerca' is found in 1218. Before 1876 it mainly was a farming settlement.

In 1902, Middelkerke became the world's first municipality to have their drinking water disinfected by continuous chlorination.

The mayor of Middelkerke at this moment is Jean-Marie Dedecker.

== Sports ==
The Noordzeecross is a February cyclo-cross race held in Middelkerke, which is part of the Superprestige.
