= Mannekensvere =

- Deelgemeente
- Coordinates: 51°07′32″N 2°49′03″E
- Country: Belgium
- Province: West Flanders
- Municipality: Middelkerke
- Source: NIS
- Postal code: 8433

Mannekensvere is a small rural village in Belgium, located in the Polder region. Mannekensvere is a part ("deelgemeente") of the seaside municipality of Middelkerke. The village is located along the Yser river.

Mannekensvere was an independent municipality until 1971, when it became a part of the newly formed municipality Spermalie. In 1977, Spermalie was dissolved, and Mannekensvere was added to Middelkerke.
