= 1st Free French Division =

Military unit of the Free French Forces during World War II

1^{re} Division Française Libre
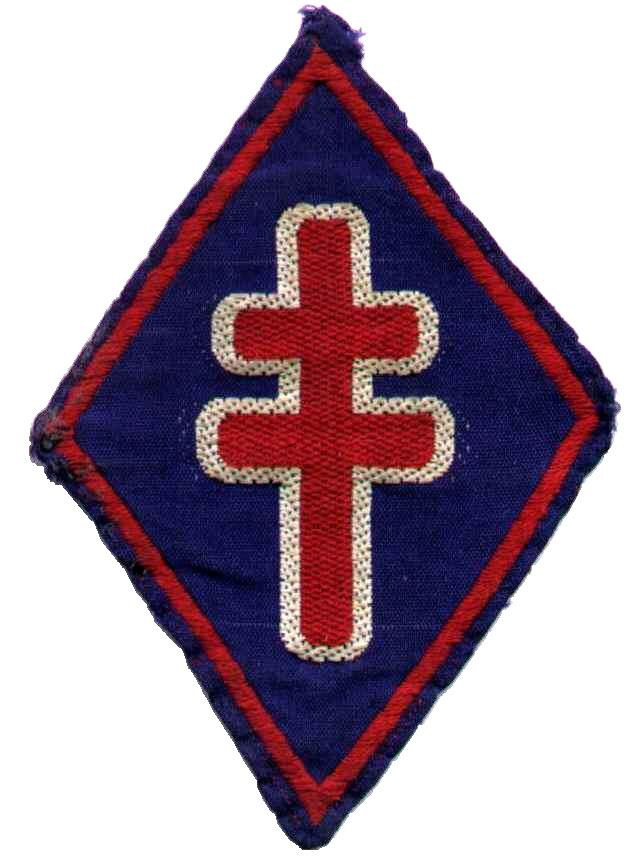
- Badge of the 1st Free French Division. The divisional badge features the Cross of Lorraine
- Active: 1 August 1940 – 15 August 1945
- Country: France
- Allegiance: (France) French Army; Free French Forces
- Type: Infantry Division
- Equipment: French, British, American
- Engagements: Dakar; Gabon; Eritrea; Syria; Lebanon; Bir Hakeim; El Alamein; Tunisia; Italy; Provence; Vosges; Alsace; Authion

Commanders
- Notable commanders: Raoul Magrin-Vernerey; Paul Legentilhomme; Marie Pierre Kœnig; Edgard de Larminat; Diego Brosset; Pierre Garbay

The 1st Free French Division (French: 1^{re} Division Française Libre, 1^{re} DFL) was one of the principal units of the Free French Forces (FFL) during World War II, renowned for having fought the Battle of Bir Hakeim.

Consisting of troops from mainland France and from the then French colonial empire, the division was formed by the first units to rally to de Gaulle after the fall of France. Together with the 3rd Algerian Infantry Division, it was the most decorated French division of the Second World War.

== Creation and different nominations ==
- 1940: Free French Expeditionary Corps.
- 1941: Free French Orient Brigade.
- May 1941: 1st Light Free French Division.
- 20 August 1941: dissolution following the campaign of Syria.
- 24 September 1941: regrouping of the Free French units of the Middle East into the 1st and 2nd Light Free French Divisions (divisions with two brigades each).
- December 1941: the 1st Light Free French Division, reworked into the 1st Free French Brigade Group to adapt itself to the British military organization, deploys to the Western Desert.
- 1942: regrouping of the two independent Free French brigades of the Moyent-Orient (Middle East) into the French Forces of the Western Desert, following the departure of the 2nd Independent Free French Brigade from the Levant on April.
- February 1943: recreated under the designation of 1st Free French Division - 1^{e} DFL (division with three brigades 1^{re}, 2^{e} and 4^{e} BFL).
- August 1943: renamed 1st Infantry Marching Division (1^{re} D.M.I.). Only Gaullist activists continue to call the division 1st D.F.L.
- 15 August 1945: dissolution.

== World War II ==
=== 1940 ===
The 1^{re} DFL officially formed on 1 February 1943 and was dissolved on 15 August 1945. However, for the veterans of this unit, the history of the division began in the summer of 1940.

In London, on 30 June 1940, amongst the troops that fought in Norway, 900 men of the 13th Demi-Brigade of Foreign Legion, commanded by Lieutenant-Colonel Raoul Magrin-Vernerey, and 60 Chasseurs Alpins made the choice to resume combat. Elements of a tank company, sappers, artillerymen and sailors chose the same: they would later constitute the 1^{er} Régiment de Fusiliers Marins, 1^{er} RFM.

In the Middle East, 350 men of a battalion stationed in Cyprus, led by Captain Jean Lorotte de Banes passed to British Egypt. With 120 men of Captain Raphaël Folliot, who left French Lebanon on 27 June, they formed the 1st Marine Infantry Battalion, 1^{er} BIM. They were joined by legionnaires of the 6th Foreign Infantry Regiment (6^{e} REI), sailors of the French Naval Squadron Force X, and a squadron of Moroccan Spahis of the 1st Spahi Regiment, commanded by Captain Paul Jourdier.

In Africa, part of the 31st battery of the 6th Marine Artillery Regiment (French: 6^{e} Régiment d'artillerie de marine, 6^{e} RAMa), stationed at Bobo-Dioulasso, commanded by Captain Jean-Claude Laurent-Champrosay, passed from the French Upper Volta to the British Cameroons, forming the 1st Colonial Artillery Regiment (1^{er} Régiment d'artillerie coloniale, 1^{er} RAC).

Under the designation of Free French Expeditionary Corps (French: Corps expéditionnaire français libre), the troops formed in London disembarked at Freetown in Sierra Leone and participated in the unsuccessful Battle of Dakar, before being directed, in October 1940, to Douala in the French Cameroons. In November 1940, the unit participated in the Battle of Gabon, before going to Durban in South Africa.

=== 1941 ===
Designated as the Free French Orient Brigade (French: Brigade Française Libre d'Orient) and commanded by Colonel Magrin-Vernerey, the brigade left Durban and disembarked at Suakin to take part in the East African Campaign. The brigade was reinforced by the Pacific Battalion (French: Bataillon du Pacifique) and by troops of the French Equatorial Africa, the latter going from Brazzaville to Bangui, N'Djamena, before finally arriving at Khartoum and Suakin. The brigade participated in the Battle of Keren.

Under the designation of 1st Light Free French Division (French: Première Division Légère Française Libre) and under the command of General Paul Legentilhomme, the division joined the Syria–Lebanon Campaign in June 1941, where they fought against fellow Frenchmen, aligned with Vichy. The division entered into Damascus on 21 June 1941, then continued to Homs, Aleppo, Beirut and arrived at Cairo, where the division was dissolved.

The division is reconstituted under the form of two Free French brigades:

- The 1st Independent Free French Brigade, 1^{e} BFL, commanded by General Koenig
- The 2nd Independent Free French Brigade, 2^{e} BFL, commanded by General Cazaud
- A 3rd Independent Free French Brigade remained in French Lebanon and Syria until the end of the war to ensure the protection of these two countries.

=== 1942 ===
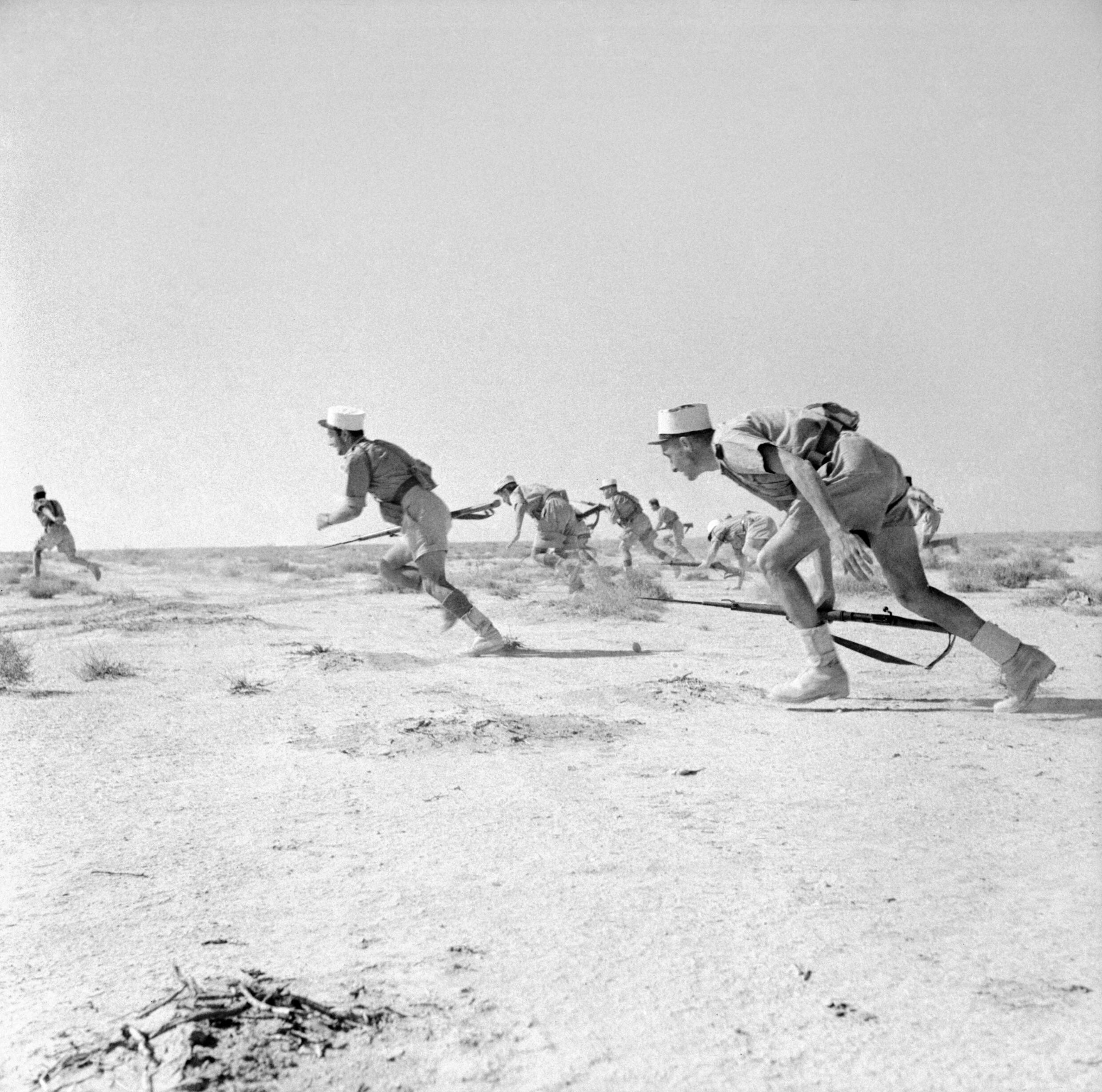
Free French Foreign Legionnaires assaulting an enemy strong point at the Battle of Bir Hakeim

The 1^{e} BFL distinguished itself at the Battle of Bir Hakeim from 26 May – 11 June 1942, then in the Second Battle of El Alamein from October–November 1942.

The two brigades and the Free French Flying Column formed the French Forces of the Western Desert (French: Forces françaises du Western Desert), part of the British Eighth Army.

=== 1943 ===
These two brigades (plus a third coming from Djibouti), are united on 1 February 1943 in the 1st Free French Division, 1^{re} DFL, commanded by General Edgard de Larminat and participate in the Tunisian Campaign.

In June 1943, various troops of the Army of Africa (French: l'Armée d'Afrique) joined the ranks of the division. Accordingly, the division was sent to the desert of Libya during two and a half months, at the request of Henri Giraud. The 2^{e} DFL of General Leclerc would follow the same procedure.

After the reunification of the two French forces, on 1 August 1943, the division was officially designated as 1st Motorized Infantry Division (French: 1^{re} Division Motorisée d'Infanterie, 1^{re} DMI) due to its integration in the French Expeditionary Corps in Italy. In 1944, the 1st Motorized Infantry Division became the 1st Marching Infantry Division (French: 1^{re} Division de Marche d'Infanterie, 1^{re} DMI). Nevertheless, the unit remained known as the 1^{re} DFL.

=== 1944 ===
Commanded by General Diego Brosset and now part of the French Expeditionary Corps, the division participated in the Italian Campaign since April 1944.

With First Army, the division disembarked in Provence on 15 August 1944 and participated in the Battle of Toulon, then went up the Rhône after having sent a couple of reconnaissance squadrons to Montpellier. Lyon was reached on 3 September.

In autumn 1944, the French Forces of the Interior joined the First Army, replacing the 6000 Africans of the division in what was referred during that period as blanchiment (whitening).

General Brosset accidentally died on 20 November 1944 and was succeeded by General Pierre Garbay.

=== 1945 ===
The division made its way to the Vosges where it faced Operation Nordwind, the last major German offensive on the Western Front. Afterwards it joined the battles for the Colmar Pocket. In March 1945, the division participated in the Battle of Authion. It then took Tende and La Brigue. When it was about to march on Turin the German Army in Italy surrendered on 2 May 1945.

== Composition ==
=== Infantry ===
==== 1^{re} Brigade ====
- 1st battalion of the 13th Demi-Brigade of Foreign Legion, 13^{e} DBLE
- 2nd battalion of the 13th Demi-Brigade of Foreign Legion
- 22nd North-African Marching Battalion (French: 22^{e} Bataillon Nord-Africain, 22^{e} BMNA)

==== 2^{e} Brigade ====
- Marching Battalion nº 4, BM 4
- Marching Battalion nº 5, BM 5
- Marching Battalion nº 11, BM 11 (constituted in Syria in 1941)

==== 4^{e} Brigade ====
- Marching Battalion nº 21, BM 21 (constituted in Djibouti in 1943)
- Marching Battalion nº 24, BM 24 (same origin of BM 21)
- Marine Infantry and Pacific Battalion (grouping of the 1st Marine Infantry Battalion and the Pacific Battalion nº 1 following the Battle of Bir Hakeim).

==== Units disbanded before 1944 ====
- Marching Battalion nº 1, BM 1. With the 1^{e} DFL, the battalion participated to the campaigns of Gabon, East Africa and Syria. The battalion then participated in the Tunisian Campaign with the 2nd Armored Division before being disbanded 1943.
- Marching Battalion nº 2, BM 2. Attached to the 3rd Independent Free French Brigade, in Syria, in July 1942, it was then sent to Madagascar and to the French Equatorial Africa.
- Marching Battalion nº 3, BM 3. Disbanded in 1942.

=== Other units ===
- 1^{er} Régiment de Fusiliers Marins, 1^{er} RFM
- 1^{er} Régiment de Marche de Spahis Marocains
- 1st Tank company (then 501^{e} Régiment de chars de combat in the 2^{e} DB).
- 11^{e} Régiment de cuirassiers (French: 11^{e} Régiment de cuirassiers)
- 1st Artillery Regiment of Free French Forces, RAFFL
- 21st anti-aircraft group of the Antilles
- 1st Engineering Battalion
- 4th Anti-Tank company
- Headquarters Company
- 101st Auto Company
- 1st Signals Battalion
- 9th Maintenance Company
- 1st Traffic Detachment
- Military Police
- Division Logistics
- Hadfield-Spears Ambulance Unit
- Light Surgical Ambulance
- Naval Female Medical Evacuation Section

== Decorations ==
The division was cited 4 times at the orders of the armed forces (26 June 1942, following the battle of Bir Hakeim; 27 January 1945, for Italy, the Vosges; 16 March 1945, for combats in Alsace; 7 July 1945, for the campaign of Authion) and the principal forming regiments were awarded the French Fourragere for 2 citations at the orders of the armed forces.

- Fourragere with olive colors of the Médaille militaire and Croix de Guerre 1939–1945 (4–5 citations at the orders of the armed forces)
  - 13th Demi-Brigade of Foreign Legion 13^{e} DBLE
  - Marine Infantry and Pacific Battalion
  - 1^{er} Régiment de Fusiliers Marins 1^{e} RFM
- Fourragere with olive colors of the Croix de Guerre 1939–1945 (2–3 citations at the orders of the armed forces)
  - Marching Battalion 2
  - Marching Battalion 5

== Division Commanders ==
- 1941: Colonel Raoul Magrin-Vernerey
- 15 April 1941 – 21 August 1941: General Paul Legentilhomme
- January 1943 – 16 May 1943: General Edgard de Larminat
- 1943: General Marie-Pierre Kœnig
- 1 August 1943: General Diego Brosset
- 20 November 1944: General Pierre Garbay

== Homages ==
Forty-eight cemeteries, are the resting places of the more than 3600 members of the division. Eight of the division's units were made Compagnons de la Libération. Four members of the division represent the combatants in uniform resting at the Mémorial de la France combattante at au Mont Valérien, Nous sommes ici pour témoigner devant l'Histoire que de 1939 à 1945 ses fils ont lutté pour que la France vive libre:

- Maboulkede (1921–1944) – Soldier of the 24th Marching Battalion, BM 24
- Georges Brière (1922–1944) – Sailor of the 1^{er} Régiment de Fusiliers Marins, 1^{er} RFM
- Marius Duport (1919–1944) – Sous-lieutenant of the 22nd North African Marching Battalion 22^{e} BMNA
- Antonin Mourgues (1919–1942) – Caporal-chef au Marine Infantry and Pacific Battalion, BIMP

== Casualties ==
The division endured the loss of 3619 killed in action (out of which 1126 Colonial Indigenous (French: Indigènes Coloniaux)) with 67% killed in the period of April 1944 to May 1945.

== See also ==
- Free France
- Liberation of France
- Order of Liberation
- 2nd Armored Division
- Régiment de marche du Tchad

== Sources & bibliography ==
- Jean de Lattre de Tassigny, Histoire de la première armée française, éd. Plon, 1949
- Foreign Volunteers of the Allied Forces 1939–45. Nigel Thomas. London: Osprey Publishing, 1991.
- GUF – Guerre 1939 – 1945. Les Grandes Unités Françaises (Volume V-2). Armée de Terre, Service Historique. Paris: Imprimerie Nationale, 1975.
- La 1^{re} D.F.L.. Boussard, Leon. Bobigny: L'Imprimerie de Bobigny (Seine), 1946.
- The French Army 1939–45 (2). Ian Sumner. London: Osprey Publishing, 1998.
- (in French) FAQ (with some pictures) on the 1re D.F.L., a unit frequently eclipsed by the 2nd (Armoured) Free French Division.
- Forum posting of TO&E of the predecessor elements of the 1re D.F.L, with reference to other FFL units in North Africa
- Annuaire de la 1^{re} DFL, Collectif, 1972
