= Pierre Alexis Ronarc'h =

French admiral (1865–1940)

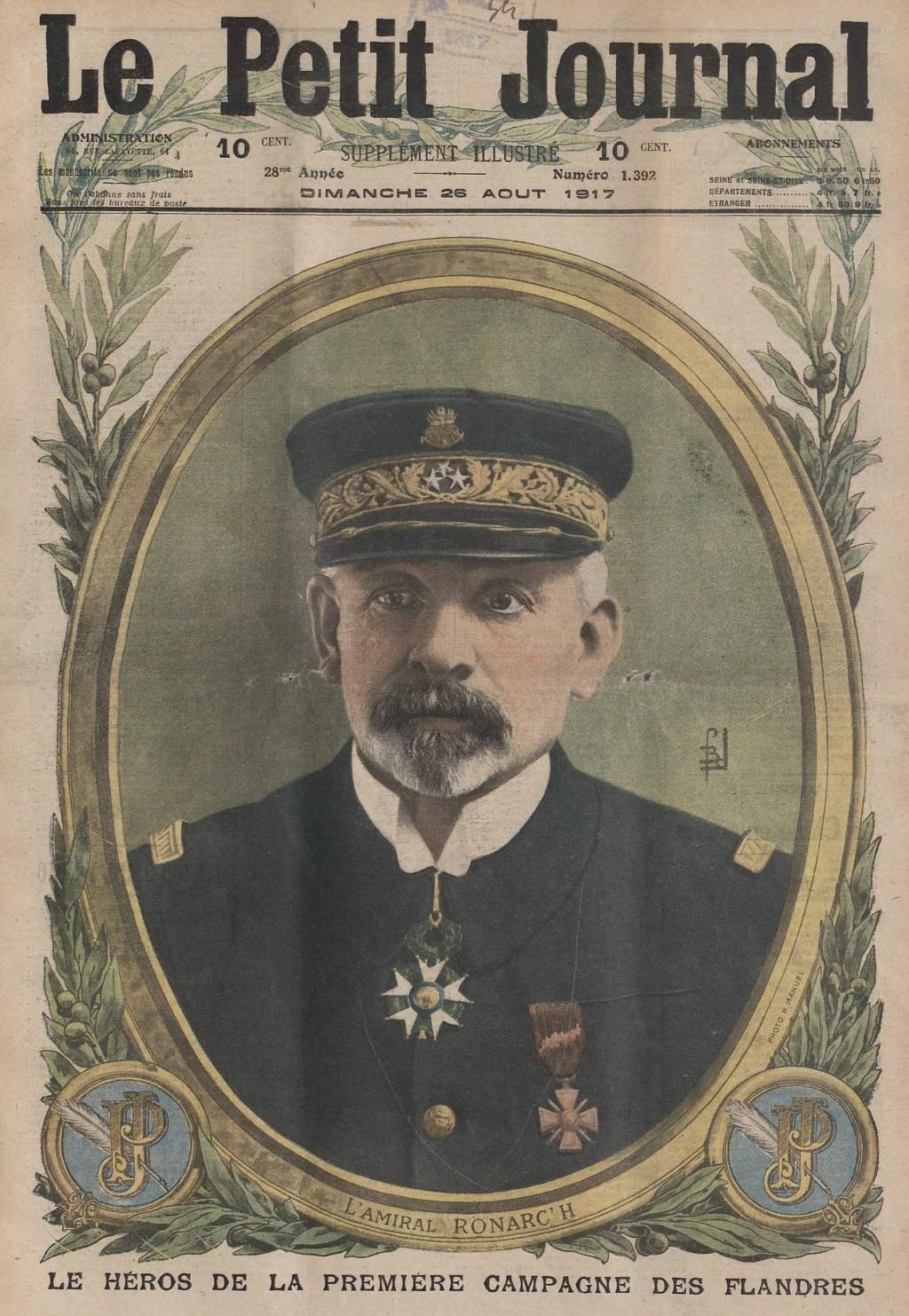
Admiral Ronarc'h in 1917.

Pierre-Alexis Ronarc'h (French: [pjɛʁ alɛksi ʁɔnaʁ(k)]) was a French sailor and admiral, born on 22 November 1865 in Quimper and died 1 April 1940 in Paris.

He is notable for commanding the French Brigade de Fusiliers Marins at the Battle of the Yser in 1914 during the First World War. Between 1915 and 1919 he was in command of the naval forces between Nieuwpoort (Belgium) and Antifer (north of Le Havre), called the Zone des Armées du Nord (ZAN). Based in Dunkirk, his mission was to keep German Navy ships and submarines out of the Dover Channel, in close collaboration with the British Dover Patrol.

In May 1919, the ZAN was dissolved and Ronarc'h became Chief of Staff of the French Navy, a post he held until 1 February 1920, when he was replaced by Henri Salaun.

The Ronarc'h Peninsula of Kerguelen and the French frigate Amiral Ronarc'h, launched in 2022 and commissioned in 2026, are named after him.
