= Battle of the Yser =

1914 battle of the First World War

- Part of the Race to the Sea on the Western Front in the First World War
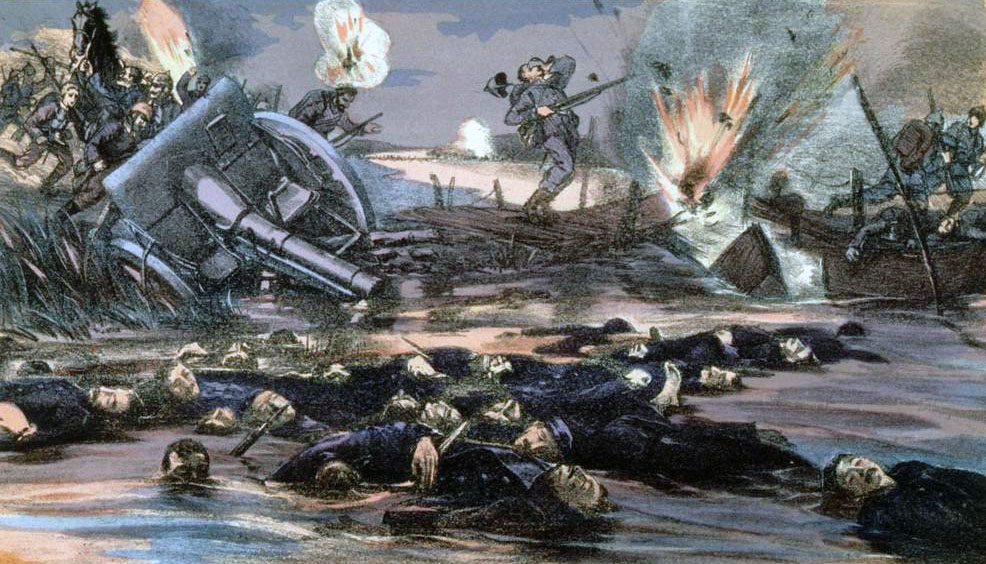
- Depiction of combat between Belgian and German forces
Date	16–31 October 1914
Location	River Yser and Ieperlee, Belgium 51°09′10″N 02°43′23″E
Result	Allied victory
Territorial changes	Yser Front created

Belligerents
Belgium; France; United Kingdom	German Empire

Commanders and leaders
(Belgium); King Albert I; Émile Dossin; Augustin Michel; Jules Jacques; (French Third Republic); Pierre Ronarc'h; Paul Grossetti; (United Kingdom of Great Britain and Ireland); Horace Hood	(German Empire) Albrecht of Württemberg; Hans von Beseler

Strength
Belgium: 52,000 men; France: 6,600 men (1,450 infantry); Britain: 3 monitors; auxiliary ships	60,000–85,000

Casualties and losses
Belgium: 3,500 killed; 15,000 wounded	Germany: 76,250 (from 18 October to 30 November 1914, between Gheluvelt and the coast)

The Battle of the Yser (Note: French: Bataille de l'Yser; Dutch: Slag om de IJzer and German: Schlacht an der Yser) was a battle of the First World War that took place in October 1914 between the towns of Nieuwpoort and Diksmuide, along a 35 km (22 mi) stretch of the Yser River and the Yperlee Canal, in Belgium. The front line was held by a large Belgian force, which halted the German advance in a costly defensive battle.

The victory at the Yser allowed Belgium to retain a small strip of territory, with Germany in control of 95 per cent of Belgian territory, which made King Albert a Belgian national hero, sustained national pride and provided a venue for commemorations of heroic sacrifice for the next hundred years.

== Background ==
=== German invasion of Belgium ===
On 2 August 1914, the Belgian government refused passage through Belgium to German troops and on the night of 3/4 August the Belgian General Staff ordered the Third Division to Liège to obstruct a German advance. The German army invaded Belgium on the morning of 4 August. Covered by the Third Division, the Liège fortress garrison, a screen of the Cavalry Division and detachments from Liège and Namur, the Belgian field army closed up to the river Gete and by 4 August, the First Division had assembled at Tienen, the Fifth Division at Perwez, the Second Division at Leuven and the Sixth Division at Wavre, covering central and western Belgium and communications towards Antwerp. German cavalry appeared at Visé early on 4 August, to find the bridge down and Belgian troops on the west bank; the Germans crossed at a ford and forced the Belgians to retire towards Liège. By evening, it was clear to the Belgian High Command that the Third Division and the Liège garrison were in the path of a very large invasion force.

With information that five German corps and six reserve corps were in Belgium and with no immediate support available from the French army and British Expeditionary Force (BEF), the Belgian field army was ordered to withdraw towards the National Redoubt on the evening of 18 August and arrived on 20 August. At an engagement between the First Division and the German IX Corps near Tienen, the Belgians suffered 1,630 casualties. The Belgian government of Charles de Broqueville left Brussels for Antwerp and the Belgian capital was occupied unopposed on 20 August, as the Belgian field army completed its retreat to Antwerp. The German Siege of Namur ended with a Belgian capitulation on 24 August, as the field army made a sortie from Antwerp towards Brussels. The Germans detached the III Reserve Corps from the 1st Army to mask the city and a division of the IV Reserve Corps to occupy Brussels.

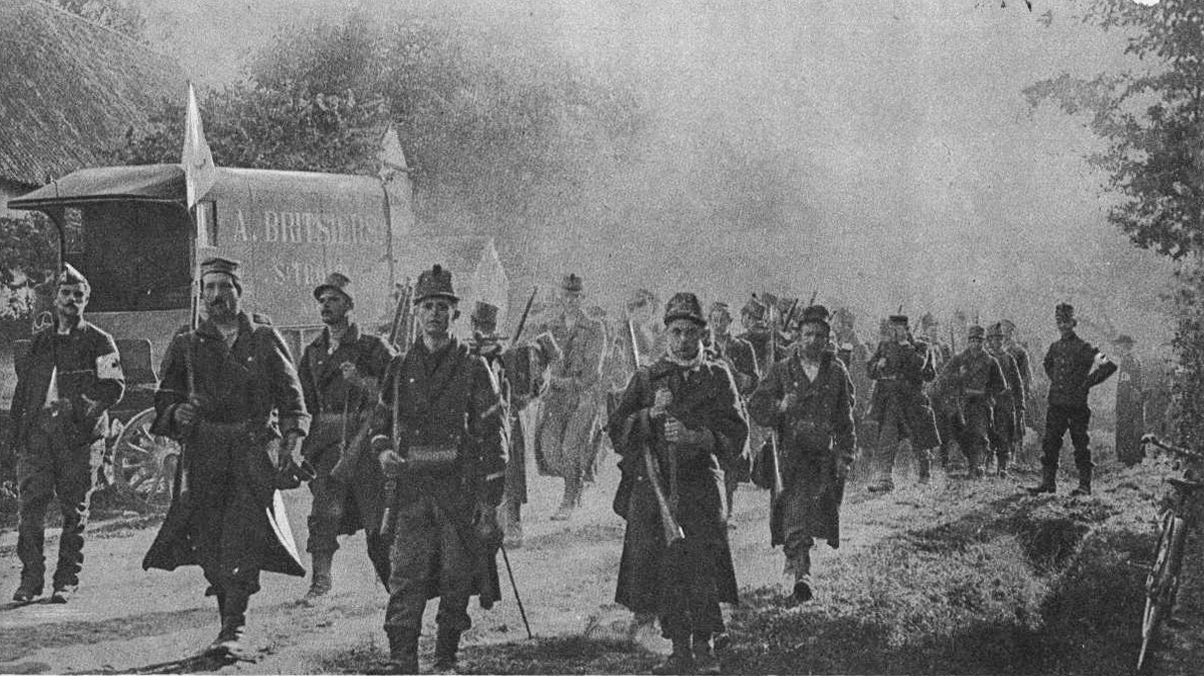
Belgian soldiers pictured during the retreat towards Antwerp in August 1914

On 1 October, General Hans Hartwig von Beseler ordered an attack on the Antwerp forts Sint-Katelijne-Waver, Walem and the Bosbeek and Dorpveld redoubts by the 5th Reserve and Marine divisions. By 11:00 a.m. Fort Walem was severely damaged, Fort Lier had been hit by a 16 in (410 mm) shell, Fort Koningshooikt and the Tallabert and Bosbeek redoubts were mostly intact and the intervening ground between Fort Sint-Katelijne-Waver and Dorpveld redoubt had been captured. A counter-attack failed and the Fourth Division was reduced to 4,800 infantry. The Belgian commanders ordered the left flank of the army to withdraw to a line north of the Nete, which covered the gap in the outer defences and kept the city out of range of German super-heavy artillery. Proclamations warning the inhabitants that King Albert I and the government would leave Antwerp were put up during the day. Early on 9 October, German troops found some forts of the inner ring empty; Beseler ended the bombardment and summoned the military governor, General Victor Deguise, to surrender. About 30,000 men of the Antwerp garrison surrendered and the city was occupied by German troops. About 33,000 soldiers of the garrison (c. 30 per cent of the Belgian Army) fled north to the Netherlands, where they were interned for the duration.

During the siege of Antwerp, the German and French armies fought the Battle of the Frontiers (7 August – 13 September) and then the German armies in the north pursued the French and the BEF southwards into France in the Great Retreat, which culminated in the First Battle of the Marne (5–12 September), followed by the First Battle of the Aisne (13–28 September). Reciprocal attempts by the Franco-British and German armies to envelop the northern flank of the opposing army, the Race to the Sea took place through Picardy, Artois and Flanders (17 September – 19 October. The "race" ended on the North Sea coast of Belgium, when the last open area from Diksmuide to the North Sea was occupied by Belgian troops from Antwerp.

=== Allied retreat to the Yser ===
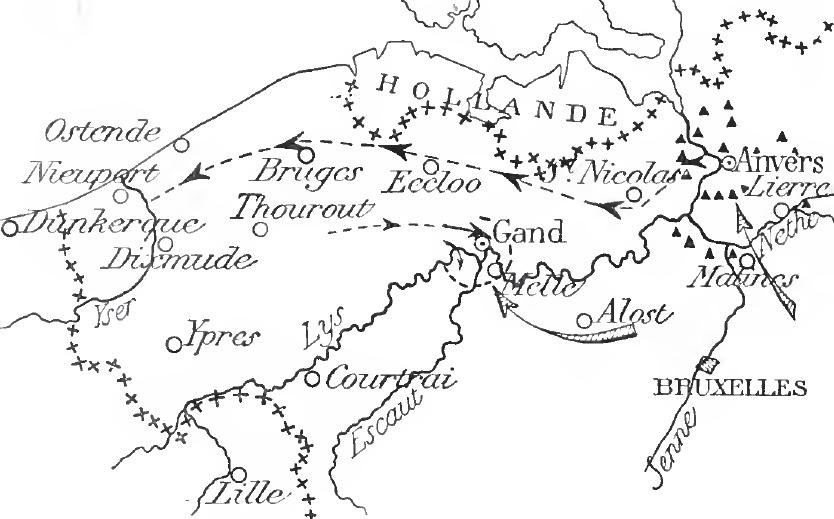
Fall of Antwerp and the Allied retreat, 1914

British and French forces in Belgium covered the withdrawal of the Belgians and British from Antwerp. The First, Third and Fourth divisions reached Ostend, the Fifth and Sixth divisions arrived at Torhout and Diksmuide and the Antwerp garrison troops moved to an area north-west of Ghent. The Germans 4th Ersatz Division and Landwehr troops at Lokeren and Moerbeke turned east towards Ghent before the withdrawal was discovered. The III Reserve Corps and the 4th Ersatz Division were then ordered to turn west and advance on Kortrijk, to prolong the main German front, before being sent towards Ghent and Bruges, with orders to reach Blankenberge and Ostend on the coast. On 11 October, German troops were detected advancing on Ghent, by which time the Belgian fortress troops had joined the field army. A retreat from Ghent from 3:00 to 10:00 p.m. began, after which German troops entered the city. Several bridges were demolished during the retirement, although crowds of civilians on the main road and rail bridges led to them being left intact.

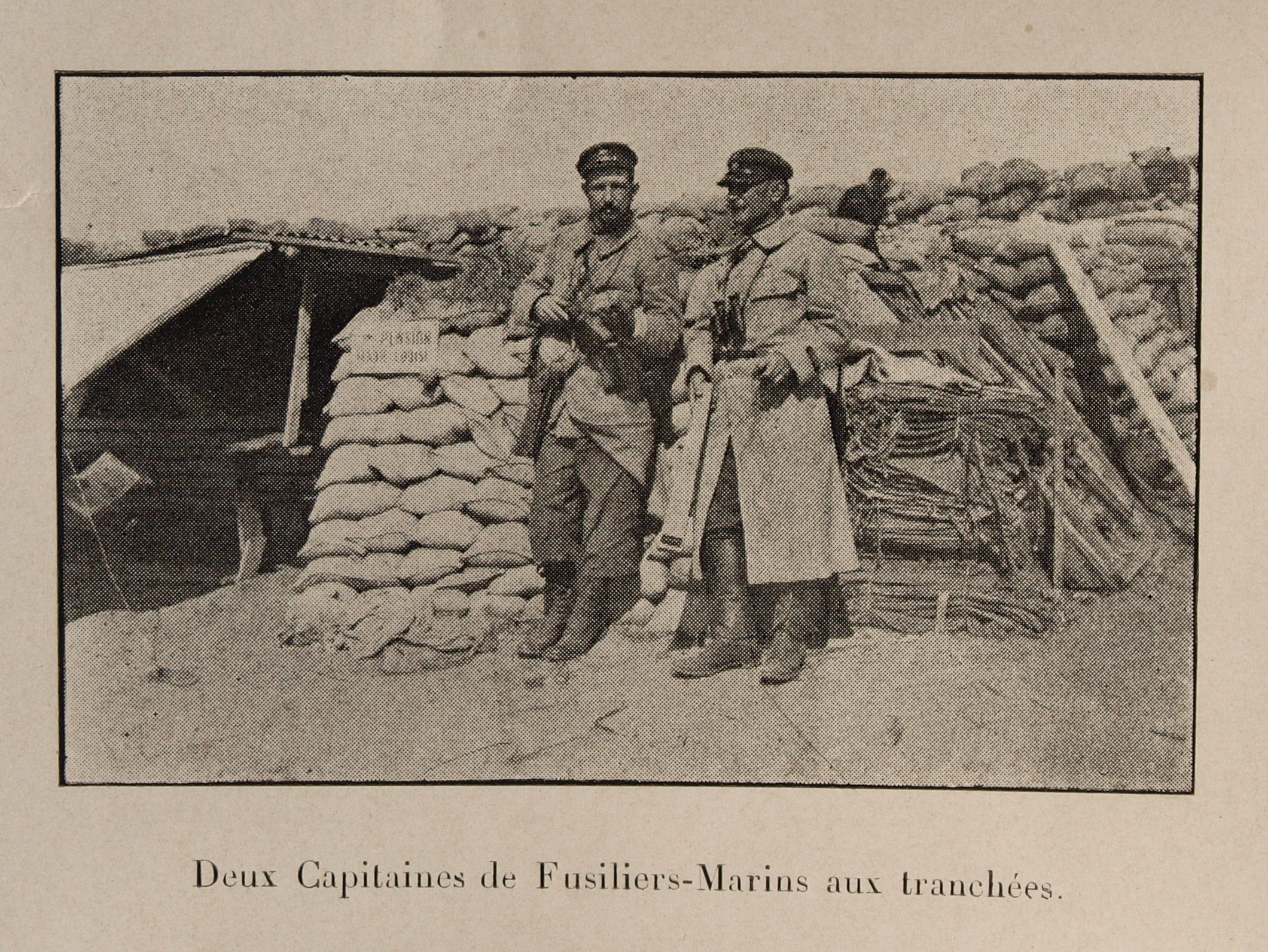
Captains of the French Fusiliers marins at the Yser

By 18 October, the Belgian, British and French troops in northern France and Belgium had formed a defensive line, the British II Corps assembled with the 5th Division from La Bassée Canal north to Beau Puits, the 3rd Division from Illies to Aubers and three divisions of the French Cavalry Corps (General Louis Conneau) deployed from Fromelles to Le Maisnil. The British III Corps had the 6th Division from Radinghem to Epinette and the 4th Division from Epinette to Pont Rouge, the BEF Cavalry Corps with the 1st and 2nd Cavalry divisions, from Deûlémont to Tenbrielen. The British IV Corps with the 7th Division and 3rd Cavalry Division from Zandvoorde to Oostnieuwkerke; the French Groupe Bidon and the de Mitry Cavalry Corps covered the ground from Roeselare (Roulers) to Kortemark (Cortemarck), the 87th and 89th Territorial divisions from Passendale (Passchendaele) to Boezinge (Boesinghe) and then the Belgian field army and fortress troops from Boezinge to Nieuwpoort. The Brigade de Fusiliers Marins (Rear-Admiral Pierre Alexis Ronarc'h) with six battalions, mostly reservists, with 6,670 men of whom 1,450 were fusiliers, a machine-gun company (16 guns) and four machine-guns in each battalion. were sent from Pierrefitte, near Paris to Flanders on 7 October and by 18 October were at Diksmuide (Dixmude).

=== Flanders terrain ===
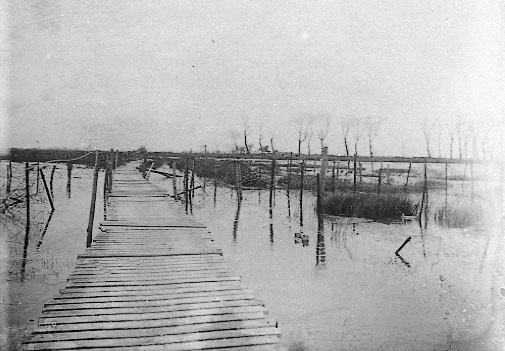
View of the flooding in Ramskapelle

Part of northern France and north Belgium from the Pas-de-Calais to the Scheldt estuary had been known as Flanders since the eleventh century. West of a line between Arras and Calais in the north of France lie chalk downlands covered with soil sufficient for arable farming, and east of the line the land declines in a series of spurs into the Flanders plain. By 1914, the plain was bounded by canals linking Douai, Béthune, Saint-Omer and Calais. To the south-east, canals run between Lens, Lille, Roubaix and Kortrijk, the Lys river from Kortrijk to Ghent and to the north-west lies the sea. The plain is almost flat, apart from a line of low hills from Cassel, east to Mont des Cats (Katsberg), Zwarteberg (Mont Noir), Rodeberg (Mont Rouge), Scherpenberg and Kemmelberg (Mount Kemmel). From Kemmel, a low ridge lies to the north-east, declining in elevation past Ypres through Wijtschate (Wytschaete), Geluveld (Gheluvelt) and Passendale (Passchendaele), curving north then north-west to Diksmuide where it merges with the plain. A coastal strip about 10 mi (16 km) wide is near sea level and fringed by sand dunes. Inland the ground is mainly meadow, cut by canals, dykes, drainage ditches and roads built up on causeways. The Lys, Yser and the upper Scheldt have been canalised and between them the water level underground is close to the surface, rises further in the autumn and fills any dip, the sides of which then collapse. The ground surface quickly turns to a consistency of cream cheese and on the coast troop movements were confined to roads, except during frosts.

The rest of the Flanders Plain is woods and small fields, divided by hedgerows planted with trees and cultivated from small villages and farms. The terrain was difficult for infantry operations because of the lack of observation, impossible for mounted action because of the many obstructions and difficult for artillery because of the limited view. South of La Bassée Canal around Lens and Béthune was a coal-mining district full of slag heaps, pit heads (fosses) and miners' houses (corons). North of the canal, the cities of Lille, Tourcoing and Roubaix form a manufacturing complex, with outlying industries at Armentières, Comines, Halluin and Menen, along the Lys river, with isolated sugar beet and alcohol refineries and a steel works near Aire-sur-la-Lys. Intervening areas are agricultural, with wide roads on shallow foundations, unpaved mud tracks in France and narrow pavé roads along the frontier and in Belgium. In France, the roads were closed by the local authorities during thaws to preserve the surface and marked by Barrières fermėes, which in 1914 were ignored by British lorry drivers. The difficulty of movement after the end of summer absorbed much of the civilian labour available on road maintenance, leaving field defences to be built by front-line soldiers.

== Prelude ==
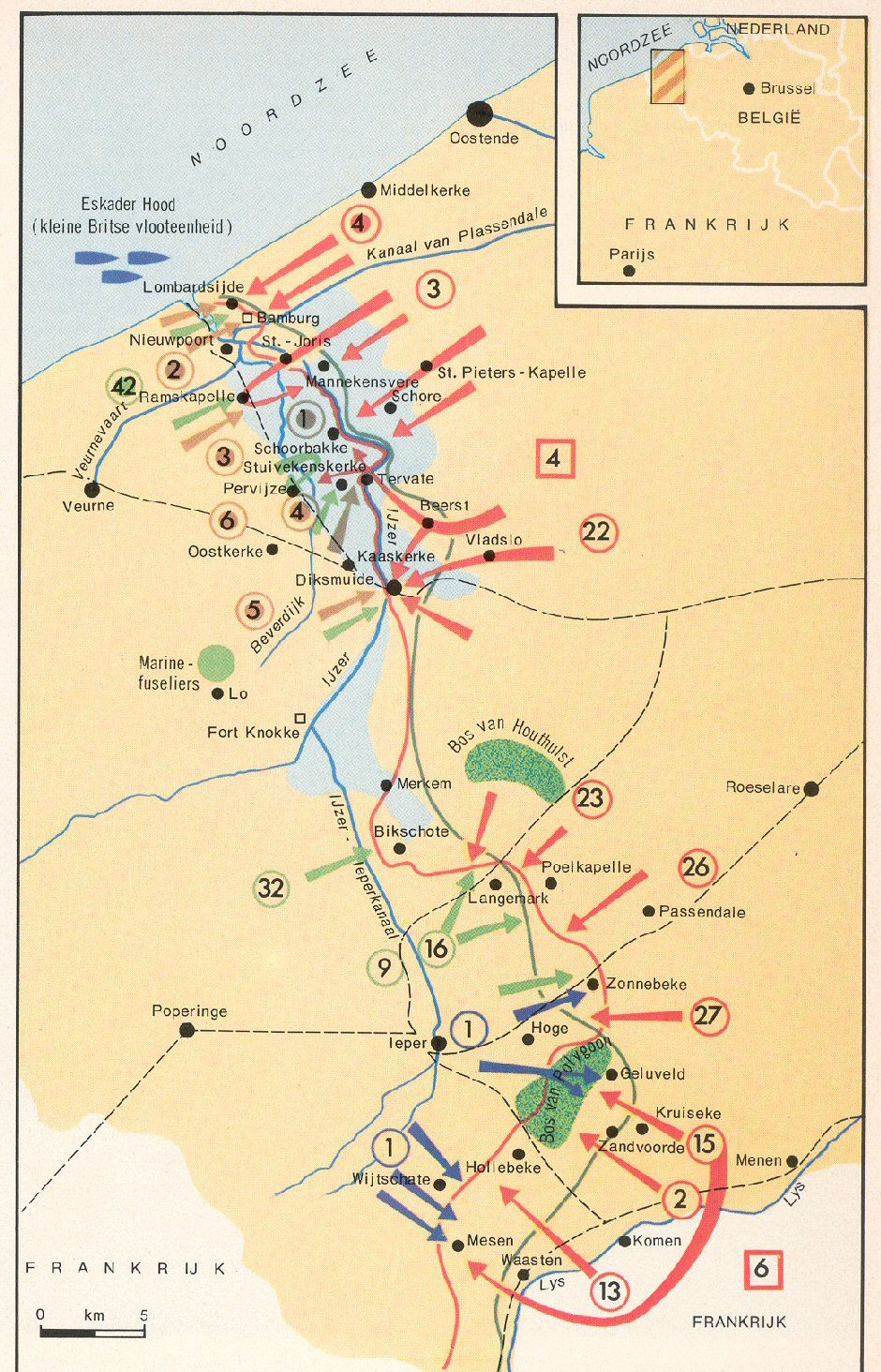
Military operations in Belgium, October 1914

The Belgian retreat continued on 11 and 12 October, covered by cavalry, cyclists and motor machine-gun sections. On 14 October, the Belgian army began to dig in along the Yser, the Sixth and Fifth divisions to the north of French territorial divisions, assembled at Boezinge (Boesinghe), then northwards along the Yser canal to the Fusiliers Marins at Diksmuide (Dixmude). The Fourth, First and Second divisions prolonged the line north, with advanced posts at Beerst, Keiem (Keyem), Schoore and Mannekensvere, about 1 mi (2 km) forward on the east bank. A bridgehead was also held near the coast around Lombartzyde and Westende, to cover Nieuwpoort (Nieuport), with the 2nd Cavalry Division in reserve. On 18 October, the French 87th and 89th Territorial divisions took over the defence of the front line south of Fort Knokke from the Sixth Division, which was moved to the Yser Front. On 21 October, the hard-pressed Belgian Army was reinforced by the French 42nd Division (Major-General Paul François Grossetti).

The Allies assembled a naval force under the British Admiral Horace Hood with three monitors, HMS Severn, Humber, Mersey and assorted craft to provide heavy artillery support to the defenders of the seaward flank. The German forces comprised the new 4th Army (Albrecht Duke of Württemberg), with the III Reserve Corps from Antwerp and four new reserve corps from Germany, along with cavalry and heavy artillery units. It moved southwards from Bruges and Ostend in the direction of the Yser river, to take the line from Nieuwpoort to Ypres (Ieper).

== Battle ==
On 16 October Diksmuide, garrisoned by Belgian and French troops (Colonel Alphonse Jacques), was attacked. Despite many casualties, the Belgians and French held the town. The press, politicians, literary figures and the military manipulated public opinion, making out that the defence of the town was strategically-important and heroic.

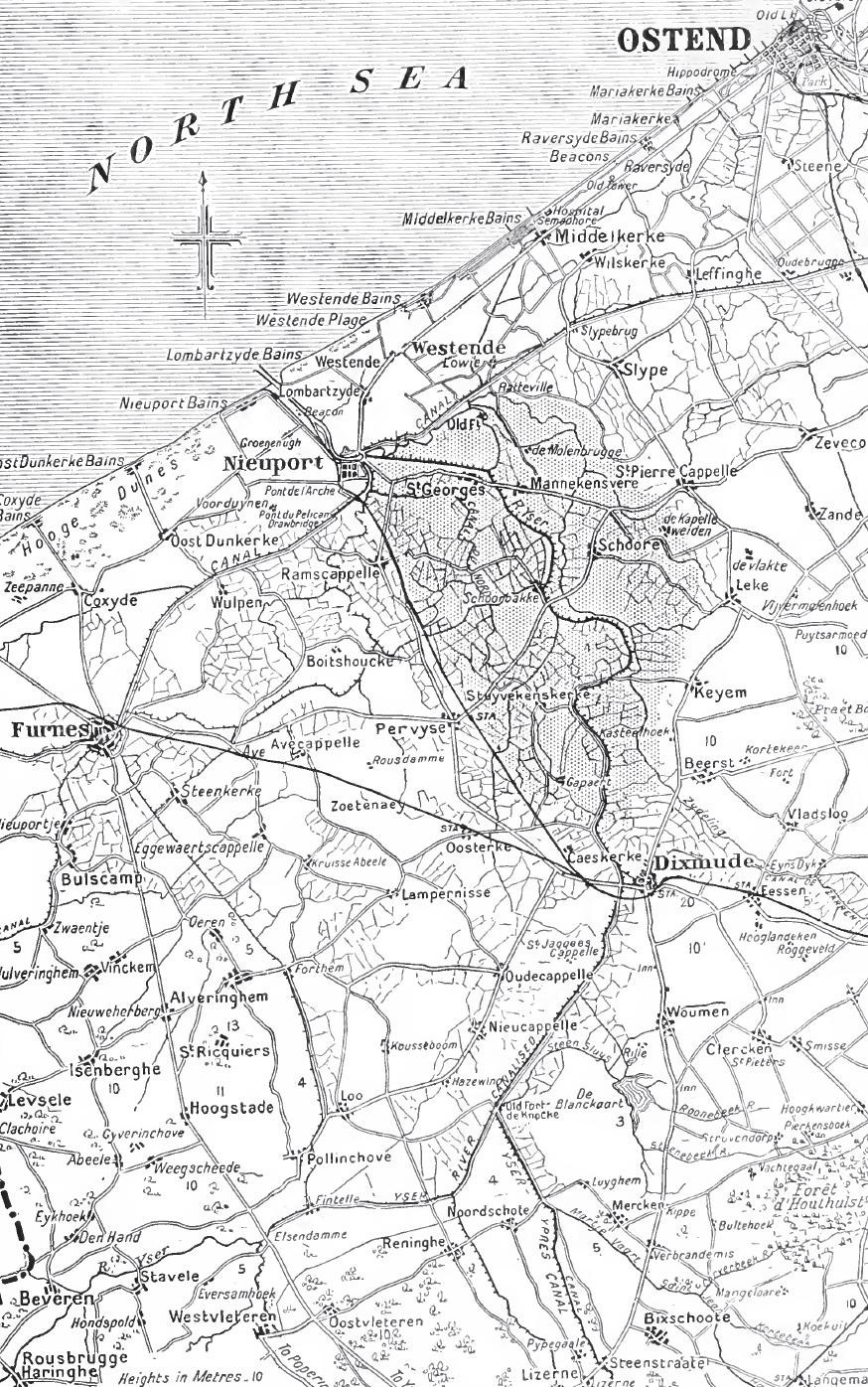
Yser inundations, 1914

On 18 October, the German offensive began and overran Allied troops from Nieuwpoort southwards to Arras. The objective was to defeat the Belgian and French armies and to deprive the British of access to Calais, Boulogne and Dunkirk. The III Reserve Corps attacked Belgian defences from Diksmuide to the sea, regardless of loss. The Germans captured advanced posts at Keiem, Schoore and part of Mannekensvere and reached the Yser, despite bombardments from the Anglo-French flotilla, which engaged German troops along the coast as far as Middelkerke. The 4th Ersatz Division was forbidden to cross the Yser at Nieuwpoort because of the shell-fire from the Allied ships.

On 21 October, the Germans established a small bridgehead on the west bank, despite a counter-attack by the French 42nd Division, which had just arrived and the last bridge was blown on 23 October. Diksmuide was constantly bombarded and attacked but the defenders managed to hold on. Grand Quartier Général, the French high command, planned to flood the land to obstruct the Germans, which would trap the Belgian army between the flood and the Germans or force them to abandon the last part of unoccupied Belgium. The plan was postponed because the Belgian army was preparing to flood the area between the Yser and its tributary canals.

On 25 October, the German pressure on the Belgians was so great that a decision was taken to inundate the Belgian front line. After an abortive attempt on 21 October, the Belgians managed to open the sluices at Nieuwpoort during the nights from 26 to 30 October, during high tides, steadily raising the water level until an impassable flooded area was created of about 1 mi (1.6 km) wide, stretching as far south as Diksmuide.

The Germans attacked again on the Yser front on 30 October, overran the Belgian second line and reached Ramskapelle and Pervijze. Belgian and French counter-attacks recovered Ramskapelle and the final attack, planned for the next day was called off when the Germans realised that the land behind them was flooding. The Germans withdrew in the night of 30/31 October. On 10 November, Diksmuide fell and the fighting continued further south until 22 November, in the First Battle of Ypres.

== Aftermath ==
=== Analysis ===
The Belgian Army and its allies had managed to hold the last corner of Belgium, ending the Race to the Sea and the period of open warfare. The front line along the Yser River became known as the Yser Front and was held by the Belgian Army until 1918. The struggle of the Belgian army to hold on to its territory during the remainder of the war and the experiences of ordinary Flemish infantrymen, led to an increase in Flemish national sentiment and the foundation of the Frontbeweging, the first party of the Flemish Movement, in 1917.

=== Casualties ===
The British official historian, James Edmonds, wrote in 1925, in the second 1914 volume of the History of the Great War, that from 18 October to 30 November 1914, between Gheluvelt and the coast, the Germans suffered an estimated 76,250 casualties. In 2010, Jack Sheldon wrote that from 18 to 30 October, the Belgian army suffered 20,000 casualties and that German casualties may have been much greater.

== See also ==
- Belgium in World War I
- German occupation of Belgium during World War I

== Bibliography ==
=== Books ===
- Amez, Benoît (2013). Vie et Survie dans les Tranchées Belges: Témoignages Inédits [Life and Survival in the Belgian Trenches: Unpublished Evidence]. Brussels: Editions Jourdan. ISBN 978-2-87466-318-5.
- Barnett, C. (2001) [1963]. The Swordbearers: Supreme Commanders in the First World War (Cassell ed.). London: Eyre & Spottiswoode. ISBN 978-0-304-35283-8.
- Barton, P.; Doyle, P.; Vandewalle, J. (2005). Beneath Flanders Fields: the Tunnellers' War, 1914–1918. Staplehurst: Spellmount. ISBN 978-0-7735-2949-6.
- Cook, B. A. (2004). Belgium: A History. New York: Peter Lang. ISBN 978-0-8204-5824-3.
- Dumoulin, M.; Gerard, E.; Van den Wijngaert, M.; Dujardin, V. (2005). Nouvelle Histoire de Belgique: 1905–1950 [New History of Belgium: 1905–1950]. Vol. II. Brussels: Éd. Complexe. ISBN 978-2-8048-0078-9.
- Doughty, R. A. (2005). Pyrrhic victory: French Strategy and Operations in the Great War. Cambridge, MA: Belknap Press. ISBN 978-0-674-01880-8.
- Edmonds, J. E. (1926). Military Operations France and Belgium, 1914: Mons, the Retreat to the Seine, the Marne and the Aisne August–October 1914. History of the Great War Based on Official Documents by Direction of the Historical Section of the Committee of Imperial Defence. Vol. I (2nd ed.). London: Macmillan. OCLC 58962523.
- Edmonds, J. E. (1925). Military Operations France and Belgium, 1914: Antwerp, La Bassée, Armentières, Messines and Ypres October–November 1914. History of the Great War Based on Official Documents by Direction of the Historical Section of the Committee of Imperial Defence. Vol. II (1st ed.). London: Macmillan. OCLC 220044986.
- Falls, C. (1959). The Great War 1914–1918. New York: Putnam. OCLC 833884503 – via Archive Foundation.
- Joffre, J. (1920) [1915]. "The Battle of the Yser". In Horne, C. F. (ed.). Great Events of the Great War. Vol. II (repr. ed.). New York: J. J. Little & Ives. OCLC 1209172. OL 15057141M.
- Schaepdrijver, Sophie de (2004). La Belgique et la première guerre mondiale [Belgium and the First World War] (2nd ed.). Brussels: Lang. ISBN 978-90-5201-215-5.
- Sheldon, J. (2010). The German Army at Ypres 1914 (1st ed.). Barnsley: Pen and Sword Military. ISBN 978-1-84884-113-0.
- Strachan, H. (2001). The First World War: To Arms. Vol. I. Oxford: OUP. ISBN 978-0-19-926191-8.
- Tyng, S. (2007) [1935]. The Campaign of the Marne 1914 (repr. Westholme ed.). New York: Longmans, Green. ISBN 978-1-59416-042-4.

=== Journals ===
- Fichou, J-C. (2010). "Les pompons rouges à Dixmude: l'envers d'une légende" [The red bobbles in Dixmude: the Birth of a Legend]. Guerres Mondiales et Conflits Contemporains (in French). IV (240). ISSN 0984-2292.

=== Websites ===
- Rickard, J. (2013). "Battle of the Yser: 18 October – 30 November 1914". Historyofwar.org.
