= Brigade de Fusiliers Marins =

Brigade des Fusiliers Marins
- Active: 7 August 1914 - November 1915
- Country: France
- Branch: French Navy; Fusiliers Marins
- Type: Brigade
- Size: 1st and 2nd Fusiliers Marins Regiment comprising six battalions
- Part of: 38th Infantry Division (France)
- Engagements: World War I; Battle of the Yser

Commanders
- Notable commanders: Pierre Alexis Ronarc'h

The Brigade des Fusiliers Marins was a unit of the French Navy which fought alongside the Belgium Army in 1914-1915 and which held their ground as they suffered heavy losses in October 1914 at Diksmuide to halt the advance of the German army and protect Dunkirk.

== Origin ==
When war was declared in August 1914, the French Navy had Fusiliers Marins on board warships who were not actively participating in the war, given that combat was primarily being conducted on land. To make use of these men, it was decided on 7 August 1914, to create a strong brigade of 6,000 men organized into two regiments which would become the 1st and 2nd Regiment of Fusiliers Marins. The command of the brigade was entrusted to Pierre Alexis Ronarc'h, recently promoted to contre-amiral (rear admiral). Its first order was to take the place of the former garrison of Paris, recently redeployed, so as to defend the capital and its outskirts.

== Organisation ==
The brigade was constituted of one headquarter staff, two regiments and one MG (machine gun) company of 15 sections. Each regiment was commanded by a Capitaine de Vaisseau and each was formed of a headquarters staff along with 3 battalions.

== Recruitment ==
In the composition of the brigade, were 700 very young junior ratings (Young volunteers barely sixteen and a half year of age), reservists of the depot at Lorient, and artificers from the Fleet. The extremely young composition astonished the Parisians.

They were joined at Paris by reinforcements hailing from the other ports: Rochefort, Brest, Cherbourg and Toulon. These reinforcements included older ratings and volunteers with nautical backgrounds, to fight on land as the naval infantry of the French Army.

== Sent to Belgium as reinforcements ==
In October 1914, the Germans in numbers threatened to annihilate Belgian defences. The brigade's mission was to leave Paris and reinforce the Belgian Army, a mission also confined to the 87th Territorial Infantry Division. The purpose was to aid the Belgian Army to deploy in France and protect the strategic port of Dunkirk.

On 2 October, the brigade was transported by train into Flanders, then made its way to Antwerp and the Belgian Army. At Ghent, the brigade came to a halt; the train tracks were cut from there on.

The Fusiliers Marins engaged in combat at Melles, Belgium on 9, 10, and 11 October to protect the retreat of the Belgian troops evacuating Antwerp. Then, the brigade went to Diksmuide, which they reached on 15 October after a long tiring march. These men, who were used to a life barefooted on ship decks at sea, were marching thirty to forty kilometres, being pursued by fifty thousand Germans.

On the following day, 16 October, while the defence line of the Fusiliers Marins had only just been put into effect, the Germans launched their first wave of attacks with artillery and infantry. Combats in Diksmuide had just begun. Opposing 6,000 Fusiliers Marins of the brigade commanded by Admiral Pierre Alexis Ronarc'h and 5,000 Belgians commanded by colonel Jean-Baptiste Meiser, were three German army reserve corps under the orders of Albrecht, Duke of Württemberg, with almost 30,000 men.

== Battle of Diksmuide ==
On 24 October, at 2100hrs, the Duke of Württemberg launched a general attack with the objective to penetrate the front in the direction of Veurne. Two columns assaulted the front at Nieuwpoort-Diksmuide, held by the Belgians, and two other columns converged on Diksmuide, after a formidable artillery preparation.

On 26 October, the Fusiliers Marins were reinforced by 2nd Mixed Colonial Regiment (2^{e} RCM). This regiment of Troupes coloniales was part of the 1st brigade of the Moroccan Division commanded by lieutenant-colonel Pelletier; it was composed of two battalions: the 3rd Senegalese Battalion of Algeria under commandant Frèrejean and the 1st Senegalese Battalion of Algeria under Commandant (rank) Brochot.

On 28 October, a decision was taken, to open the valves and flood the left bank of Yser between this river and the railway of Diksmuide at Nieuwpoort, rendering Diksmuide almost an artificial island. These floods saved the situation on Yser.

On 10 November, the defenders of Diksmuide were constrained, following intense combats which finished corps à corps down to the bayonet, to abandon the city in flames and to pass over again to the left bank.

They were tasked with defending the town for four days, yet they held the town for three weeks, while facing an opposing force of almost 50,000 men.

== Outcome ==
Losses for the defenders were significant. Three thousand men were either killed or removed from the fight: 23 officers, 37 warrant officers, 450 ratings; 52 officers, 108 warrant officers, 1,774 ratings wounded; 698 taken prisoner or missing.

Of the Senegalese Tirailleurs, only 400 riflemen remained in the Frèrejean battalion and 11, out of which one captain, of the Brochot battalion: 411 survivors out of 2,000.

On 15 November, the offensive was permanently halted.

== After the battle ==
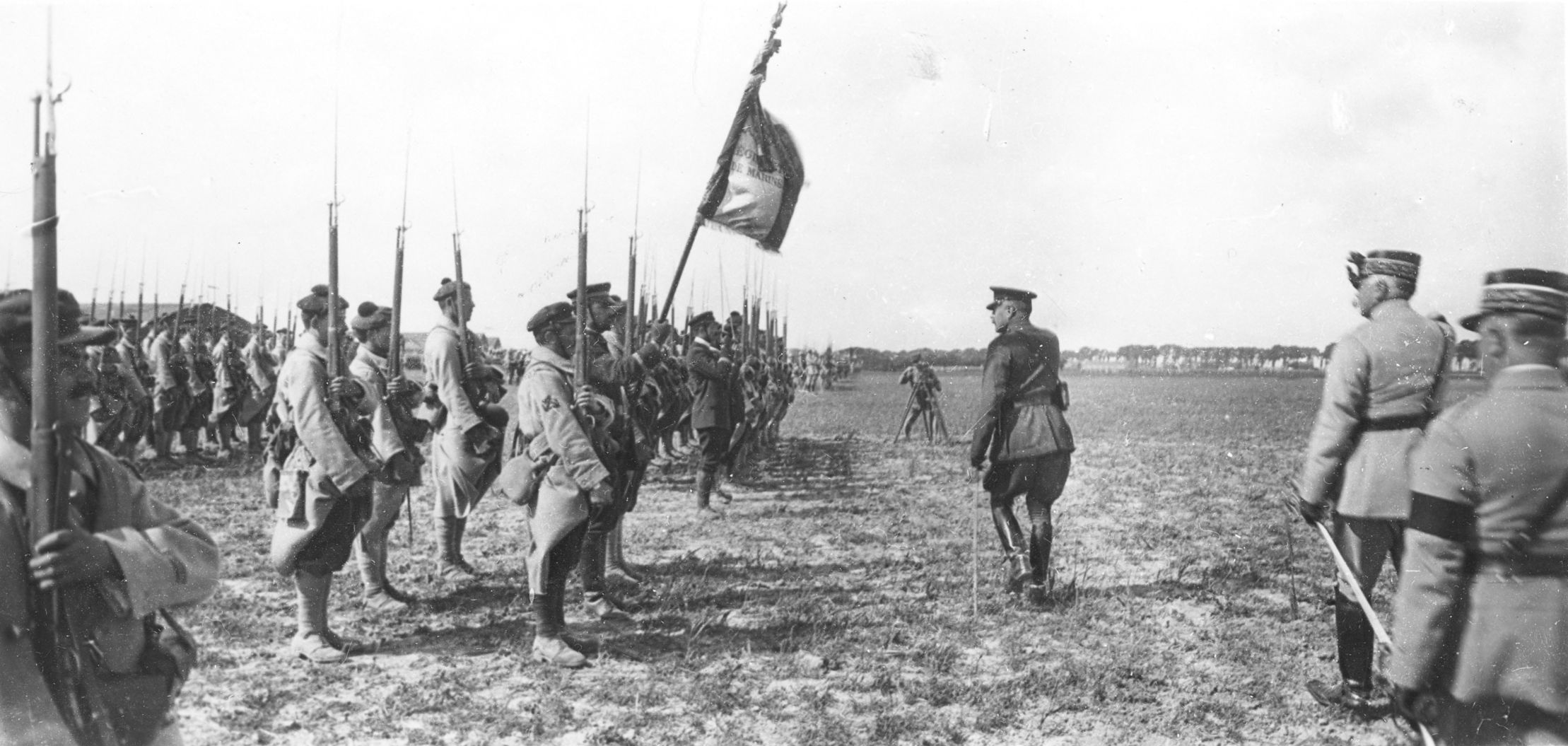
Field Marshal Douglas Haig, 1st Earl Haig saluting French Navy Fusiliers, Bergues, France,1917. The photograph shows the distinctive uniform of the Fusiliers Marines. Their badge of crossed anchors can be seen on one soldier's shoulder.

The sacrifice made by the Brigade had a significant effect in France. This unit did not have a flag. Accordingly, the survivors of the Brigade de Fusiliers Marins were assembled near Dunkirk on 11 January 1915. Raymond Poincaré, President of France, accompanied by Victor Augagneur, Minister of the Navy, bestowed on Admiral Ronarc'h the flag of the Fusiliers Marins, the duty of the Colour guard was entrusted to the 2nd Regiment.

End of January 1915, the Brigade garrisoned the Nieuwpoort sector.

From January to May 1915, the fronts in Flanders progressively stabilised until the Allied offensive in July 1917.

The Brigade became part of the 38th Infantry Division (France), where it remained until its disbandment.

== Dissolution of the brigade ==
In November 1915 in France, the French government decided to disband the Brigade de Fusiliers Marins, following the request from the French Navy who needed its personnel afloat to counteract the U-boat campaign. The flag of the Fusiliers Marins remained at the front with the remaining Fusiliers Marins battalion, supported by a combat engineer (military bridge building) field company, and with eight MG sections. The two regiments were stood down on 10 December 1915.

During the sixteen months at the front, the Brigade de Fusiliers Marins suffered the following casualties - killed, wounded or missing - 172 Officers, 346 Warrant officers, and almost 6000 Naval ratings, the equivalent of the initial strength of the brigade, the majority of whom were Bretons.

== See also ==
- Fusiliers marins
