= List of companions of the Liberation =

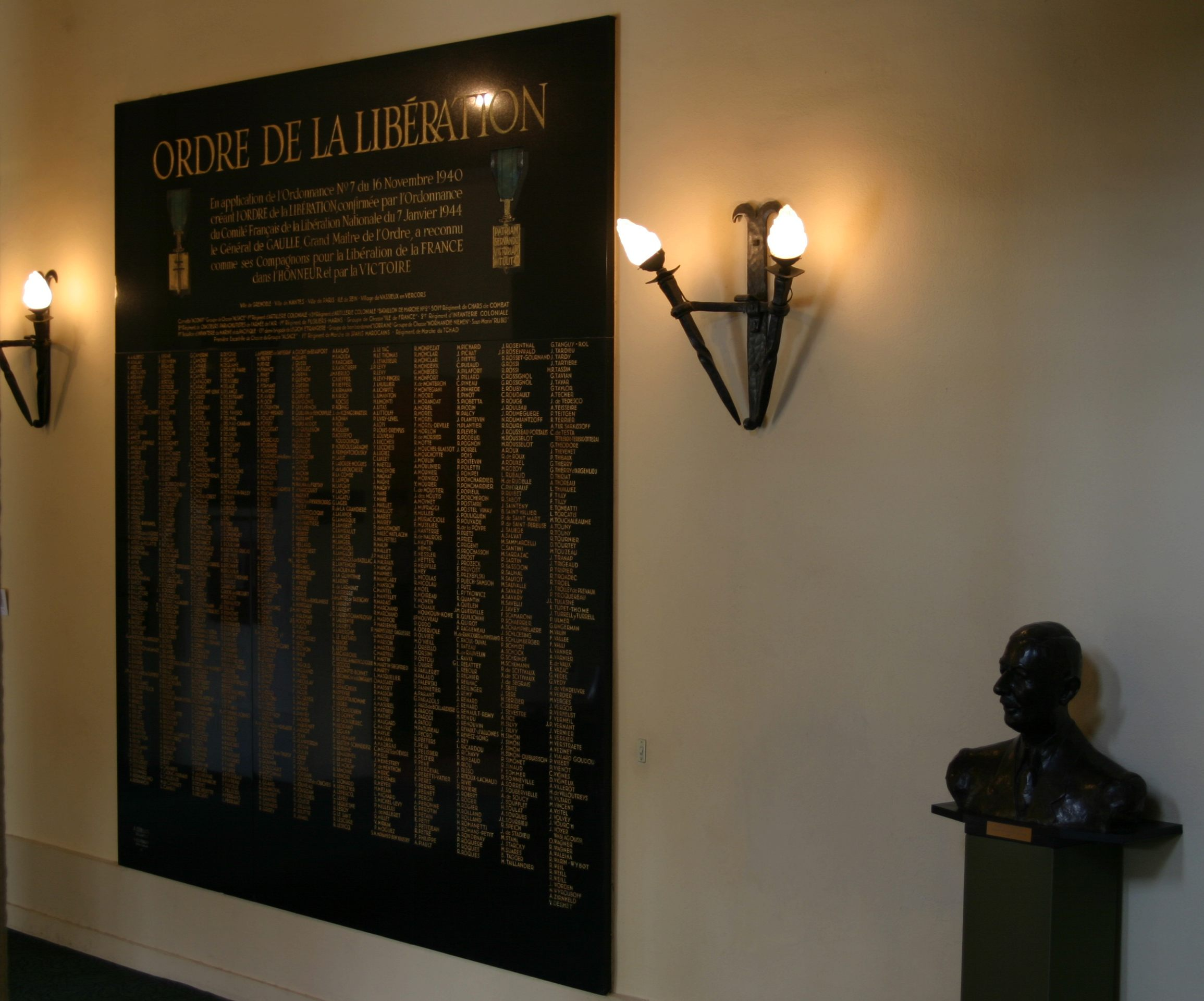
Ordre de la Libération commemorative plaque in the Musée de l'armée

This is a list of the companions of the Liberation, which consist of people, communities and military units that have been awarded the Ordre de la Libération.

1038 people, 5 cities, and 18 military units have been awarded Compagnons de la Libération. Amongst the 1038 Compagnons, 271 have been awarded posthumously, 60 were not French at the time they were awarded and six are women. The last surviving member of the order, Hubert Germain, died on 12 October 2021.

== People ==
=== A ===
- André Aalberg
- Michel Abalan
- Valentin Abeille
- José Aboulker
- Robert Abraham
- Henri Adeline
- Alain Agenet
- Edouard Ahnne
- Raymond Appert
- Marcel Albert
- Berty Albrecht
- Blaise Alexandre
- Roland Alibert de Falconnet
- Émile Allegret
- Roger Alloues
- Henri Amiel
- Dimitri Amilakvari
- René Amiot
- Hubert Amyot D'Inville
- Louis Andlauer
- Gustave André
- Roger André
- Jacques Andrieux
- Pierre Anglade
- Bernard Anquetil
- Roméo Antoniotti
- Paul Appert
- Pierre Arainty
- Paul Aribaud
- Louis Armand
- Michel Arnaud
- Paul Arnault
- Pierre Arrighi
- François Arzel
- Henri d'Astier de la Vigerie
- François d’Astier de la Vigerie
- Emmanuel d'Astier de la Vigerie
- Jean Astier de Villatte
- Pierre Aubertin
- Philippe Auboyneau
- Antoine Avinin
- Fernand Aymé
- Jean Ayral

=== B ===
- Gabriel Bablon
- René Babonneau
- Joseph Bakos
- Jean Ballarin
- André Ballatore
- Jacques Ballet
- Bernard Barberon
- Roger Barberot
- Gustave Barlot
- Raymond Basset
- Paul Batiment
- Jacques Bauche
- Guy Baucheron de Boissoudy
- René Bauden
- René Baudry
- Jacques Baumel
- Georges Bavière
- Maurice Bayrou
- Jean de Bazelaire de Ruppierre
- Jacques Beaudenom de Lamaze
- Henri Beaugé-Berubé
- Pierre Beaugrand
- Jean Bécourt-Foch
- Didier Béguin
- Louis Béguin
- Valentin Béhélo
- Mohamed Bel Hadj
- Jean Bellec
- Émile Bellet
- Louis Bénard
- Auguste Bénébig
- Henri Benevene
- Lionel Beneyton
- Pierre de Bénouville
- Raoul Béon
- Frédéric Bergamin
- Georges Bergé
- Jean-Pierre Berger
- André Bergeret
- Pierre Bernard
- Claude Bernard
- Philippe Bernardino
- Adrien Bernavon
- Lucien Berne
- Pierre Bernheim
- Lucien Bernier
- Pierre Bertaux
- Jean Bertin
- Jean Bertoli
- Antonin Betbeze
- Antoine Béthouart
- Pierre Beucler
- Georges Bidault
- François Bigo
- Pierre Billotte
- Abel Billy
- Robert Bineau
- Jacques Bingen
- François Binoche
- Roger Birot
- Antoine Bissagnet
- Arnaud Bisson
- André Blanchard
- René Blanchard
- Pierre Blanchet
- Jacques Blasquez
- Sigismond Blednicki
- Louis Blesy
- Maurice du Boisrouvray
- Alain de Boissieu
- François Bolifraud
- Émile Bollaert
- André Bollier
- Michel Bollot
- Paul Bonaldi
- Georges Bonnet
- Claude Bonnier
- Maurice Bonte
- Louis Bonvin
- François Boquet
- Henri Bordas
- Sidiki Boubakari
- Jean Bouchez
- Claude Bouchinet-Serreules
- Michel Boudier
- André Boulloche
- Henri Bouquillard
- Claude Bourdet
- Jacques Bourdis
- Henri Bourgeois
- Maurice Bourgès-Maunoury
- Pierre-Louis Bourgoin
- Pierre Bourgoin
- Augustin Bourrat
- Édouard Bourret
- Émile Bouthemy
- Léon Bouvier
- René Bouvret
- Laurent Bovis
- André Boyer
- Jacques Branet
- Gabriel Branier
- Jean Brasseur
- Raphaël Briard
- Roger Brias
- Charles Bricogne
- Martial Brigouleix
- René Briot
- Pierre Briout
- Pierre Brisdoux Galloni d'Istria
- Félix Broche
- Diego Brosset
- Pierre Brossolette
- Louis Broudin
- Amédée Brousset
- André Brunel
- Gabriel Brunet de Sairigné
- Jacques Brunschwig-Bordier
- Augusto Bruschi
- Pierre Brusson
- Paul Buffet-Beauregard
- Martial Bugeac
- Georges Buis

=== C ===
- Georges Cabanier
- Jean Cadéac d'Arbaud
- René Cailleaud
- Michel de Camaret
- Lucien Cambas
- Gustavo Camerini
- Jean-Claude Camors
- Joseph Canale
- Georges Canepa
- André Cantes
- Jean Capagory
- Michel Carage
- Roger Carcassonne-Leduc
- Jean-Claude Carrier
- Joseph Casile
- René Casparius
- René Cassin
- Jean Cassou
- Noël Castelain
- Georges Catroux
- Jean Cavaillès
- Alfred Cazaud
- Roger Ceccaldi
- Jean Cédile
- Jacques Chaban-Delmas
- Julien Chabert
- Albert Chambonnet
- Jean-Louis Chancel
- Claude Chandon
- Pol Charbonneaux
- Albert Chareyre
- Guy Charmot
- Henri Chas
- Pierre Château-Jobert
- Guy Chauliac
- Guy Chaumet
- Paul Chausse
- Albert Chavanac
- Eugène Chavant
- Guy Chavenon
- Paul Chenailler
- Camille Chevalier
- Maurice Chevance-Bertin
- Bernard Chevignard
- Pierre de Chevigné
- Gilbert Chevillot
- Geoffroy Chodron de Courcel
- Maurice Choron
- Winston Churchill
- Maurice Claisse
- Roland Claude
- Eugène Claudius-Petit
- Charles Clerc
- Charles Cliquet
- Francis-Louis Closon
- Pierre Clostermann
- Jean Clouet des Pesruches
- Jean Coggia
- Philibert Collet
- Constant Colmay
- Charles Colonna d'Istria
- Paulin Colonna d'Istria
- Jean Colonna d'Ornano
- Adrien Conus
- Roger Coquoin
- Daniel Cordier
- Jean-Marie Corlu
- Édouard Corniglion-Molinier
- Renaud de Corta]
- Louis Cortot
- Henri Cotteret
- Christian Coudray
- Hervé Coué
- Émile Coulaudon
- Jean Coupigny
- Pierre Cournarie
- Paul Courounet
- Edmond Coussieu
- Robert Cremel
- Jean Crépin
- Roger Crivelli
- René Crocq
- Irénée Cros
- Michel Cruger
- Robert Cunibil
- Camille Cunin

=== D ===
- André Dammann
- Justin Dangel
- Émile Da Rif
- Yves de Daruvar
- Edmond Debeaumarché
- Henri Debiez
- Eugène Déchelette
- Raymond Decugis
- Raymond Defosse
- Émile Degand
- Marcel Degliame
- André Déglise-Favre
- Émile Dehon
- Pierre Dejussieu-Pontcarral
- Dino Del Favero
- Maurice Delage
- Charles Delestraint
- Raymond Deleule
- André Delfau
- François Delimal
- Georges Delrieu
- Fortuné Delsaux
- Pierre Delsol
- Bernard Demolins
- Jean Demozay
- Georges James Denis
- Pierre Deshayes
- Jean Desmaisons
- Victor Desmet (1919–2018)
- Lucien Detouche
- Robert Détroyat
- Jean Devé
- André Devigny
- André Dewavrin ("Passy")
- Adolphe Diagne
- Laure Diebold
- Thadée Diffre
- Louis Dio
- Daniel Divry
- Jacques Dodelier
- Joseph Domenget
- Jan Doornik
- Idrisse Doursan
- Daniel Dreyfous-Ducas
- Jean Dreyfus
- François Drogou
- Raymond Dronne
- Henri Drouilh
- Jean Drouot-L'Hermine
- Raoul Duault
- Georges Dubois (1896–1971)
- Gaston Duché de Bricourt
- Antoine Duchêne
- Maurice Duclos
- Joseph Duhautoy-Schuffenecker
- Jean-Pierre Dulau
- François Dumont
- Roger Dumont
- Bernard Dupérier
- René Dupont
- Baptiste Dupuis
- Louis Dupuis
- Albert Durand
- Pierre Dureau
- Michel Durrmeyer
- René Duvauchelle

=== E ===
- Félix Éboué
- Hermann Eckstein
- Albert Eggenspiller
- Rudolph Eggs
- Dwight D. Eisenhower
- Constant Engels
- Jean Eon
- Juan-José Espana
- Henri Honoré d'Estienne d'Orves
- Jules Evenou
- Yves Ezanno

=== F ===
- Yves Farge
- Henry Farret
- Marceau Faucret
- Michel Faul
- Philippe Fauquet
- François Faure
- Benjamin Favreau
- Emile Fayolle
- Constantin Feldzer
- Louis Ferrant
- Joseph de Ferrières de Sauveboeuf
- Henri Fertet (1926-1943), French Resistance fighter
- Jean Fèvre
- Marcel Finance
- Louis Finite
- Pierre Finite
- Paul Flandre
- Guy Flavien
- Jacques Florentin
- Louis Flury-Hérard
- Raphaël Folliot
- Albert Fossey
- Henri Fougerat
- François Fouquat
- Claudius Four
- Pierre Fourcaud
- Michel Fourquet
- Jean Fournier
- Louis Fournier de la Barre
- Pierre Fourrier
- Yvan Franoul
- Philippe Fratacci
- Henri Frenay
- Geoffroy Frotier de Bagneux
- Henri Fruchaud
- Bernard Fuchs
- Roger Furst

=== G ===
- Pierre Gabard
- Adolphe Gaétan
- André Gallas
- Robert Galley
- Gilbert Garache
- Pierre Garbay
- François Garbit
- Roger Gardet
- Henri Garnier
- Romain Gary
- René Gatissou
- Gontran Gauthier
- Marcel Gayant
- Alain Gayet
- Jean Gemahling
- André Genet
- René Génin
- Louis Gentil
- André Geoffroy
- George VI
- André Gerberon
- Hubert Germain
- René Gervais
- Raymond Gibert-Seigneureau
- Jean Gilbert
- Xavier Gillot
- Ernest Gimpel
- Emile Ginas
- Alexandre Gins
- Noël Giorgi
- Arthur Giovoni
- Nicolas de Glos
- Louis Godefroy
- André-Jean Godin
- Joseph de Goislard de Monsabert
- Charles Gonard
- Henri Gorce-Franklin
- Jean Gosset
- Jean de Goujon de Thuisy
- William Gould
- Georges Goumin
- François Goussault
- Georges Goychman
- Toussaint Gozzi
- Albert Grand
- Gilbert Grandval
- Georges Grasset
- André Gravier
- Paul Grenier
- Alain Grout de Beaufort
- Marcel Guaffi
- Max Guedj
- Yves Guellec
- Alphonse Guéna
- Paul Guénon
- Claude Guérin
- René Gufflet
- Gaston Guigonis
- Pierre Guilhemon
- Roger Guillamet
- Maurice Guillaudot
- Jacques de Guillebon
- Paul Guillon
- Marcel Guillot
- Maxime Guillot
- Auguste Guillou
- Georges Guingouin
- Jean Guyot
- Marius Guyot

=== H ===
- Joseph Hackin
- Marie Hackin
- Maurice Halna du Fretay
- Emmanuel d’Harcourt
- Bernard Harent
- Olivier Harty de Pierrebourg
- John F. Hasey
- Arnauld Haudry de Soucy
- Pierre de Hauteclocque
- Pierre Hautefeuille
- Yves de la Hautière (Carré de Lusançay dit)
- Jacques Hazard
- Bernard Hébert
- Jacques Hébert
- Gérard Hennebert
- Mathurin Henrio
- Marcelle Henry
- Pierre-Jean Herbinger
- Georges Héritier
- Jean d'Hers
- Robert Hervé
- Yves Hervé
- Claude Hettier de Boislambert
- Alfred Heurteaux
- Jean-Marie Heyrend
- Jules Hirleman
- Georges Hugo
- François d'Humières

=== I ===
- Paul Ibos
- Albert Idohou
- Pierre Iehlé
- André Ima
- François Ingold
- Henry Ingrand
- Victor Iturria

=== J ===
- Henri Jaboulay
- André Jacob
- François Jacob
- Paul Jacquier
- Rodolphe Jaeger
- André Jamme
- Jean Jaouen
- Félix Jaquemet
- André Jarrot
- Edmond Jean
- Georges Jeanperrin
- Jean Jestin
- Marcel Jeulin
- Bertrand Jochaux du Plessis
- Jules Joire
- Paul Joly
- Paul Jonas
- Augustin Jordan
- Jacques Joubert des Ouches
- Georges Jouneau
- Paul Jourdier
- Germain Jousse
- Pierre Julitte
- Yves Jullian
- Robert Jumel

=== K ===
- André Kailao
- Maurice Kaouza
- Henri Karcher
- Jean Kerléo
- Philippe Kieffer
- Auguste Kirmann
- Robert Kaskoreff
- Imre Kocsis
- Marie Pierre Kœnig
- Jules de Koenigswarter
- Albert Kohan
- Yorgui Koli
- Marcel Kollen
- Dominique Kosseyo
- Georges Koudoukou
- Paul Koudoussaragne
- Alexandre Krementchousky

=== L ===
- Henri Labit
- François de Labouchère
- René La Combe
- Emile Laffon
- Henry Lafont
- Pierre Lafont
- Yves Lagatu
- Roger de la Grandière
- André Lalande
- Georges Lamarque
- Claude Lamirault
- Marcel Langer
- Pierre Langlois
- Xavier Langlois
- Jacques Langlois de Bazillac
- Roger Lantenois
- Jean Laquintinie
- Edgard de Larminat
- Jean de Lattre de Tassigny
- Edouard Laurent
- Jean-Claude Laurent-Champrosay
- Henri Laurentie
- Pierre Laureys
- Roger Lavenir
- André Lavergne
- Albert Lebon
- Philippe Leclerc de Hauteclocque
- Charles Le Cocq
- Jacques Lecompte-Boinet
- Guy Le Coniac de la Longrays
- Yves Le Dû
- Pierre Lefaucheux
- Marcel Lefèvre
- Paul Legentilhomme
- Yves Léger
- Charles Le Goasguen
- Pierre Le Gourierec
- Michel Legrand
- Claude Le Hénaff
- Jean Lejeune
- Paul Leistenschneider
- Jacques Lemarinel
- Jules Le Mière
- René Lemoine
- René Lenoir
- René Lepeltier
- Joseph Léonard
- Aimé Lepercq
- Claude Lepeu
- Pierre Lequesne
- Georges Le Sant
- Roger Lescure
- René Lesecq
- Joël Le Tac
- Jean Levasseur
- Jean-Pierre Lévy
- Roger Lévy
- Henri Lévy-Finger
- Jean Lhuillier
- André Lichtwitz
- Lucien Limanton
- Hugues Limonti
- Albert Litas
- Albert Littolff
- Philippe Livry-Level
- Alexandre Lofi
- Pierre Louis-Dreyfus (1908-2011)
- Edmond Louveau
- Jean Lucchesi
- Yves Lucchesi
- André Lugiez
- Charles Luizet

=== M ===
- Edmond Magendie
- Louis Magnat
- Jean Magne
- Henri Magny
- Yves Mahé
- Jacques Maillet
- Henri Maillot
- Louis Mairet
- Pierre de Maismont
- Stanislas Malec-Natlacen
- Henri Malin
- Horace Mallet
- Jean-Pierre Mallet
- André Malraux
- Stanislas Mangin
- Henri Manhès
- Henri Manigart
- Jacques Mansion
- Claude Mantel
- Henri Marais
- Robert Marchand
- Jean Maridor
- Pierre Marienne
- Philippe Marmissolle-Daguerre
- Gérard Marsault
- Paul Marson
- Albert Marteau
- Christian Martell
- François Martin
- Marc Martin-Siegfried
- Albert Marty
- Louis Masquelier
- Olivier Massart
- Raymond Massiet
- Robert Masson
- Jacques Massu
- Antoine Masurel
- Roger Mathieu
- Jacques Mathis
- Joseph Maugard
- Charles Mauric
- Michel Maurice-Bokanowski
- Roger Maylie
- André Mazana
- Alphée Maziéras
- Christian Megret de Devise
- Paul Mélis
- Jacques Menestrey
- François de Menthon
- Edouard Méric
- Pierre Messmer
- Raymond Meyer
- Paul-Hémir Mezan
- Louis Michard
- Simone Michel-Lévy
- Paul Milleliri
- Jean de Milleret
- Victor Mirkin
- Pierre Moguez
- Mohammed V
- Roger Mompezat
- Raoul Monclar
- René Mondenx
- Georges Moneger
- Henri Monfort
- Xavier de Montbron
- Fred Moore
- Yvon Morandat
- Émilienne Moreau-Evrard
- André Morel
- René Morel
- Théodose Morel
- François Morel-Deville
- Paul Morlon
- Roger Motte
- Jacques Mouchel-Blaisot
- René Mouchotte
- Jean Moulin
- André Moulinier
- André Mounier
- Mouniro
- Yves Mourier
- Léonel de Moustier
- Jean des Moutis
- André Moynet
- Jean Mufraggi
- Henri Muller
- Jules Muracciole
- Émile Muselier

=== N ===
- Jean Nanterre
- René de Naurois
- Léon Nautin
- Némir
- Edmond Nessler
- Jean Netter
- Paul Neuville
- Jean-Bernard Ney
- Louis Nicolas
- René Nicolau
- Alfred Noël
- Robert Noireau
- Lucien Nouaux
- Noukoun Kone
- Jean-Pierre Nouveau

=== O ===
- Paul Oddo
- Aloysius Odervole
- Pierre Olivier
- Marc O’Neill
- Jean Orbello
- Marcel Orsini
- Paul Ortoli
- Louis Oubre

=== P ===
- René Pailleret
- Gaston Palewski
- Pierre Pannetier
- André Parant
- Gilbert Parazols
- Jacques Pâris de Bollardière
- Alexandre Parodi
- René Parodi
- André Patou
- Joseph Paturau
- Joseph Pécro
- René Peeters
- Louis Pélissier
- Adrien Peltier
- Pierre Pène
- Joseph Perceval
- Achille Peretti
- Etelvino Perez
- Victor Perner
- Jacques Pernet
- Elie Péju
- François Péron
- Antoine Péronne
- Guy Pérotin
- Raymond Perraud
- Jacques Petitjean
- René Petre
- François Philippe
- Michel Pichard
- Olivier de Pierrebourg
- Jacques Piette
- Charles Pijeaud
- Alfred Pillafort
- Jean Pillard
- Christian Pineau
- Edmond Pinhède
- Edouard Pinot
- Stéphane Piobetta
- Hippolyte Piozin
- Jean-Charles Plantevin
- René Pleven
- Roger Podeur
- Raymond Pognon
- Jean Poirel
- René Poitevin
- Pierre Poletti
- Jean Pompei
- Dominique Ponchardier
- Pierre Ponchardier
- Edmond Popieul
- André Postel-Vinay
- Joseph Pouliquen
- Pierre Pouyade
- Roland de la Poype
- Paul Prets
- Moïse Priez
- Corentin Prigent
- Maurice Prochasson
- Georges Prost
- Jean Proszeck
- Ernest Pruvost
- Pierre Puech-Samson
- Joseph Putz
- Lazare Pytkowicz

=== Q ===
- René Quantin
- André Quelen
- Jean-Marie Querville
- Robert Quilichini
- Andre Quirot

=== R ===
- Philippe Ragueneau
- Henri de Rancourt de Mimerand
- Claude Raoul-Duval
- Pierre Rateau
- Serge Ravanel
- Laurent Ravix
- Georges-Louis Rebattet
- Louis Rebour
- David Régnier
- Eugène Reilhac
- Alfred Reilinger
- Jean Rémy
- Jacques Renard
- Gilbert Renault
- Henri Rendu
- Jacques Renouvin
- Jean-Gabriel Revault d'Allonnes
- Tibor Revesz-Long
- Jean Rey
- Louis Ricardou
- Noël Riou
- Joseph Risso
- Roger Ritoux-Lachaud
- Louis Rivié
- Paul Rivière
- Jacques Robert
- Maurice Rolland
- Henri Rol-Tanguy
- Henri Romanetti
- Henri Romans-Petit
- André Rondenay
- Paul-Jean Roquère
- Philippe Roques
- Raymond Roques
- Jean Rosenthal
- Jean-Pierre Rosenwald
- Pierre Rosset-Cournand
- Robert Rossi
- Charles Rossignol
- Georges Rossignol
- Elie Rouby
- Jacques Rouleau
- Jacques Roumeguère
- Nicolas Roumiantzoff
- Remy Roure
- Jean Rousseau-Portalis
- Antoine Rousselot
- Henri Rousselot
- André Roux
- Robert de Roux
- André Roux
- François Rozoy
- Henry de Rudelle
- Charles Rudrauf
- Pierre Ruibet
- Josef Rysavy

=== S ===
- Raymond Sabot
- Bernard Saint-Hillier
- Pierre de Saint-Mart
- Jean Sainteny
- Jules Saliège
- André Salvat
- Marcel Sammarcelli
- Charles Santini
- Maurice Sarazac
- Jean-Pierre Sartin
- Philippe Sassoon
- Robert Saunal
- Michel Sauvalle
- Henri Sautot
- Alain Savary
- Albert Savary
- Horace Savelli
- Jacques Savey
- Fred Scamaroni
- Henri Schaerrer
- Alfred de Schamphelaëre
- Jacques-Henri Schloesing
- Etienne Schlumberger
- Paul Schmidt
- André Schock
- Maurice Schumann
- Philippe de Scitivaux
- Xavier de Scitivaux
- Jacques de Segrais
- François Seité
- Henri Serizier
- Charles Serre
- Jacques Sevestre
- Adolphe Sicé
- Henri Silvy
- Jean Silvy
- Henry Simon
- Jean Simon
- Jean-Salomon Simon
- Henri Simon-Dubuisson
- Pierre Simonet
- Roger Sinaud
- François Sommer
- Pierre Sonneville
- Jean Soubervielle
- Jacques Soufflet
- Henri Soulat
- Jean-Louis Sourbieu
- Jacques de Stadieu
- Michel Stahl
- Marcel Suarès

=== T ===
- Benjamin Tagger
- Marcel Taillandier
- Joseph Tardieu
- René Tardy
- Jacques Tartière
- Pierre Tassin de Saint-Péreuse
- Gaston Tavian
- Jacques Tayar
- Georges William Taylor
- Auguste Techer
- Jean de Tedesco
- Aimé Teisseire
- Pierre-Henri Teitgen
- Teriieroo a Teriierooiterai
- Roland Terrier
- Alexandre Ter Sarkissoff
- Charles de Testa
- Gérard Théodore
- Fernand Thévenet
- Pol Thibaux
- Gabriel Thierry
- Georges Thierry d'Argenlieu
- Denis Thiriat
- Félix Tilly
- Ettore Toneatti
- Louis Torcatis
- Elie Touchaleaume
- Alfred Touny
- Roger Touny
- Raymond Tournier
- Henri Tourtet
- Martin Touzeau
- Jean Tranape
- Joseph Trigeaud
- Paul Tripier
- René Troël
- Jacques Trolley de Prévaux
- Pierre Troquereau
- Jean Tulasne
- Jaime Turrell y Turrull
- Edgard Tupët-Thomé

=== U ===
- Pierre-Paul Ulmer
- Georges Ungerman

=== V ===
- Martial Valin
- François Vallée
- François Valli
- Lucien Vanner
- André Varnier
- Etienne de Vaux
- Bohumil Vazac
- Gaston Vedel
- Gilbert Védy
- Jacques de Vendeuvre
- Michel Vergès
- Joseph Vergos
- Richard Verheust
- Henri Verdier
- Firmin Vermeil
- Jean-Pierre Vernant
- Jean Vernier
- André Verrier
- Michel Verstraete
- Adolphe Vézinet
- Jean Vialard-Goudou
- Paul Vibert
- Pierre Viénot
- Charles Vignes
- Daniel Vigneux
- Angel Villerot
- Harry de Villoutreys
- Henri Viltard
- Marcel Vincent
- Alban Vistel
- Jean Volvey
- Jean Vourc’h
- Jacques Voyer

=== W ===
- Agoussi Wabi
- Otto Wagner
- René Wagner
- Aloïzo Waleina
- René Weil
- René-Georges Weill
- Robert Weill
- James Worden
- Roger Wybot
- Nicolas Wyrouboff

=== Z ===
- André Zirnheld

== Communities ==
- Grenoble
- Île de Sein
- Nantes
- Paris
- Vassieux-en-Vercors

== Military units ==
=== French Army ===
- Bataillon de Marche n°2
- 13th Foreign Legion Demi-Brigade
- Bataillon d’Infanterie de Marine et du Pacifique
- Régiment de marche du Tchad
- 2nd Colonial Infantry Regiment
- 1st Colonial Artillery Regiment
- 1/3ème Régiment d’Artillerie Coloniale
- 1st Moroccan Spahi Regiment
- 501e Régiment de chars de combat

=== French Air Force ===
- 1ère Escadrille de Chasse
- Régiment de Chasse Normandie-Niemen
- 2ème Régiment de Chasseurs Parachutistes de l’Armée de l’Air
- Groupe de Bombardement Lorraine
- Groupe de Chasse Ile-de-France
- Groupe de Chasse Alsace

=== French Navy ===
- Sous-marin Rubis
- Corvette Aconit
- 1er Régiment de Fusiliers Marins
