= Jean-Luc Parodi =

French political scientist (1937–2022)

- Born: 8 June 1937; Paris, France
- Died: 21 January 2022 (aged 84); Paris, France
- Education: Sciences Po
- Occupation: Political scientist

Jean-Luc Parodi (8 June 1937 – 21 January 2022) was a French political scientist.

== Biography ==
Jean-Luc was the son of Alexandre Parodi, a Councillor of State and a member of the French Resistance. His uncle, René Parodi, was made a Companion of the Liberation posthumously, following his death in 1942.

Parodi studied at Sciences Po, writing a memoir under the direction of Jean Touchard and earning his degree in 1960. He also wrote a thesis on the political system of the French Fifth Republic under the direction of René Rémond. He earned a doctorate in political science in 1974.

In 1964, he became a researcher at the Centre de recherches politiques de Sciences Po (CEVIPOF), where he stayed for the entirety of his career. He served as Secretary-General of the Association française de science politique from 1980 to 1999 and directed the Revue française de science politique from 1991 to 2008. He was also heavily involved with the Institut français d'opinion publique, where he was a pioneer in the analysis of political polls. He was the first person to predict a presidential election in France in 1965 and the first to analyze municipal elections in 1983.

Parodi carried out political research at the Presses Universitaires de France alongside Olivier Duhamel, moving to Éditions du Seuil in 1993 after a nomination from Pascal Gauchon. He was an Officer of the National Order of the Legion of Honour.

He died in Paris on 21 January 2022, at the age of 84.

== Publications ==
- La Vie économique et sociale de la nation (1969)
- La Constitution de la Cinquième République (1985)
- L'Hérédité en politique (1992)
- L'Écriture de la Constitution de 1958 (1992)
