= Georges James Denis =

French aviator and Companion of the Liberation (1906–2003)

James Denis
- Born: 1 February 1906; Croix-Chapeau, Charente-Maritime, French Third Republic
- Died: 21 June 2003 (aged 97); Niort, Deux-Sèvres, French Fifth Republic
- Citizenship: France
- Occupation: Aviator
- Years active: 1925–1954
- Political party: Free France (until 1945)
- Movement: Free France
- Honours: See below

Georges James Denis (1 February 1906 – 21 June 2003) also known simply as James Denis was a French aviator, pilot, Companion of the Liberation and World War II veteran. He served in the Royal Air Force on the side of the exiled government of Free France and later the French Fourth Republic until retirement in 1954. Denis held 17 victories in aerial combat, earning him the rank of flying ace.

== Biography ==
Georges James Denis was born on 1 February 1906 in the town of Croix-Chapeau, Charente-Maritime into a farming family. He was a son of Georges Edmond Denis (1867-1928) and Marie Julia Simon (1872-1949).

He joined the French Armed Forces in 1925, later getting his certification as a fighter pilot in 1929. Denis also became an instructor for radio navigators within the French military after he had to abdicate from his initial position for health reasons.

=== World War II ===
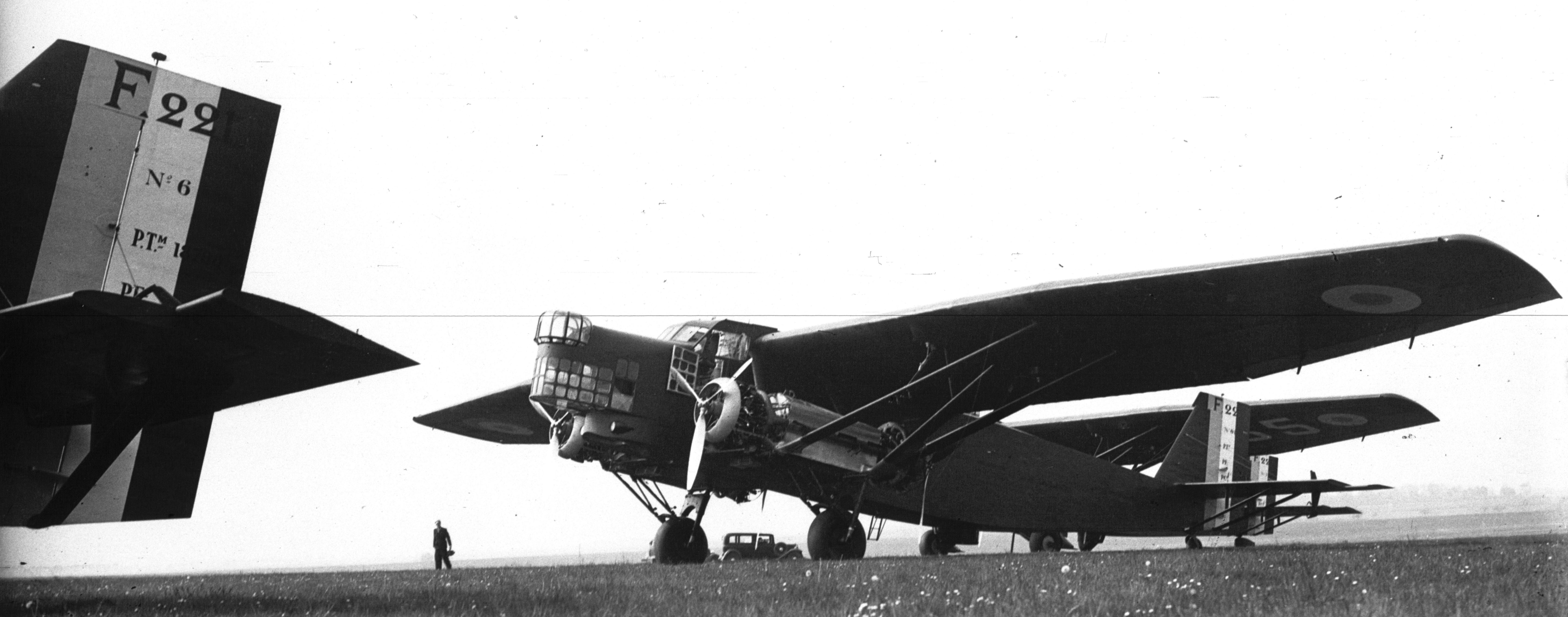
A Farman F.220 bomber, the type which was used by James Denis and a group of twenty French soldiers to escape to the British forces

During the Battle of France Denis served as an instructor at the School of Navigators and Radio Operators (École de Radio-navigants, ERN) at the Saint-Jean-d'Angély base. After the Battle of France was lost by the French to Nazi Germany, allowing the Germans to take control of France and install their client Vichy France government. This prompted Denis to escape to the United Kingdom along with twenty of his fellow soldiers in a derelict Farman F.220 monoplane bomber.

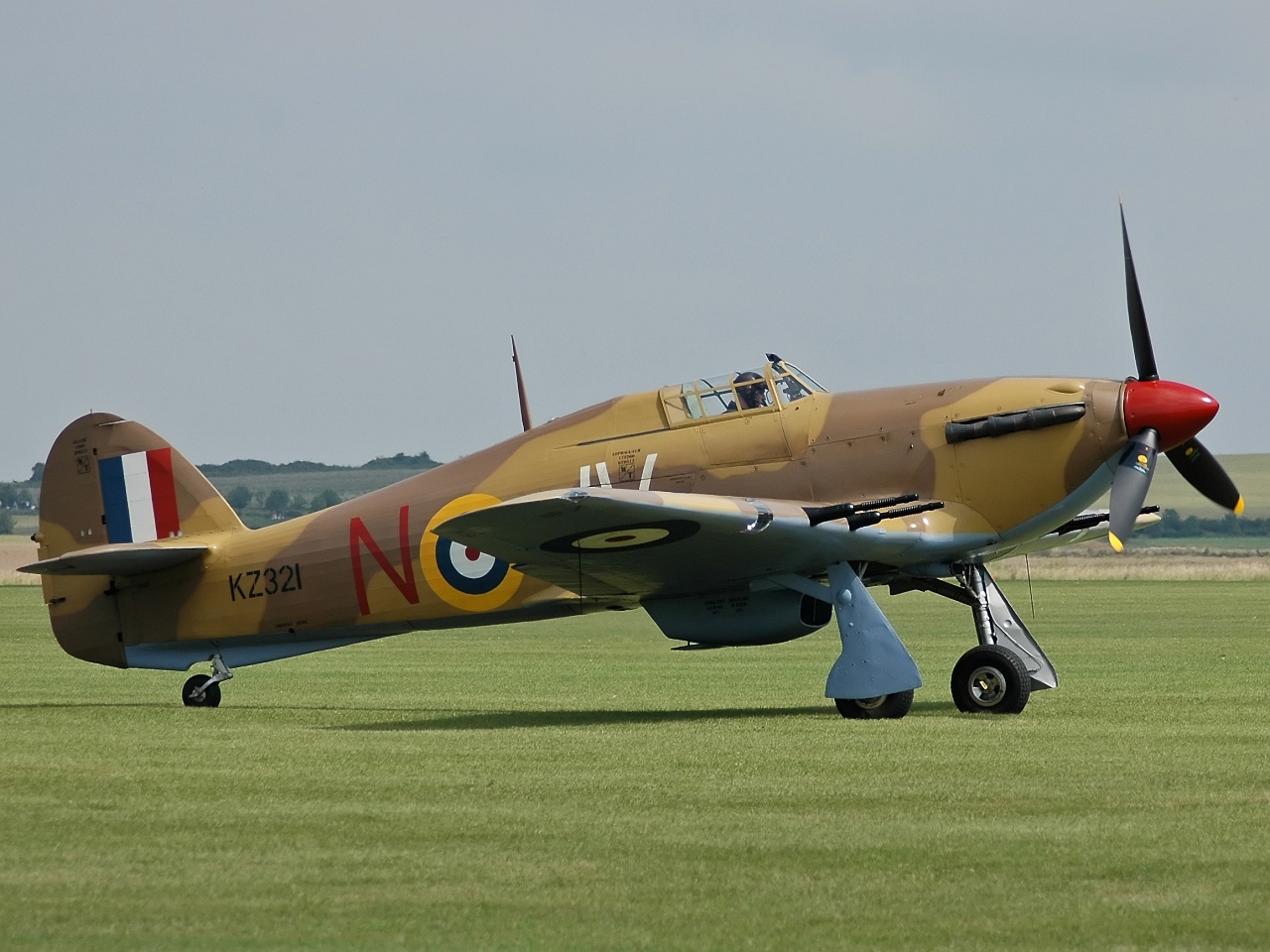
A Hawker Hurricane fighter in the desert camouflage, used in African and Middle Eastern campaigns, similar to the one James Denis piloted

In the early years of the Second World War, Denis participated on the side of the Free France against Vichy France; joining campaigns in the North African and Middle Eastern regions and mainly piloting a Hawker Hurricane. He participated in the Battle of Dakar and was also stationed in Egypt later in 1941.

In 1941, Denis defeated the German flying ace, Hans-Joachim Marseille, twice in aerial combat; the first one forcing the latter to land in Tobruk. In the second encounter, Denis himself stated that he used the technique of feigning ignorance to fool Marseille into a false sense of security which enabled him to gain the upper hand against Marseille's Messerschmitt Bf 109.

In 1942, Denis was assigned as the commander of a squadron, but was recalled back to England the year after.

=== Post-war life ===
After the Liberation of France, Denis was given a special job with the rank of major at the National Assembly in Paris where he worked as an expert on defence matters. Denis continued his service in the French army and rose to the rank of colonel. He retired in 1954.

After the retirement he worked as a director of several companies.

He died in Niort on the 21st of June, 2003 at the age of 97.

== Legacy ==
Throughout his career as a fighter pilot for the Allies, Denis scored a total of 17 aerial victories, hence making him one of the flying aces of World War II.

=== Honours ===
Georges James Denis was awarded the following honours throughout his lifetime:

- Commandeur de la Légion d'Honneur
- Order of Liberation
- Médaille Militaire
- Croix de Guerre
- Distinguished Flying Cross (United Kingdom)
- Air Medal (United States)
- Commander of the Order of George I (Greece)
- Knight of the Order of the White Eagle (Yugoslavia)
- Commander of the Order of Ouissam Alaouite (Morocco)

=== Recognition ===
Denis' name was used for the 2021 class of officers of the École de l'air et de l'espace.

== See also ==
- Hans-Joachim Marseille
- List of Companions of the Liberation
