= Jean Crépin =

French military officer (1908–1996)

- Born: September 1, 1908; Bernaville, France
- Died: May 4, 1996 (aged 87); Achères-la-Forêt, France
- Military career
- Allegiance: (French Third Republic) France; Free French Forces
- Branch: French Army; French Liberation Army
- Service years: 1928 – 1967
- Rank: Army general
- Unit: 2nd Armored Division
- Conflicts: World War II; First Indochina War; Algerian War
- Awards: Commander of the Légion d'honneur (Grand Cross); Compagnon de la Libération; Croix de la Valeur militaire Silver Star

Jean Crépin (1 September 1908 – 4 May 1996) was a French Army officer during World War II, the First Indochina War and the Algerian War. A lifelong Gaullist, he played a decisive role in many conflicts of the 20th century. He is also credited for being the driving force behind the development of the Exocet missiles and other weaponry.

After his retirement from the army in 1967 he became CEO of a aerospace manufacturer Nord Aviation. In 1970 he was Vice president of SNIAS (later Aérospatiale) and president of Euromissile. Crépin died in May 1996.

== See also ==
- Lists of Légion d'honneur recipients
- List of companions of the Liberation
