= Hans-Joachim Marseille =

German fighter pilot (1919–1942)

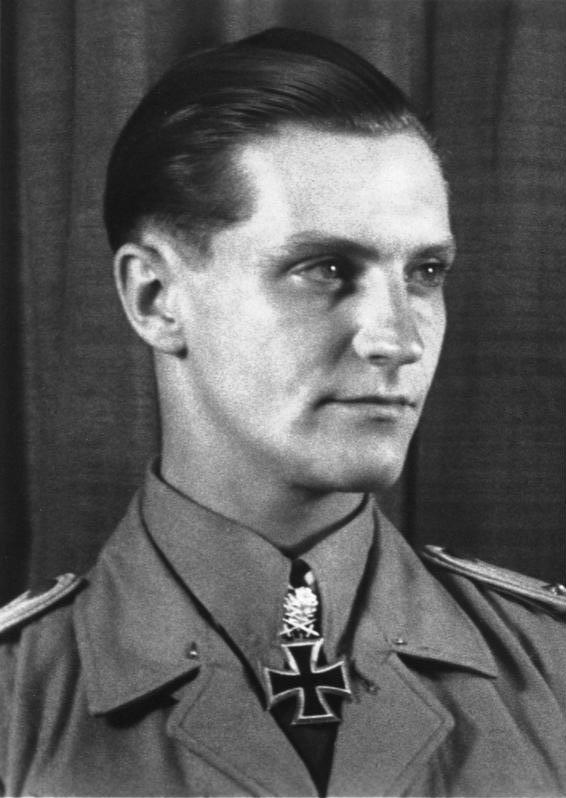
- Portrait of Marseille mid-1942
- Born: 13 December 1919; Berlin, Weimar Republic
- Died: 30 September 1942 (aged 22) near Sidi Abdel Rahman, Egypt
- Burial place: Heroes Cemetery in Derna; Memorial Gardens at Tobruk (reinterred)
- Military career
- Allegiance: Nazi Germany
- Branch: Luftwaffe
- Service years: 1938–1942
- Rank: Hauptmann (Captain)
- Nickname: Stern von Afrika (Star of Africa) to the Germans
- Units: LG 2, JG 52 and JG 27
- Commands: 3./JG 27
- Conflicts: See battles: World War II; Battle of Britain; Balkans Campaign; North African Campaign; Western Desert Campaign †
- Awards: Knight's Cross of the Iron Cross with Oak Leaves, Swords and Diamonds; Gold Medal of Military Valor

Hans-Joachim Marseille (German pronunciation: [hans ˈjoːaxɪm maʁˈsɛːj]; 13 December 1919 – 30 September 1942) was a German Luftwaffe fighter pilot and flying ace during World War II. He is noted for his aerial battles during the North African Campaign and his bohemian lifestyle. One of the most successful fighter pilots, he was nicknamed the "Star of Africa". Marseille claimed all but seven of his 158 victories against the British Commonwealth's Desert Air Force over North Africa, flying the Messerschmitt Bf 109 fighter for his entire combat career. No other pilot claimed as many Western Allied aircraft as Marseille.

Marseille, of French Huguenot ancestry, joined the Luftwaffe in 1938. At the age of 20, he graduated from one of the Luftwaffe's fighter pilot schools just in time to participate in the Battle of Britain, without notable success. A charming person, he had such a busy nightlife that sometimes he was too tired to be allowed to fly the next morning. As a result of poor discipline, he was transferred to Jagdgeschwader 27 (Fighter Wing 27, JG 27), which relocated to North Africa in April 1941.

Under the guidance of his new commander, who recognised the latent potential in the young officer, Marseille quickly developed his abilities as a fighter pilot. He reached the zenith of his fighter pilot career on 1 September 1942, when during the course of three combat sorties he claimed 17 enemy fighters shot down, earning him the Ritterkreuz mit Eichenlaub, Schwertern und Brillanten (Knight's Cross with Oak Leaves, Swords, and Diamonds). Only 29 days later, Marseille was killed in a flying accident, when he was forced to abandon his fighter due to engine failure. After he exited the smoke-filled cockpit, Marseille's chest struck the vertical stabiliser of his aircraft. The blow either killed him instantly or incapacitated him so that he was unable to open his parachute.

== Early life and career ==
Hans-Joachim "Jochen" Walter Rudolf Siegfried Marseille was born to Charlotte (maiden name: Charlotte Marie Johanna Pauline Gertrud Riemer) and Hauptmann Siegfried Georg Martin Marseille, a family with paternal French ancestry, in Berlin-Charlottenburg on 13 December 1919. (Note: Birth certificate Nr. 696, Charlottenburg, dated 15 December 1919, d.o.b. 13 December at 11:45 pm. Berliner Strasse 164.) As a child, he was physically weak, and he nearly died from a serious case of influenza. His father was an Army officer during World War I, and later left the armed forces to join the Berlin police force.

When Marseille was still a young child his parents divorced and his mother subsequently married a police official named Reuter. Marseille initially assumed the name of his stepfather at school, a matter he had a difficult time accepting, but reverted to using his father's name of Marseille in adulthood.

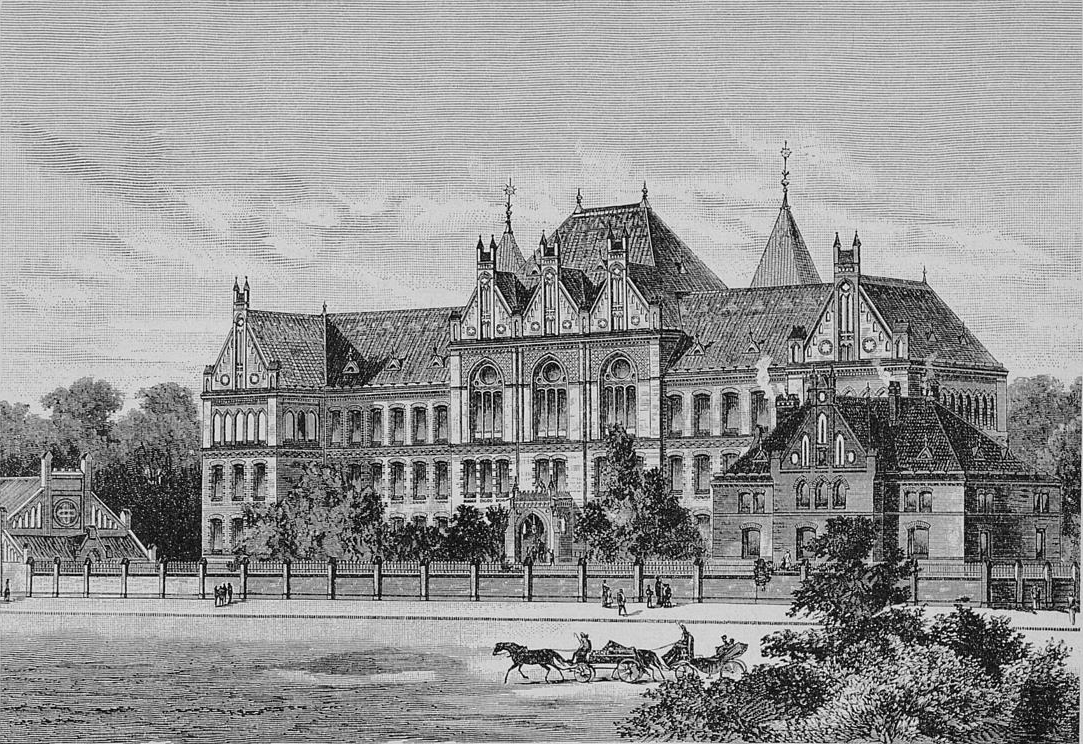
Marseille attended the Prinz-Heinrichs-Gymnasium

Marseille had a difficult relationship with his natural father, whom he refused to visit in Hamburg for some time after the divorce. Eventually, he attempted a reconciliation with his father, who introduced him to the nightlife that initially hampered his military career during his early years in the Luftwaffe. The rapprochement with his father did not last and he did not see him again.

Hans-Joachim also had an older sister, Ingeborg. While on sick leave in Athens at the end of December 1941, he was summoned to Berlin by a telegram from his mother. Upon arriving home, he learned his sister had been killed by a jealous lover while living in Vienna. Hans-Joachim reportedly never recovered emotionally from this blow.

Marseille attended a Volksschule in Berlin (1926–1930), and from the age of 10, the Prinz-Heinrichs-Gymnasium, a secondary school that prepares students for higher education at a university, in Berlin-Schöneberg (1930–1938). Between April and September 1938, he served in the Reich Labour Service.

Marseille joined the Luftwaffe on 7 November 1938 as an officer candidate and received his basic training in Quedlinburg in the Harz region. His lack of discipline gave him a reputation as a rebel, which plagued him early on in his Luftwaffe career. On 1 March 1939 Marseille was transferred to the Luftkriegsschule 4 (LKS 4—air war school) near Fürstenfeldbruck. Among his classmates was Werner Schröer.

Marseille completed his training at a Fighter Pilot School in Vienna to which he was posted on 1 November 1939. One of his instructors was the Austro-Hungarian World War I ace Julius Arigi. Marseille graduated with an outstanding evaluation on 18 July 1940 and was assigned to Ergänzungsjagdgruppe Merseburg, stationed at the airport in Merseburg-West.

Marseille's unit was assigned to air defence duty over the Leuna plant from the outbreak of war until the fall of France. On 10 August 1940 he was assigned to the Instructional Squadron 2, based in Calais-Marck, to begin operations against Britain. He again received an outstanding evaluation, this time by commander Herbert Ihlefeld.

== World War II ==
=== Battle of Britain ===
In his first dogfight over England on 24 August 1940, Marseille engaged in a four-minute battle with a skilled opponent while flying Messerschmitt Bf 109 E-3 Werknummer 3579. (Note: Marseille's first combat victory is uncertain. Sources conflict over the aircraft type citing it as a Hawker Hurricane or Supermarine Spitfire.) He defeated his opponent by pulling up into a tight chandelle to gain an altitude advantage before diving and firing. The British fighter was struck in the engine, pitched over and dived into the English Channel. This was Marseille's first victory.

Marseille was then engaged from above by more Allied fighters. By pushing his aircraft into a steep dive, then pulling up metres above the water, Marseille escaped from the machine gun fire of his opponents: "skipping away over the waves, I made a clean break. No one followed me and I returned to Leeuwarden [sic—Marseille was based near Calais, not Leeuwarden]."

The act was not praised by his unit. Marseille was reprimanded when it emerged he had abandoned his wingman, and Staffel to engage the opponent alone. In so doing, Marseille had violated a basic rule of air combat. Reportedly, Marseille did not take any pleasure in this victory and found it difficult to accept the realities of aerial combat.

While returning from a bomber-escort mission on 23 September 1940 flying Bf 109 E-7 Werknummer 5094, his engine failed 19 kilometres (10 nautical miles) off Cap Gris Nez after combat damage sustained over Dover. Pilot Officer George Bennions from 41 Squadron may have shot Marseille down. According to another source, Werknummer 5094 was destroyed in this engagement by Robert Stanford Tuck, who had pursued a Bf 109 to that location and whose pilot was rescued by a Heinkel He 59 naval aircraft. Marseille is the only German airman known to have been rescued by a He 59 on that day and in that location. Tuck's official claim was for a Bf 109 destroyed off Cap Gris Nez at 09:45—the only pilot to submit a claim in that location.

Although Marseille tried to radio his position, he bailed out over the sea. He paddled around in the water for three hours before being rescued by the float plane based at Schellingwoude. Exhausted and suffering from exposure, he was sent to a field hospital.

When he returned to duty, he received a stern rebuke from his commander, Herbert Ihlefeld. In engaging Bennions, or Tuck, Marseille had abandoned his leader Staffelkapitän Adolf Buhl, who was shot down and killed. During his rebuke, his commander tore up Marseille's flight evaluations. Other pilots also voiced their dissatisfaction concerning Marseille. Because of his alienation of other pilots and his arrogant and unapologetic nature, Ihlefeld eventually dismissed Marseille from LG 2.

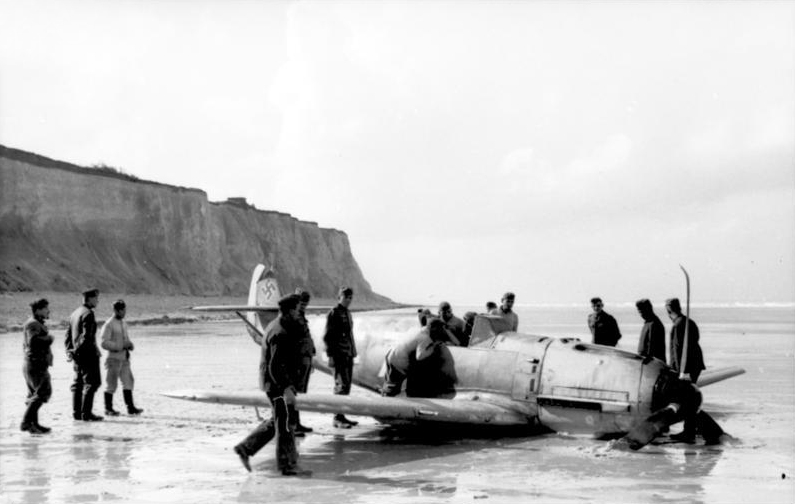
Marseille claimed his 7th aerial victory on 28 September 1940 but had to crash land near Théville due to engine failure. Bf 109 E-7, Werknummer 4091

A different account recalled how Marseille once ignored an order to turn back from a fight when outnumbered by two to one, but seeing an Allied aircraft closing on his wing leader, Marseille broke formation and shot the attacking aircraft down. Expecting congratulations when he landed, his commander was critical of his actions, and Marseille received three days of confinement for failing to carry out an order. Days later, Marseille was passed over for promotion and was now the sole Fähnrich in the Geschwader. This was a humiliation for him, suspecting that his abilities were being suppressed so the squadron leaders could take all the glory in the air.

Shortly afterwards, in early October 1940, after having claimed seven aerial victories all of them while flying with I.(Jagd)/LG 2 Marseille was transferred to 4. Staffel of Jagdgeschwader 52, (Note: For an explanation of the meaning of Luftwaffe unit designation see Luftwaffe organisation.) flying alongside the likes of Johannes Steinhoff and Gerhard Barkhorn. He wrote off four aircraft as a result of operations during this period. (Note: One Bf 109 E, Werknummer 3579, which it is claimed he crash-landed, has been recovered, restored, and painted in the colours of "White 14", an aircraft with which he was associated.)

On 9 December, Oberleutnant Rudolf Resch confined Marseille to his room for five days for calling a fellow pilot a "goofy pig" (dußlige Sau). As punishment for "insubordination"—rumoured to be his penchant for American jazz music, womanising and an overt "playboy" lifestyle—and inability to fly as a wingman, Steinhoff transferred Marseille to Jagdgeschwader 27 on 24 December 1940. Steinhoff later recalled:

"Marseille was extremely handsome. He was a very gifted pilot, but he was unreliable. He had girlfriends everywhere, and they kept him so busy that he was sometimes so worn out that he had to be grounded. His sometime irresponsible way of conducting his duties was the main reason I fired him. But he had irresistible charm."

His new Gruppenkommandeur, Eduard Neumann, later recalled, "His hair was too long and he brought with him a list of disciplinary punishments as long as your arm. He was tempestuous, temperamental and unruly. Thirty years later, he would have been called a playboy." Nevertheless, Neumann quickly recognised Marseille's potential as a pilot. He stated in an interview: "Marseille could only be one of two, either a disciplinary problem or a great fighter pilot."

On 3 December 1940, I. Gruppe of Jagdgeschwader 27 had been withdrawn from the English Channel and had relocated to Döberitz located approximately 10 kilometres (6.2 miles) west of Staaken. There, the pilots were sent on home leave, returning in January 1941. In February, the Gruppe began preparations for Operation Marita, the German invasion of Greece while the ground elements of the Gruppe began their relocation to Tripoli in North Africa, arriving there on 18 March. There, the ground crew began preparations for the air elements to arrive at the designated airfield at Ayn al-Ġazāla. In parallel, the air elements of I. Gruppe relocated to Munich-Riem Airfield in early March. There, the Gruppe received refurbished Bf 109 E-7 fighter aircraft. The aircraft had been equipped with a sand-filter on the front of the supercharger intake which made the aircraft more suitable for deployment in North Africa. On 4 April, the Gruppe was ordered to move to Graz Airfield for Operation Marita. German forces launched the attack on 6 April. The orders for I. Gruppe that day were to attack and destroy the Yugoslavian air defenses in the area of Laibach, present-day Ljubljana in Slovenia.

=== Arrival in North Africa ===
Marseille's unit briefly saw action during the invasion of Yugoslavia, deployed to Zagreb on 10 April 1941, before transferring to Africa. On 20 April on his flight from Tripoli to his front airstrip, Marseille's Bf 109 E-7 (Werknummer 1259) developed engine trouble and he had to make a forced landing in the desert short of his destination. His squadron departed the scene after they had ensured that he had got down safely. Marseille continued his journey, first hitchhiking on an Italian truck, then, finding this too slow, he tried his luck at an airstrip, but in vain. Finally, he made his way to the General in charge of a supply depot on the main route to the front and convinced him that he should be available for operations the next day. Marseille's character appealed to the General and he put at his disposal his own Opel Admiral, complete with chauffeur. "You can pay me back by getting fifty victories, Marseille!" were his parting words. He caught up with his squadron on 21 April.

Marseille scored two more victories on 23 and 28 April, his first in the North African Campaign. However, on 23 April, Marseille himself was shot down during his third sortie of that day by Sous-Lieutenant James Denis, a Free French pilot with No. 73 Squadron RAF (8.5 victories), flying a Hawker Hurricane. Marseille's Bf 109 E-7 (Werknummer 5160) received almost 30 hits in the cockpit area, and three or four shattered the canopy. Since Marseille was leaning forward, the rounds missed him by inches. Marseille managed to crash-land his fighter near Tobruk.

Denis shot down Marseille again just a month later, on 21 May 1941. Marseille engaged Denis, but overshot his target. A dogfight ensued, in which Denis once again bested Marseille. His Bf 109 E-7 (Werknummer 1567) came down in the vicinity of Tobruk behind German lines.

In a postwar account, Denis wrote that he waited for Marseille to close on him while he feigned ignorance, then skidded [side slipped], forcing the faster German to overshoot. Marseille was lucky, as bullets passed both in front of his face and behind his head; 30 hits were counted after Marseille crash landed.

In between the battles with Denis, Marseille downed a Bristol Blenheim on 28 April. Blenheim T2429, from No. 45 Squadron RAF, piloted by Pilot Officer B. C. de G. Allan, crashed killing all five men aboard. Jan Yindrich, a Polish Army soldier, witnessed the attack: "when a Blenheim came roaring down over our heads at about 50 feet, there was a terrific rattle of machine gun fire and at first I thought the Blenheim had made a mistake and was firing at us or choosing an awkward spot to clear his guns. Bullets whistled around, so we dived into the slit trench. A Messerschmitt, hot on the tail of the Blenheim, was responsible for the bullets. The Blenheim roared down the wadi, out to sea, trying to escape from the Messerschmitt, but the Messerschmitt was too close. The Blenheim fell out of the sky and crashed into the sea. The plane disappeared completely not leaving a trace. The Messerschmitt banked and flew inland again."

Neumann (Geschwaderkommodore as of 10 June 1942) encouraged Marseille to self-train to improve his abilities. By this time, he had crashed or damaged another four Bf 109 E aircraft, including an aircraft he was ferrying on 23 April 1941. Marseille's kill rate was low, and he went from June to August without a victory. He was further frustrated after damage forced him to land on two occasions: once on 14 June 1941 and again after he was hit by ground fire over Tobruk and was forced to land blind.

His tactic of diving into opposing formations often found him under fire from all directions, resulting in his aircraft frequently being damaged beyond repair; consequently, Neumann grew impatient with him. Marseille persisted, and created a unique self-training programme for himself, both physical and tactical, which resulted not only in outstanding situational awareness, marksmanship and confident control of the aircraft, but also in a unique attack tactic that preferred a high-angle deflection shooting attack and shooting at the target's front from the side, instead of the common method of chasing an aircraft and shooting at it directly from behind. Marseille often practised these tactics on the way back from missions with his comrades and became known as a master of deflection shooting.

As Marseille began to claim Allied aircraft regularly, on occasion he personally looked after the welfare of the pilot and other Allied airmen he had downed, driving out to remote crash sites to rescue them. On 13 September 1941, Marseille shot down Pat Byers of No. 451 Squadron, Royal Australian Air Force. Marseille flew to Byers' airfield and dropped a note informing the Australians of his condition and treatment. He returned several days later with second note telling of Byers' death. Marseille repeated these sorties after being warned by Neumann that Göring had forbidden any more flights of this kind.

After the war, Marseille's JG 27 comrade Werner Schröer stated that Marseille attempted these gestures as "penance" for a group that "loved shooting down aircraft" but not killing a man; "we tried to separate the two. Marseille allowed us that escape, our penance I suppose." (Note: Marseille's trip to the airfield was witnessed by Byers' squadron-mate Flight Lt. Geoffrey Morley-Mower, DFC, AFC (who became an academic postwar) who said "his greatest deeds, only revealed by the patient work of scholars and the accident of my own involvement as an eye-witness, were almost private and purely compassionate.")

Finally, on 24 September 1941, his self-training came to fruition, with his first multiple victory sortie, claiming four Hurricanes of No. 1 Squadron, South African Air Force (SAAF). These victories represented his 19th through 23rd victory. In late October, I. Gruppe was reequipped with the Bf 109 F-4/trop. To retain operation status, 1. and 3. Staffel left North Africa on 22 October while 2. Staffel stayed. In Italy they handed over their Bf 109 E variants and continued the journey back home by train. The pilots were sent on a short home leave before returning to Ayn al-Ġazāla in early December. By mid December, he had reached 25 victories and was awarded the German Cross in Gold (Deutsches Kreuz in Gold). Marseille became known amongst his peers for downing or damaging multiple enemy aircraft in a sortie.

=== The "Star of Africa" ===
"Marseille was the unrivalled virtuoso among the fighter pilots of World War 2. His achievements had previously been regarded as impossible and they were never excelled by anyone after his death."

— Adolf Galland, General der Jagdflieger

Marseille always strove to improve his abilities. He worked to strengthen his legs and abdominal muscles to help him tolerate the extreme g forces of air combat. Marseille also drank an abnormal amount of milk and shunned sunglasses, in the belief that doing so would improve his eyesight.

To counter German fighter attacks, the Allied pilots flew "Lufbery circles", in which each aircraft's tail was covered by the friendly aircraft behind. The tactic was effective, as an enemy pilot attacking this formation could find himself constantly in the sights of opposing pilots.

Marseille nonetheless often dived at high speed into the middle of these defensive formations from either above or below, executing a tight turn and firing a two-second deflection shot to destroy an enemy aircraft. Marseille's successes had begun to become readily apparent by early 1942. He claimed his 37th through 40th victories on 8 February 1942 and 41st through 44th victories four days later, which earned him the Knight's Cross of the Iron Cross (Ritterkreuz des Eisernen Kreuzes) that same month for 46 victories.

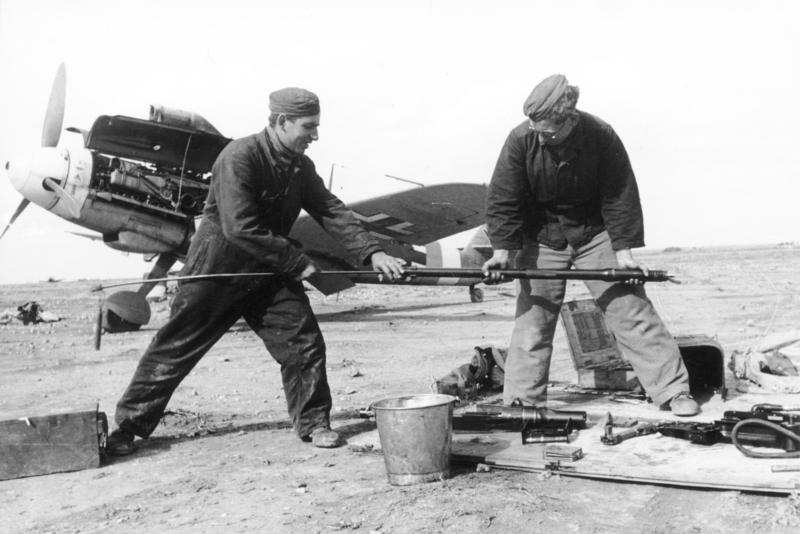
Two of Marseille's service men, cleaning an aircraft cannon in front of "Yellow 14" W.Nr. 8673.

Marseille attacked under conditions many considered unfavourable, but his marksmanship allowed him to make an approach fast enough to escape the return fire of the two aircraft flying on either flank of the target. Marseille's excellent eyesight made it possible for him to spot the opponent before he was spotted, allowing him to take the appropriate action and manoeuvre into position for an attack. He was also credited with outstanding situational awareness.

In combat, Marseille's unorthodox methods led him to operate in a small leader/wingman unit, which he believed to be the safest and most effective way of fighting in the high-visibility conditions of the North African skies. Marseille worked alone in combat, keeping his wingman at a safe distance so he would not fire on him in error or collide with him.

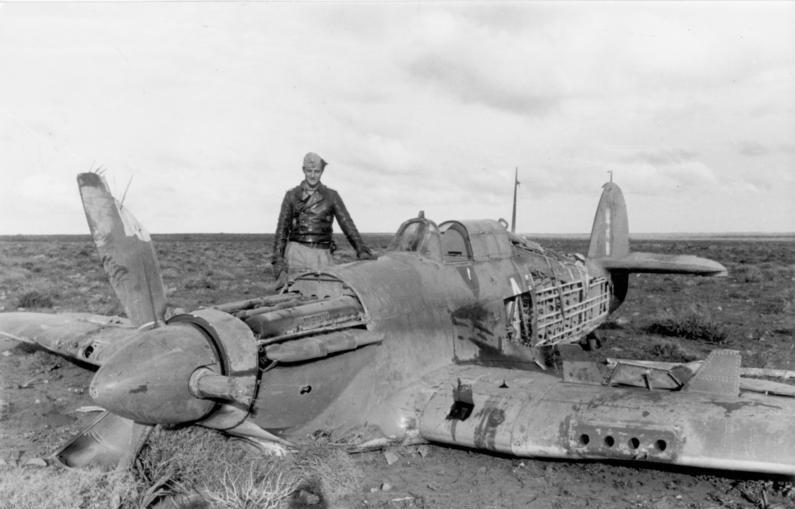
Hans-Joachim Marseille standing next to one of his aerial victories, a Hurricane Mk IIB, possibly of No. 213 Squadron RAF, February 1942. There may be sufficient remains on the code to identify it as a No. 274 Squadron RAF aircraft.

In a dogfight, particularly when attacking Allied aircraft in a Lufbery circle, Marseille would often favour dramatically reducing the throttle and even lowering the flaps to reduce speed and shorten his turn radius, rather than the standard procedure of using full throttle throughout. Emil Clade said that none of the other pilots could do this effectively, preferring instead to dive on single opponents at speed so as to escape if anything went wrong. Clade said of Marseille's tactics:

Marseille developed his own special tactics, which differed significantly from the methods of most other pilots. (When attacking a Lufbery circle) he had to fly very slowly. He even took it to the point where he had to operate his landing flaps as not to fall down, because, of course he had to fly his curve (turns) more tightly than the upper defensive circle. He and his fighter were one unit, and he was in command of that aircraft like no-one else.

Friedrich Körner, an ace with 36 victories, also recognised this as unique: "Shooting in a curve (deflection shooting) is the most difficult thing a pilot can do. The enemy flies in a defensive circle, that means they are already lying in a curve and the attacking fighter has to fly into this defensive circle. By pulling his aircraft right around, his curve radius must be smaller, but if he does that, his target disappears in most cases below his wings. So he cannot see it anymore and has to proceed simply by instinct." The attack was carried out at close-range. Marseille dived from above, climbed underneath an opponent, fired as the enemy aircraft disappeared under his own, and then used the energy from the dive to climb and repeat the process.

His success as a fighter pilot also led to promotions and more responsibility as an officer. 1 May 1942 saw him receive an unusually early promotion to Oberleutnant followed by appointment to Staffelkapitän of 3./JG 27 on 10 June 1942, succeeding Oberleutnant Gerhard Homuth, who took command of I./JG 27.

In a conversation with his friend Hans-Arnold Stahlschmidt, Marseille commented on his style, and his idea of air-to-air combat:

I often experience combat as it should be. I see myself in the middle of a British swarm, firing from every position and never getting caught. Our aircraft are basic elements, Stahlschmidt, which have got to be mastered. You've got to be able to shoot from any position. From left or right turns, out of a roll, on your back, whenever. Only this way can you develop your own particular tactics. Attack tactics, that the enemy simply cannot anticipate during the course of the battle – a series of unpredictable movements and actions, never the same, always stemming from the situation at hand. Only then can you plunge into the middle of an enemy swarm and blow it up from the inside.

"Telling Marseille that he was grounded was like telling a small child that it could not go out and play. He sometimes acted like one too."

— Werner Schröer

Marseille had a narrow escape on 13 May 1942, when his Bf 109 was damaged during a dogfight with 12 Curtiss Kittyhawks of No. 3 Squadron RAAF, southeast of Ayn al-Ġazāla and over the Gulf of Bomba ("Gazala Bay"). With a wingman, Marseille bounced the Kittyhawks. After he downed one of the Australian pilots, Flying Officer Graham Pace in AL172, Marseille's Bf 109 took hits in the oil tank and propeller, likely from Flying Officer Geoff Chinchen, who reported damaging one of the Messerschmitts. Marseille managed to shoot down another Kittyhawk, Sergeant Colin McDiarmid; AK855, before nursing his overheating aircraft back to base. The repairs to Marseille's Bf 109 took two days. The aerial victories were recorded as numbers 57 and 58.

On 26 May 1942, Generaloberst Erwin Rommel launched Operation Theseus, also referred to as the Battle of Gazala and the Battle of Bir Hakeim. Four days later, on 30 May, Marseille performed another mercy mission after witnessing his 65th victory—Pilot Officer Graham George Buckland of No. 250 Squadron RAF—striking the tailplane of his fighter and falling to his death when the parachute did not open. After landing he drove out to the crash site. The P-40 had landed over Allied lines but they found the dead pilot within German territory. Marseille marked his grave, collected his papers and verified his identity, then flew to Buckland's airfield to deliver a letter of regret.

His attack method to break up formations, which he perfected, resulted in a high proportion of victories, and in rapid, multiple victories per attack. On 3 June 1942, Marseille attacked a formation of 16 Curtiss P-40 fighters and shot down six aircraft of No. 5 Squadron SAAF, five of them in six minutes, including three aces: Robin Pare (six victories), Cecil Golding (6.5 victories) and Andre Botha (five victories). Botha crash-landed his damaged fighter. This success inflated his score further, recording his 70th to 75th victories. Marseille was awarded the Knight's Cross of the Iron Cross with Oak Leaves (Ritterkreuz des Eisernen Kreuzes mit Eichenlaub) on 6 June 1942. His wingman Rainer Pöttgen, nicknamed Fliegendes Zählwerk (the "Flying Counting Machine"), said of this fight:

All the enemy were shot down by Marseille in a turning dogfight. As soon as he shot, he needed only to glance at the enemy plane. His pattern [of gunfire] began at the front, the engine's nose, and consistently ended in the cockpit. How he was able to do this not even he could explain. With every dogfight he would throttle back as far as possible; this enabled him to fly tighter turns. His expenditure of ammunition in this air battle was 360 rounds (60 per aircraft shot down)

Schröer placed Marseille's methods into context: "He was the most amazing and ingenious combat pilot I ever saw. He was also very lucky on many occasions. He thought nothing of jumping into a fight outnumbered ten to one, often alone, with us trying to catch up to him. He violated every cardinal rule of fighter combat. He abandoned all the rules."

On 17 June 1942, Marseille claimed his 100th aerial victory. He was the 11th Luftwaffe pilot to achieve this. Marseille then returned to Germany for two months' leave and the following day was awarded the Knight's Cross of the Iron Cross with Oak Leaves and Swords (Ritterkreuz des Eisernen Kreuzes mit Eichenlaub mit Schwertern). The presentation was made by Adolf Hitler at the Führerhauptquartier (Führer Headquarters) at Rastenburg on 28 June 1942.

On 6 August, he began his journey back to North Africa accompanied by his fiancée Hanne-Lies Küpper. On 13 August, he met Benito Mussolini in Rome and was presented with the highest Italian military award for bravery, the Gold Medal of Military Valor (Medaglia d'Oro al Valor Militare). While in Italy Marseille disappeared for some time, prompting the German authorities to compile a missing persons report, submitted by the Gestapo head in Rome, Herbert Kappler. He was finally located. According to rumours he had run off with an Italian girl and was eventually persuaded to return to his unit. Unusually, nothing was ever said about the incident and no repercussions were visited upon Marseille for this indiscretion.

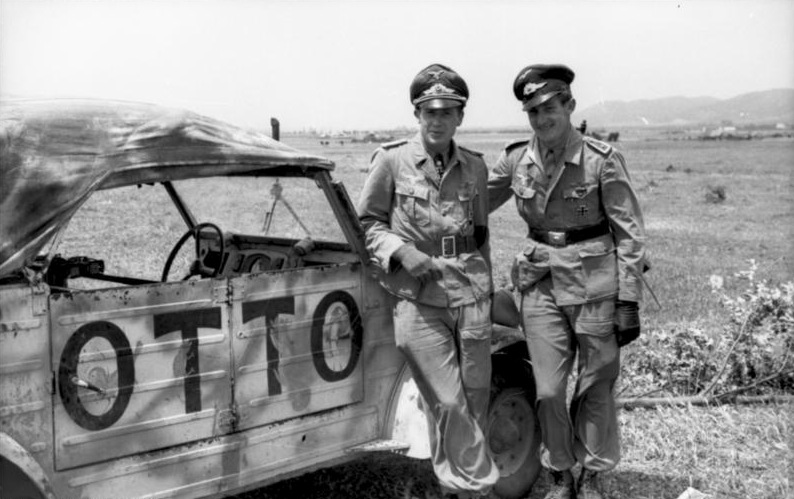
Leutnant Ernst-Wilhelm Reinert (left) and Feldwebel Maximilian Volke (right) stand next to the kübelwagen of Hans-Joachim Marseille, which he had named "Otto", 1942.

Leaving his fiancée in Rome, Marseille returned to combat duties on 23 August. 1 September 1942 was Marseille's most successful day, claiming to destroy 17 Allied aircraft (nos. 105–121), and claim 54 victories for the whole of September, his most productive month. The 17 aircraft claimed included eight in 10 minutes; for this he was presented with a Volkswagen Kübelwagen by a Regia Aeronautica squadron, on which his Italian comrades had painted "Otto" (Italian for 'eight').

This was the most aircraft from Western Allied air forces shot down by a single pilot in one day. Only three pilots would ever match this score, and only one pilot surpassed it; Emil Lang, on 4 November 1943, scored 18 fighters of the Soviet Air Force on the Eastern Front. The post-war analysis shows that the actual results of the day were probably eight to nine destroyed by Marseille with three or four more damaged.

On 3 September 1942, Marseille claimed six victories (nos. 127–132) but was hit by fire from the British-Canadian ace James Francis Edwards. Der Adler, a biweekly propaganda magazine published by the Luftwaffe, also reported his actions in volume 14 of 1942. Marseille was made famous through propaganda that treated fighter pilots as superstars and continued to do so after his death. He regularly signed postcards with his image. Aside from Der Adler, his exploits were published in Berliner Illustrirte Zeitung and Die Wehrmacht.

Three days later Edwards likely killed Günter Steinhausen, a friend of Marseille. The next day, 7 September 1942, another close friend, Hans-Arnold Stahlschmidt, was posted missing in action. These personal losses weighed heavily on Marseille's mind, along with his family tragedy. It was noted he barely spoke and became more morose in the last weeks of his life. The strain of combat also induced consistent sleepwalking at night and other symptoms that could be construed as posttraumatic stress disorder. Marseille never remembered these events. Marseille flew Bf 109 E-7 aircraft and Bf 109 F-4/Z aircraft.

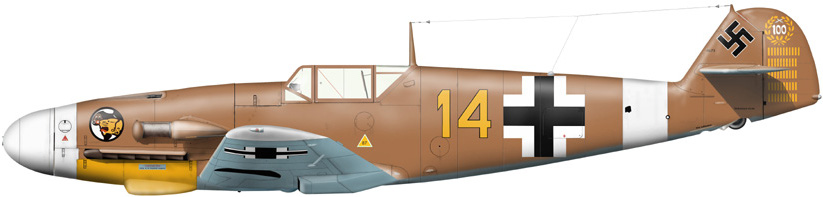
Messerschmitt Bf 109 F-4/trop, W.Nr. 8673 – 3./JG 27 – Hauptmann Hans-Joachim Marseille in September 1942

Marseille continued scoring multiple victories throughout September, including seven on 15 September (nos. 145–151). Between 16 and 25 September, Marseille failed to increase his score due to a fractured arm, sustained in a forced landing soon after the 15 September mission. As a result, he had been forbidden to fly by Eduard Neumann.

The same day, Marseille borrowed the Macchi C.202 '96–10' of the Italian ace Tenente Emanuele Annoni, from 96a Squadriglia, 9° Gruppo, 4° Stormo, based at Fouka, for a test flight. The one-off flight ended in a wheels-up landing. Marseille accidentally switched the engine off, as the throttle control in Italian aircraft operated in the opposite direction to that of the German aircraft.

Marseille had nearly surpassed his friend Hans-Arnold Stahlschmidt's score of 59 victories in just five weeks. However, the massive materiel superiority of the Allies meant the strain placed on the outnumbered German pilots was now severe. At this time, the strength of German fighter units was 112 (65 serviceable) aircraft against the British muster of some 800 machines. Marseille was becoming physically exhausted by the frenetic pace of combat. After his last combat on 26 September, Marseille was reportedly on the verge of collapse after a 15-minute battle with a formation of Spitfires, during which he scored his seventh victory of that day.

Of particular note was Marseille's 158th claim. After landing in the afternoon of 26 September 1942, he was physically exhausted. Several accounts allude to his Squadron members being visibly shocked at Marseille's physical state. Marseille, according to his own post-battle accounts, had been engaged by a Spitfire pilot in an intense dogfight that began at high altitude and descended to low level. Marseille recounted how both he and his opponent strove to get onto the tail of the other. Both succeeded and fired but each time the pursued managed to turn the table on his attacker.

With only 15 minutes of fuel remaining, he climbed into the sun. The RAF fighter followed and was caught in the glare. Marseille executed a tight turn and roll, fired from 100 m (330 ft) range. The Spitfire caught fire and shed a wing. It crashed into the ground with the pilot still inside. Marseille wrote, "That was the toughest adversary I have ever had. His turns were fabulous... I thought it would be my last fight". The pilot and his unit remain unidentified. According to Shores, Massimello and Guest, Marseille had probably engaged in combat with six Spitfires of No. 145 Squadron who reported no losses that day.

=== Death ===
The two missions of 26 September 1942 were flown in Bf 109 G-2/trop, in one of which Marseille had shot down seven Allied aircraft. The first six of these machines were to replace the Gruppe's Bf 109 Fs. All had been allocated to Marseille's 3. Staffel. Marseille had previously ignored orders to use these new aircraft because of its high engine failure rate, but on the orders of Generalfeldmarschall Albert Kesselring, Marseille reluctantly obeyed. One of these machines, WK-Nr. 14256 (Daimler-Benz DB 605 A-1 engine), was the final aircraft Marseille flew.

Over the next three days Marseille's Staffel was rested and taken off flying duties. On 28 September, Marseille received a telephone call from Generalfeldmarschall Erwin Rommel asking to return with him to Berlin. Hitler was to make a speech at the Berlin Sportpalast on 30 September and Rommel and Marseille were to attend. Marseille rejected this offer, stating that he was needed at the front and had already taken three months' vacation that year. Marseille also said he wanted to take leave at Christmas to marry his fiancée Hanne-Lies Küpper.

On 30 September 1942, Hauptmann Marseille was leading his Staffel on a Stuka escort mission covering the withdrawal of the group and relieving the outward escort, III./Jagdgeschwader 53 (JG 53), which had been deployed to support JG 27 in Africa. Marseille's flight was vectored onto Allied aircraft in the vicinity, but the opponent withdrew and did not take up combat. Marseille vectored the heading and height of the formation to Neumann, who directed III./JG 27 to engage. Marseille heard 8./JG 27 leader Werner Schröer claim a Spitfire over the radio at 10:30.

While returning to base, his new Messerschmitt Bf 109 G-2/trop's cockpit began to fill with smoke. Blinded, he was guided back to German lines by his wingmen, Jost Schlang and Lt Rainer Pöttgen. Upon reaching friendly lines, "Yellow 14" had lost power and was drifting lower and lower. Pöttgen called out after about 10 minutes that they had reached the White Mosque of Sidi Abdel Rahman, and were thus within friendly lines. At this point, Marseille deemed his aircraft no longer flyable and decided to bail out, his last words to his comrades being "I've got to get out now, I can't stand it any longer".

Eduard Neumann was personally directing the mission from the command post:

I was at the command post and listening to the radio communication between the pilots. I realised immediately something serious had happened; I knew they were still in flight and that they were trying to bring Marseille over the lines into our territory and that his aircraft was emitting a lot of smoke.

Crash site

His Staffel, which had been flying a tight formation around him, peeled away to give him the necessary room to manoeuvre. Marseille rolled his aircraft onto its back, the standard procedure for a bailout, but due to the smoke and slight disorientation, he failed to notice that the aircraft had entered a steep dive at an angle of 70–80 degrees and was now travelling at a considerably faster speed (about 640 km/h (400 mph)). He worked his way out of the cockpit only to be carried backwards by the slipstream.

The left side of his chest struck the vertical stabiliser of his fighter, which either killed him instantly or rendered him unconscious and unable to deploy his parachute. He fell almost vertically, hitting the desert floor 7 kilometres (4.3 mi) south of Sidi Abdel Rahman. A gaping 40 cm (16 in) hole had been made in his parachute and the canopy spilt out. After recovering the body, the parachute release handle was still on "safe," suggesting Marseille had not attempted to open it. Whilst the body was checked, a regimental doctor noted Marseille's wristwatch had stopped at exactly 11:42 am. The doctor was the first to reach the crash site, having been stationed just to the rear of the forward mine defences. He had also witnessed Marseille's fatal fall. The autopsy report stated:

"The pilot lay on his stomach as if asleep. His arms were hidden beneath his body. As I came closer, I saw a pool of blood that had issued from the side of his crushed skull; brain matter was exposed. I then noticed the awful wound above the hip. With certainty, this could not have come from the fall. The pilot must have been slammed into the airplane when bailing out. I carefully turned the dead pilot over onto his back. opened the zipper of his flight jacket, saw the Knight's Cross with Oak Leaves and Swords (Marseille never actually received the Diamonds personally) and I knew immediately who this was. The paybook also told me. I glanced at the dead man's watch. It had stopped at 11:42."

Oberleutnant Ludwig Franzisket collected the body from the desert. Marseille lay in state in the Staffel sick bay, his comrades coming to pay their respects throughout the day. Marseille's funeral took place on 1 October 1942 at the Heroes Cemetery in Derna with Generalfeldmarschall Albert Kesselring and Eduard Neumann delivering a eulogy. Marseille was succeeded by Oberleutnant Jost Schlang as Staffelkapitän of 3. Staffel.

The wreckage of Marseille's aircraft on 30 September 1942; the vehicle in the background marks the spot where Marseille landed.

An enquiry into the crash was hastily set up. The commission's report concluded that the crash was caused by damage to the differential gear, which caused an oil leak. Then a number of teeth broke off the spur wheel and ignited the oil. Sabotage or human error was ruled out. The aircraft, W. Nr. 14256, was ferried to the unit via Bari, Italy. The mission that ended in its destruction was its first mission.

Schland and Pöttgen's statements led Neuman to conclude there had been no fire and that a glycol leak was responsible for the engine failure. He ruled out the existence of a fire, for he did not believe Marseille could have spoken for nine minutes without fatigue in smoke caused by a fire.

JG 27 was moved out of Africa for about a month because of the impact Marseille's death had on morale. The deaths of two other German aces, Günter Steinhausen and Marseille's friend Hans-Arnold Stahlschmidt, just three weeks earlier reduced spirits to an all-time low. One biographer suggests these consequences were instigated by a failure in the command style of Marseille, although it was not entirely within his control. The more success Marseille had, the more his staffel relied on him to carry the greater share of aerial victories claimed by the unit. So his death, when it came, was something which JG 27 had seemingly not prepared for.

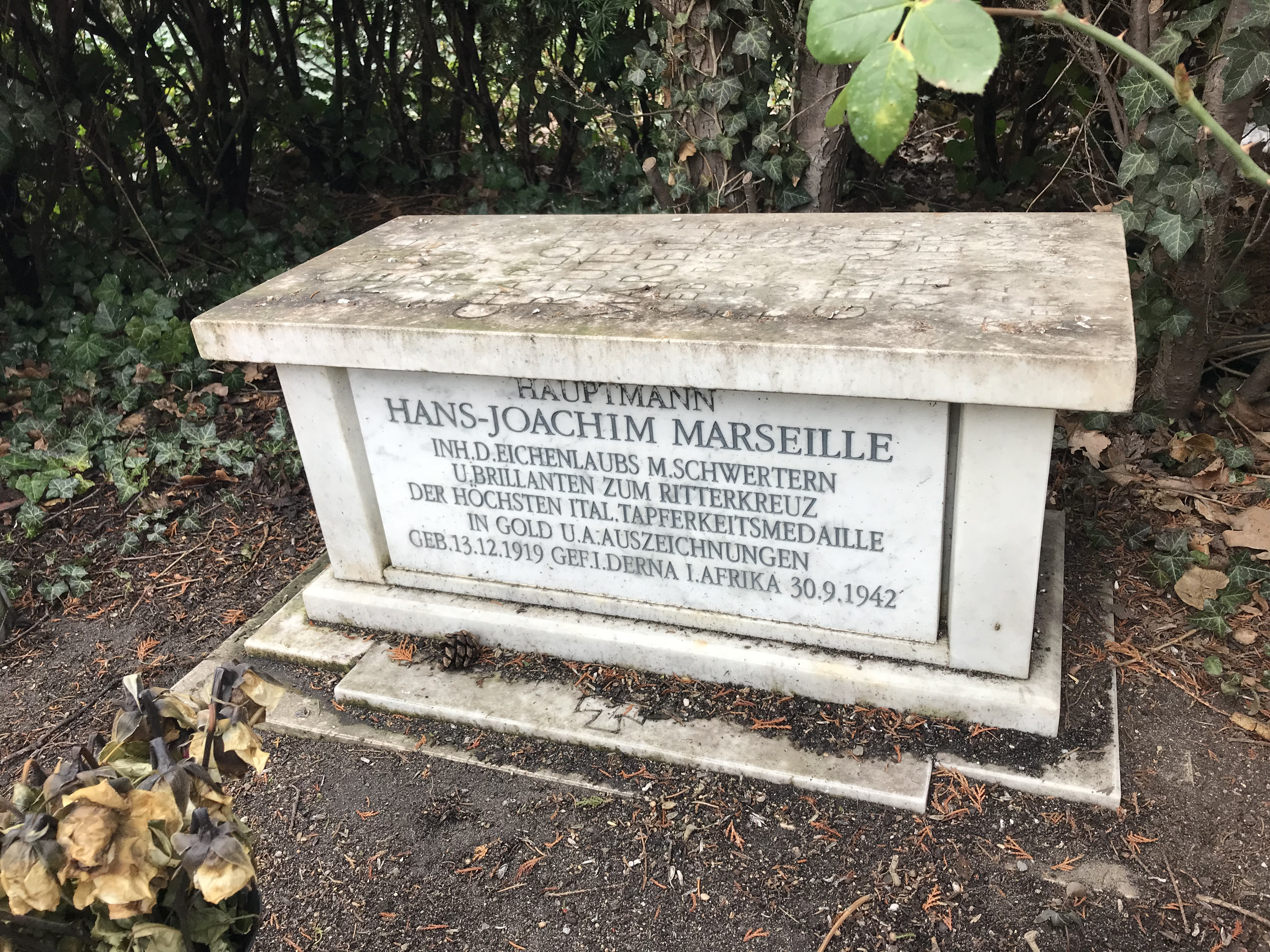
The Marseille family grave in Schöneberg

Historians Hans Ring and Christopher Shores also point to the fact that Marseille's promotions were based on personal success rates more than any other reason, and other pilots did not get to score air victories, let alone become Experten themselves. They flew support as the "maestro showed them how it was done", and often "held back from attacking enemy aircraft to build his score still higher". As a result, there were no other Experten to step into Marseille's shoes if he was killed. Eduard Neumann explained:

"This handicap [that very few pilots scored] was partially overcome by the morale effect on the whole Geschwader of the success of pilots like Marseille. In fact, most of the pilots in Marseille's Staffel acted in secondary roles as escorts to the 'master.'"

Marseille's impact on Allied fighter pilots and their morale is unclear. Andrew Thomas quoted Pilot Officer Bert Houle of No. 213 Squadron RAF; "He was an extremely skilled pilot and a deadly shot. It was a helpless feeling to be continually bounced, and to do so little about it." Robert Tate, in contrast, is sceptical Allied pilots would have been familiar, asking, "How well was Marseille known to Desert Air Force (DAF) personnel in the Desert? Apparently not so well. Although there is a little indication that some Allied pilots may have heard of Marseille, this information did not readily make its way down to Allied Squadrons. Fanciful stories abound of how pilots knew of one another and hoped to duel with each other in the skies. This was more than likely not the case."

== In propaganda and popular culture ==
Marseille appeared four times in the Deutsche Wochenschau, the German propaganda newsreel. The first time was on Wednesday 17 February 1942 when Adolf Galland, the General der Jagdflieger, visited an airport in the desert. The second time was on Wednesday 1 July 1942 when Marseille travelled to Rastenburg to receive the Knight's Cross of the Iron Cross with Oak Leaves and Swords from Adolf Hitler. The third time was on Wednesday 9 September 1942 announcing Marseille's 17 aerial victories from 1 September 1942 and that he had been awarded the Diamonds to his Knight's Cross. His last appearance was on 30 September 1942 showing Marseille visiting Erwin Rommel.

The press, from magazines to journals, featured Marseille prolifically during 1942. Der Adler used his image for a front cover on 7 and 14 July 1942. Marseille's death did not prohibit his inclusion in the Die Wehrmacht on 21 and 28 October 1942. Signal featured him on the cover in September 1942. Berliner Illustrierte Zeitung put him on their cover on 4 July 1942.

In 1957, a German film, Der Stern von Afrika (The Star of Africa) directed by Alfred Weidenmann, was made starring Joachim Hansen as Hans-Joachim Marseille. The movie was a fictionalised account of Marseille's wartime service.

== Attitude toward Nazism ==
=== German Military History Research Office ===
The German Military History Research Office (MGFA) published a brief evaluation of Marseille in early 2013, stating that "occasional attempts in the popular literature to suggest Marseille's unsoldierly bravado and honest character points to an ideological distance to National Socialism are misleading". MGFA concluded that, since there is no academic biography of Marseille, "it is not known that Hans-Joachim Marseille has, through his overall actions or through a single outstanding deed, earned praise in the service for freedom and justice [as defined in the current guidelines for military tradition]".

In 2019, Dr Eberhard Birk and Heiner Möllers published Die Luftwaffe und ihre Traditionen: Schriften zur Geschichte der Deutschen Luftwaffe. In the chapter Ist das noch Tradition - oder muss das weg? Der Jagdflieger Hans-Joachim Marseille - Namensgeber der "Marseille-Kaserne" in Appen [Is this still tradition, or must it go? The fighter pilot Hans-Joachim Marseille, namesake of the Marseille Barracks in Appen] the historians discuss Marseille and his character. The chapter asserts that the stories told about Marseille are rooted in wartime [Nazi] propaganda. They doubt whether Marseille's reputation is sufficient to allow him to act as a role model in the modern German military. However, they assert, like Werner Mölders, that Marseille was not a political soldier, but apolitical, despite the prevailing political situation in the Third Reich.

=== Biographies ===
Several biographies of Hans-Joachim Marseille have described his disdain for authority and for the National Socialist (Nazi) movement in general. Some biographers, such as Colin Heaton, describe him as "openly anti-Nazi". When Marseille first met Hitler in 1942, he did not form a positive impression. After returning to Africa, Eduard Neumann recalled, "After his first visit with Hitler, Marseille returned and said that he thought 'the Führer was a rather odd sort'." On the visit, Marseille also said some unflattering things about Hitler and the Nazi Party. Several senior officers, which included Adolf Galland and Nicolaus von Below, overheard his remarks during one of the award ceremonies. Von Below asked Marseille whether he would join the Nazi Party and Marseille responded, within earshot of others, "that if he saw a party worth joining, he would consider it, but there would have to be plenty of attractive women in it." The remarks visibly upset Hitler, who was left "puzzled" by Marseille's behaviour.

At the home of Willy Messerschmitt, industrialist and designer of the Messerschmitt Bf 109 fighter, Marseille played American Jazz on Messerschmitt's piano in front of Adolf Hitler, party chairman Martin Bormann, Hitler's deputy and Commander-in-Chief of the Luftwaffe Hermann Göring, head of the SS Heinrich Himmler and Reich Minister of Propaganda Joseph Goebbels. Hitler allegedly left the room. Magda Goebbels found the prank amusing and Artur Axmann recalled how his "blood froze" when he heard this "Ragtime" music being played in front of the Führer.

Later that month Marseille was invited to another party function, despite his earlier stunt. Obergruppenführer Karl Wolff, of Personal Staff Reichsführer-SS, confirmed that during his visit Marseille overheard a conversation which mentioned crimes against the Jews and other people. He stated:

Globocnik and I were talking about Operation Reinhard, which was in full effect following Heydrich's murder, and also the construction of Sobibor and Treblinka. I know I asked him about Höss, who was also standing there and had been summoned by Himmler regarding logistics or something regarding the new camp (Auschwitz). Then Globocnik mentioned to me and Kaltenbrunner that Lidice had been cleared, and all the Jews and Czechs had been dealt with. I noticed that this young pilot, who I later learned was Marseille, must have overheard, and I debated whether I should go over and say something to him. I decided against it.

When Marseille returned to his unit, he reportedly asked his friends Franzisket, Clade and Schröer whether they had heard what was happening to Jews and if perhaps something was underway that they did not know about. Franszisket recalled that he had heard Jews were being relocated to territory gained in the East but no more. Marseille recounted how he had attempted to ask questions about Jews who had vanished from his own neighbourhood, including the family doctor who had delivered him at birth. Regardless of his hero status, when he attempted to bring the subject into any conversation with people who approached him, his enquiries were either met with awkward silences, people changed the subject, or even turned away. Franzisket noticed a change in Marseille's attitude toward his nation's cause. He never spoke of this with his comrades again.

Marseille's friendship with his adopted helper also is used to show his anti-Nazi character. In 1942, Marseille befriended a black South African Army prisoner of war, Corporal Mathew Letuku, nicknamed Mathias. Marseille took him as a personal helper rather than allow him to be sent to a prisoner-of-war camp in Europe. Over time, Marseille and Mathias became inseparable. Marseille was concerned about how Mathias would be treated by other units of the Wehrmacht and once remarked "Where I go, Mathias goes." Marseille secured promises from his senior commander, Neumann, that if anything should happen to him [Marseille] Mathias was to be kept with the unit. Mathias duly remained with JG 27 until the end of the war and attended post-war reunions until his death in 1984.

Biographer Robert Tate went further in his examination. During his research, he contacted Professor Rafael Scheck, head of History at Colby College. Scheck published Hitler's African Victims: The German Army Massacres of Black French Soldiers in 1940 and is an acknowledged expert on racial theory and in Nazi Germany. Without being familiar with Marseille, Scheck identified his friendship with Corporal Mathew P. Letuku as being in direct contradiction to the Nazi mandate. Letuku, alias Mathias to everyone in JG 27, was a black South African soldier taken prisoner of war by German troops on the morning of 21 June 1941 at Tobruk fortress. Mathias initially worked as a volunteer driver with 3. Staffel then befriended Marseille and became his domestic helper in Africa. Scheck doubted that Marseille's "acquisition" of Mathias and his role as Marseille's "batman" was done out of disrespect. Scheck said, "I know of the camp commandant of the concentration camp of Mauthausen, who held a black man as his personal servant. This was done out of disrespect, however. I do not think that aspect was relevant for Marseille." When questioned on Marseille's behaviour, Scheck said: "I do not find it odd because I am accustomed to seeing many nuances among the Germans of the Third Reich. But his behaviour would probably be startling for many other researchers." Tate also noted Marseille's penchant for Cuban rumba by Ernesto Lecuona, jazz, and swing, which he believes was another way Marseille resisted Nazi ideals.

== Memorials ==
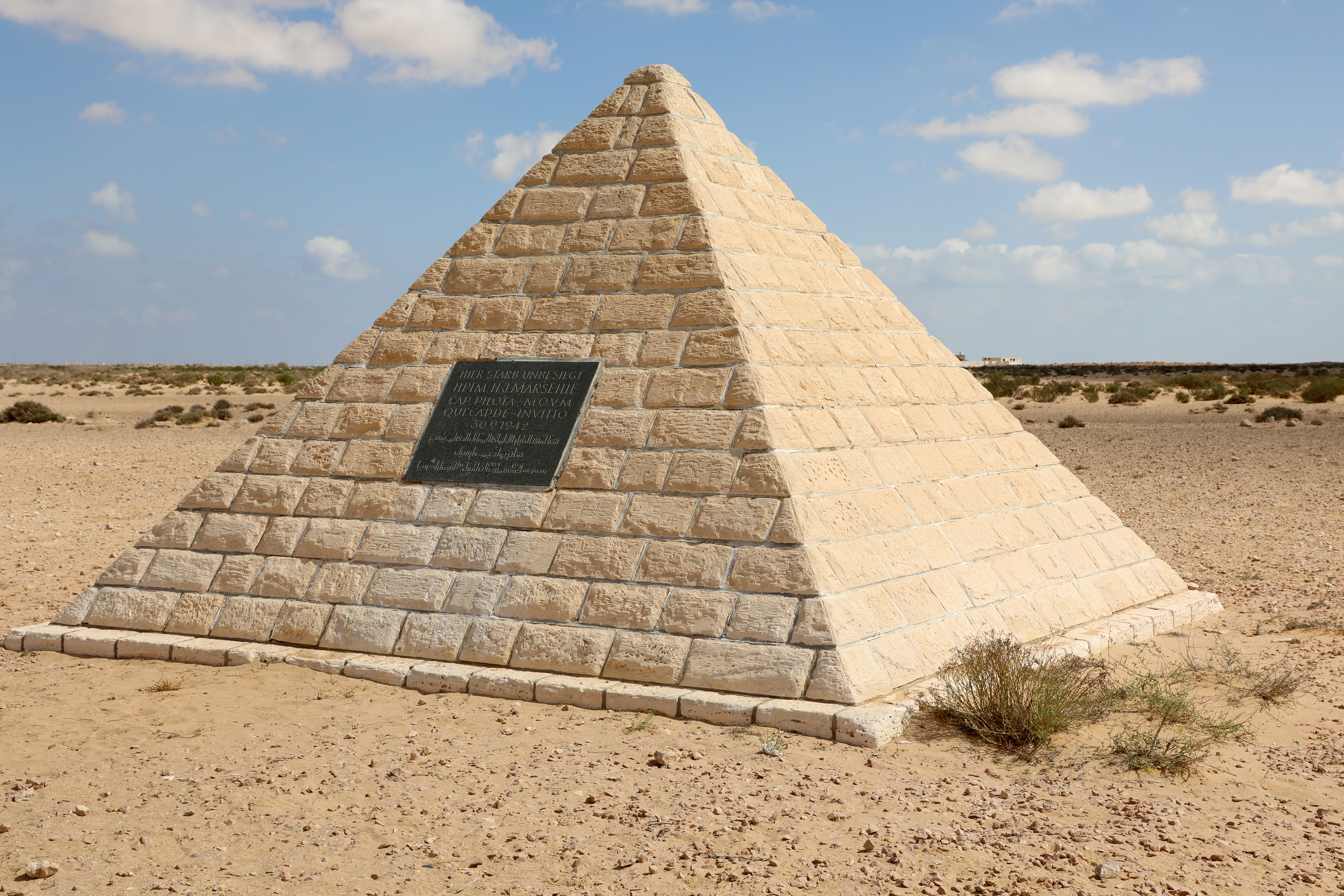
Marseille Pyramid in Sidi Abd el-Rahman, Egypt

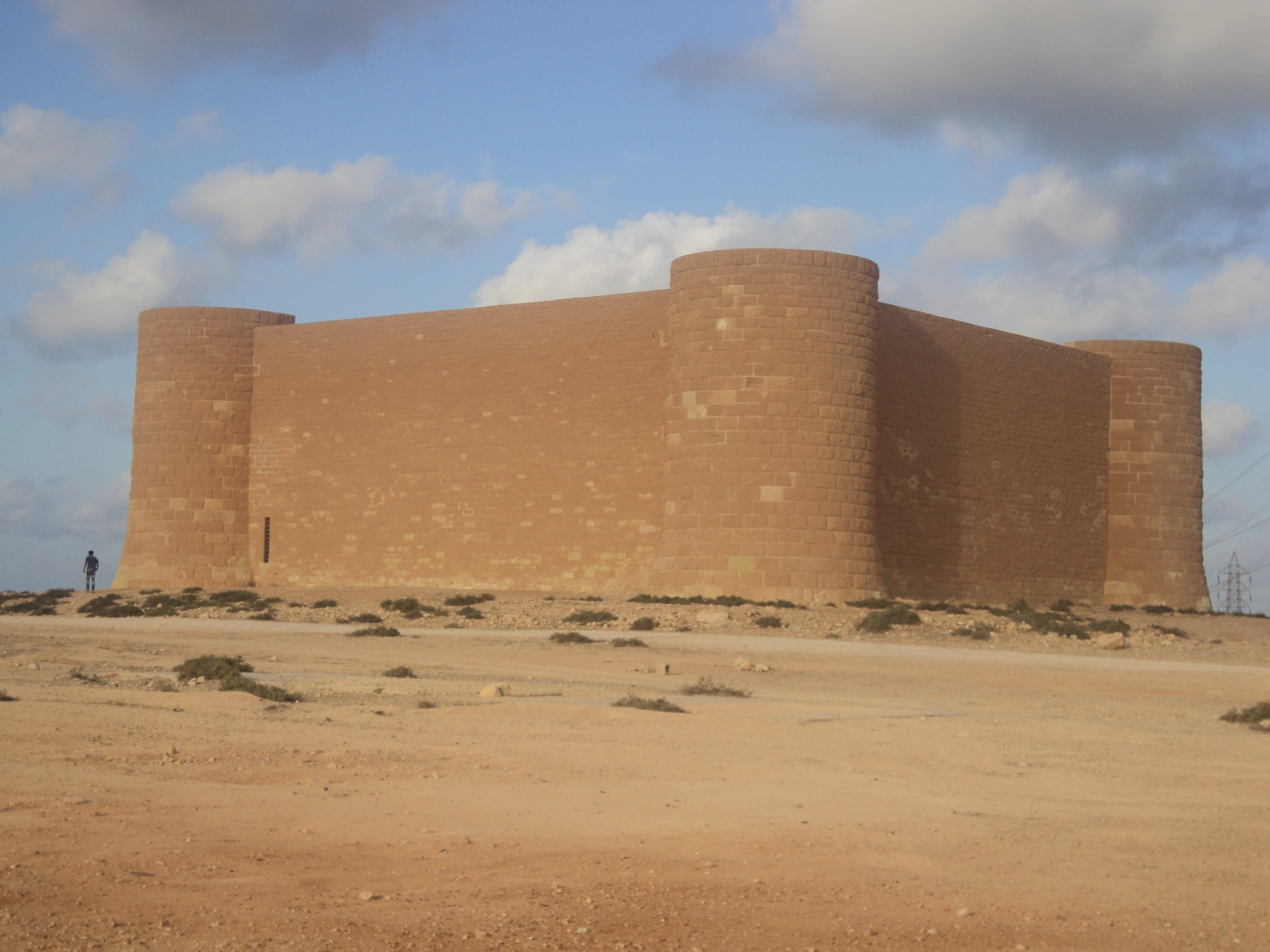
German war memorial, Tobruk

- A wartime pyramid was constructed by Italian engineers at the site of Marseille's fall but over time it decayed. On 22 October 1989, Eduard Neumann and other former JG 27 personnel, in co-operation with the Egyptian government, erected a new pyramid. (Note: "30°53'26.80"N and 28°41'42.87"E." Google Maps. Retrieved 25 September 2007.) In 2019, the visual artist Heba Amin rebuilt the Marseille Pyramid at the Zentrum für verfolgte Künste (Center for Persecuted Arts), a museum in Solingen commemorating art and artists persecuted as degenerate art by the Nazis. The replica was part of her exhibition "Fruit from Saturn" and was intended as a symbol for the remains of European ideologies during Hitler's Africa campaign.
- In the weeks following Marseille's death 3./JG 27 was renamed as the "Marseille Staffel" (seen in photographs as "Staffel Marseille").
- His grave bears a one-word epitaph: Undefeated. It is understood that Marseille's remains were brought from Derna and reinterred in the Tobruk German war cemetery. They are now in a small clay coffin (sarcophagus) bearing the number 4133.
- The tail rudder of his second to last Messerschmitt Bf 109 F-4/trop (Werknummer 8673) now bearing 158 victory marks is on display at Luftwaffenmuseum der Bundeswehr in Berlin-Gatow. It had initially been given to his family as a gift by Hermann Göring and was donated to the museum.

== Summary of career ==
=== Aerial victory claims ===
Marseille was transferred to his first combat assignment with the I.(Jagd)/Lehrgeschwader 2 at the time stationed at Calais-Marck on Sunday 10 August 1940. Two days later he arrived at this unit on 12 August 1940. He was assigned to the 1. Staffel of this Gruppe. Staffelkapitän was Oberleutnant Adolf Buhl. One of the Schwarmführer was Oberfeldwebel Helmut Goedert, to whom Marseille was assigned as wingman. Marseille flew his first combat mission on the next day, Wednesday 13 August 1940 and claimed his first aerial victory on 24 August 1940. In over little more than two years he amassed another 157 aerial victories. His 158 aerial victories were claimed in 382 combat missions. Spick states that Marseille had a mission-to-claim ratio of 2.42.

=== Claims and effectiveness ===
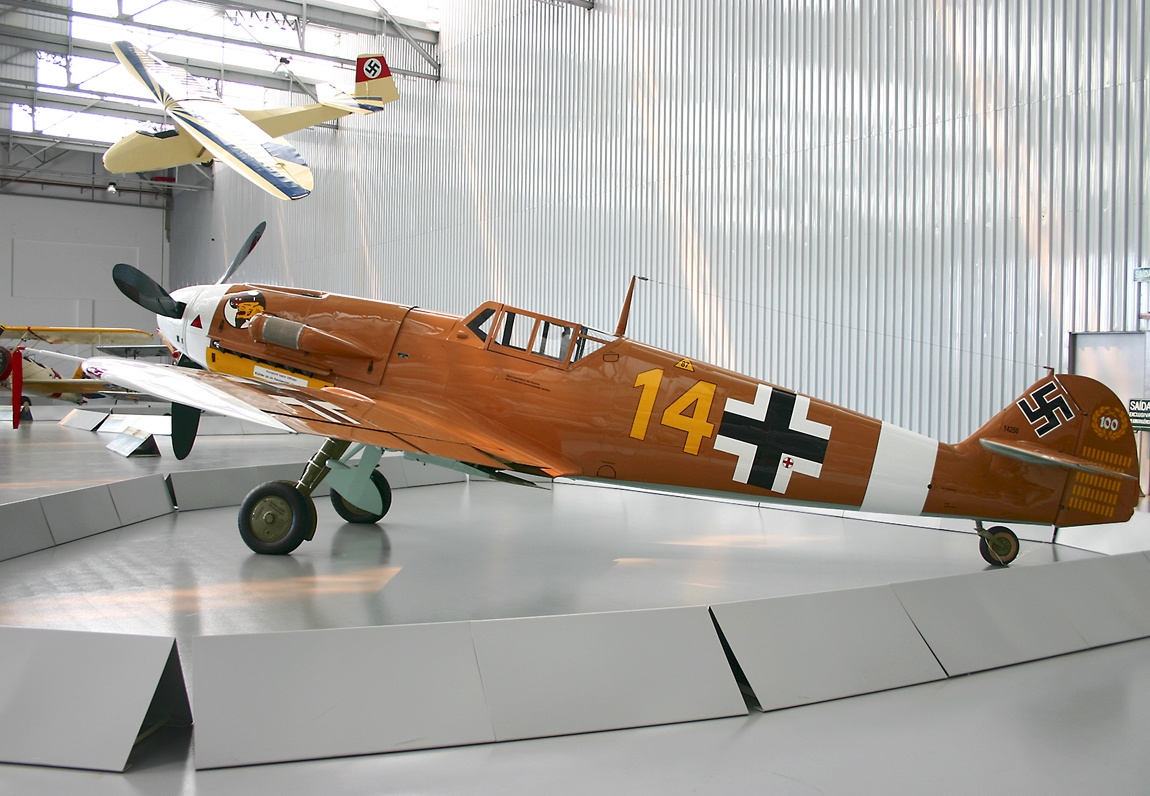
Bf 109 G-2 painted with markings of Marseille's aircraft on display at the Museu TAM in São Carlos, Brazil

Some serious discrepancies between Allied squadron records and German claims have caused some historians and Allied veterans to question the accuracy of Marseille's official victories, in addition to those of JG 27 as a whole. Attention has often focused on the claims from two days in particular: 1 and 15 September 1942.

A USAF historian, Major Robert Tate, found that Marseille's career can be corroborated 65–70 per cent; as many as 50 of his claims may not have actually been aerial victories. (Note: Tate found similar corroboration rates for Allied pilots during the same period: Clive Caldwell (50% to 60% corroboration), Billy Drake (70% to 80% corroboration), John Lloyd Waddy (70% to 80% corroboration) and Nicky Barr (60% to 70% corroboration))

Of 26 claims made by JG 27 on 1 September 1942, 17 were claimed by Marseille alone. Tate points out that Allied military sources and historians, for many years, had not acknowledged the loss of any aircraft in North Africa on that date. However, according to Tate, the Allies did lose "more than 17 aircraft that day ... in the area that Marseille operated." Tate found that 20 RAF/SAAF single-engined fighters and one twin-engine fighter were destroyed and several others severely damaged, as well as one USAAF P-40 shot down. Christopher Shores and Hans Ring also support Tate's conclusions. British historian Stephen Bungay gives a figure of 20 Allied losses that day.

The claims for 15 September 1942 are in serious doubt, following the first detailed scrutiny of the records of individual Allied squadrons by Australian historian Russell Brown. Brown gives three occasions on which Marseille could not have downed as many aircraft as claimed. Christopher Shores et al say that Marseille over-claimed on occasion, particularly in September 1942. They concluded Marseille had developed such a supreme confidence in his ability his mentality dictated, "If I fire at it, it must go down." They estimate two-thirds to three-quarters of his claims were aircraft that were destroyed, crash-landed or at least were heavily damaged.

Axis fighter pilots, including Marseille, destroyed very few bombers over North Africa. (Note: About 12% of claims made by German pilots were for bombers while for the Allies it was nearly 50%) By mid-1942, Allied bombers were having a highly damaging effect on Axis ground units and convoy routes reducing the flow of vital fuel. Bungay pointed out the relatively low military value of shooting down Allied fighters, rather than bombers saying that "most of the pilots of JG 27 milled about watching in awe as Marseille exhibited his graceful if gory skills". (Note: One of the reasons Rommel cites for breaking off the Battle of Alam el Halfa on 2 September was the "Allied air superiority" which had played a key role in crippling his supply lines.) Referring to 1 September 1942, Bungay points out that assuming Marseille shot down 15 of the 17 he claimed that day, "all the rest of the 100 or so German fighter pilots (Note: The figure of "100 or so German pilots" represents the Geschwader's entire strength.) between them only got five. The British [sic] lost no bombers at all..." and that "internal rivalry over star status took precedence over military effectiveness." During this period the DAF lost only a few bombers; all to anti-aircraft defences and evidence shows that Rommel was forced onto the defensive because of the losses inflicted by bombers.

=== Decorations ===
1 February 1940:	Aviator badge
9 September 1940:	Iron Cross Second Class for two air victories.
17 September 1940:	Iron Cross First Class for fourth air victory.
3 November 1941:	Honour Goblet of the Luftwaffe.
24 November 1941:	German Cross in Gold (the first German pilot to receive this award in Africa.) for 25 victories. After returning from a combat mission having just claimed his 35th and 36th victory, the Award was presented to Marseille by Field Marshal Albert Kesselring on 17 December 1941.
22 February 1942:	416th Knight's Cross of the Luftwaffe as Leutnant and pilot in the 3./JG 27 for reaching 46 victories. By the time the award was officially processed and handed out to him his score stood at 50 victories. Kesselring presented the award. Also awarded near this date was the Italian Silver Medal for bravery (Silver Medal of Military Valor).
6 June 1942:	Becomes the 97th recipient of the Oak Leaves to the Knight's Cross as Oberleutnant and pilot in the 3./JG 27 for 75 victories. The Oak Leaves were never presented to Marseille because a few days later he had already received the Swords and Oak Leaves.
18 June 1942:	12th recipient of Swords to the Knight's cross with Oak Leaves as Oberleutnant and Staffelkapitän of the 3./JG 27 (presented by Hitler in the Wolfsschanze in Rastenburg).
August 1942:	Awarded the Combined Pilots-Observation Badge in Gold with Diamonds, (presented by Reichsmarschall Hermann Göring).
August 1942	Benito Mussolini presented Hans-Joachim Marseille the Gold Medal of Military Valour (Medaglia d'oro al Valore Militare) in Rome, Italy.
3 September 1942:	Becomes only the fourth German serviceman to be awarded the Diamonds to the Knight's Cross with Oak Leaves and Swords as Oberleutnant and Staffelkapitän of the 3./JG 27.
16 September 1942:	Early promotion to Hauptmann – Youngest captain in the Luftwaffe.
30 November 1962:	The Italian Minister of Defence Giulio Andreotti paid the relatives of Marseille an honorary one-time pension of 1,500 DM.
Front Flying Clasp of the Luftwaffe in Gold with Pennant "300"

Sometime in the early 1990s, one of Marseille's biographers, Robert Tate, visited the former Marseille-Kaserne base and Museum to see and photograph Marseille's medals. When he arrived, Tate was informed the Knights Cross, Oak Leaves, Swords and Diamonds belonging to Marseille had been stolen.

=== Dates of rank ===
Marseille joined the military service in Wehrmacht on 7 November 1938. His first station was Quedlinburg in the Harz region where he received his military basic training as a Luftwaffe recruit.

7 November 1938:	Flieger
13 March 1939:	Fahnenjunker (officer cadet)
1 May 1939:	Fahnenjunker-Gefreiter
1 July 1939:	Fahnenjunker-Unteroffizier
1 November 1939:	Fähnrich (officer candidate)
1 March 1941:	Oberfähnrich
16 June 1941:	Leutnant (second lieutenant), effective as of 1 April 1941
8 May 1942:	Oberleutnant (first lieutenant) effective as of 1 April 1942
19 September 1942 (Note: According to Tate on 16 September 1942.):	Hauptmann (captain) effective as of 1 September 1942
