= Robert Détroyat =

French naval officer (1929–1941)

- Born: 8 January 1911; Tours, France
- Died: June 1941 (age 30); Syria
- Military career
- Allegiance: France
- Branch: French Navy
- Service years: 1929–1941
- Rank: Corvette captain
- Commands: Compagnon de la Libération
- Conflicts: World War II
- Awards: See Awards

Robert Détroyat (8 January 1911 – June 1941) was a French naval officer and Compagnon de la Libération. He served in the French Navy before joining the Free French Forces. He was the cousin of French aviator Michel Détroyat.

== Career ==
Son of Brigadier General Marie Armand Paul André Détroyat, he studied in Paris, Rome, Sainte-Croix de Neuilly where he obtained the baccalaureate in 1927, then at Sainte-Geneviève de Versailles.

He entered the Naval Academy in 1929 and left it in 1931 with the rank of ensign.

He served in the Naval Forces of the Levant, then in the Marines. He was promoted to lieutenant in 1939.

Returned to France in February 1940, he was appointed commander of Chasseur 5 in Cherbourg.

In July 1940, following the appeal of June 18, he joined the Free French Naval Forces.

He was entrusted with the mission of forming a unit of Marines by Admiral Muselier. Commander of the 1st Battalion of Marines (1er BFM), he was promoted to lieutenant commander and embarked aboard the Westernland towards Dakar in August 1940. He took part in the Battle of Gabon, then found himself towards the Suez Canal and Syria. He advanced towards Damascus at the head of his troops on 21 June 1941 and stopped at Mezze. He was mortally wounded by a burst of submachine gun while going to join his assistant Jean des Moutis.

He is buried in Saint-Pierre-d'Irube.

== Awards ==
Légion d'honneur (Chevalier)

Compagnon de la Libération

Croix de Guerre 1939–1945

Croix de guerre des théâtres d'opérations extérieures

Médaille de la Résistance

== Legacy ==
- A French D'Estienne d'Orves-class aviso has been named after him.
- The Marine Military Preparation of Tours PMM "Captain of Corvette Détroyat" is named in his honor.
- The Mediterranean Marines Battalion was named the Détroyat Marines Battalion on 1 September 2021.

== See also ==
- French military ranks
