= Mohamed Bel Hadj (Algerian-French soldier) =

Mohamed Bel Hadj (1904 – 10 January 1945) was an Algerian-French army lieutenant and French resister. He distinguished himself by switching sides from Vichy to Free French forces after becoming injured in Lebanon and saving his unit commander during fighting in Libya. He was mortally wounded by a landmine while leading an operation in eastern France.

== Biography ==
He was presumed to have been born in Saïda, Algeria in 1904 [other sources say 1905] which was then a French-controlled colony. He volunteered to join the French army in Saïda in August 1923 and was incorporated as a 2nd-class rifleman in the 10e régiment de tirailleurs algériens (10e RTA) [10th Algerian Rifle Regiment] before joining the 6e RTA. He served in Morocco for four years. Assigned to the Levant in September 1928, he served there for eleven years with the 6e RTA. He was successively promoted to corporal in 1930, sergeant in 1933 and then staff sergeant in 1937.

Bel Hadj was transferred again in November 1940 to the 10e RTA following the dissolution of the 6e RTA and took part in what was now the Vichy army campaign in Syria and Lebanon against the British, Australian Indian and Gaullist forces. He was wounded in the leg by shrapnel on 19 June 1941 in the Battle of Merdjayoun. On August 6, 1941, he chose to desert the Vichy-supporting Armée du Levant to join the Free French Forces.

Promoted to warrant officer in October 1941, he was assigned from its creation to the 22e Compagnie Nord-Africaine (22e CNA) (22nd North-African company) formed from North-African riflemen who supported Free France. The company was attached to the 1st Free French Brigade of General Koenig and took part in the Libyan campaign. At the Battle of Bir Hakeim, in June 1942, Bel Hadj twice risked his own life to save that of his company commander, Captain Pierre Lequesne. On 1 July 1943, the 22e CNA became the 22e bataillon de marche nord-africain (22e BMNA).

Bel Hadj took part in the Italian campaign where he landed with the 1re division française libre (1re DFL) (1st Free French Division) on 20 April 1944. Promoted to chief warrant officer on 1 July, he landed in Provence on 17 August and engaged in the liberation battles of Provence and the Rhône valley. In November 1944, the battalion was attached to the 2nd Brigade of the 1re DFL. Bel Hadj was promoted to second lieutenant on 25 November 1944.

On January 9, 1945, during the Battle of Alsace, he jumped on a mine while leading a patrol in Dambach, Bas-Rhin. Mortally wounded, he said to the doctor: "Lieutenant Bel Hadj is going to die, but that does not matter. Long live France!" He died within an hour of his transfer to the hospital.

Bel Hadj was buried in the national cemetery of Sigolsheim in the Haut-Rhin département.

== Awards and legacy ==
He received the Syria-Cilicia medal, the Syrian Merit, the Colonial Medal with Morocco staple, the Médaille des blessés de guerre in 1941, the Médaille militaire for his actions in Libya and the Croix de Guerre. He was posthumously made a Compagnon de la Liberation by decree on 17 November 1945.

On 15 August 2019, commemorating the 75th anniversary of the landings in Provence, President Macron cited the service of Bel Hadj:

"I am thinking of another companion of the Liberation, Lieutenant Mohamed BEL HADJ. Born in Algeria in 1905, in June 1942 in Bir-Hakeim, then warrant officer, he saved twice, risking his life, his Company Commander. Landed in Provence on August 17 with his brothers in arms of the 22nd North African Marching Battalion, Mohamed BEL HADJ died for France on January 10, 1945 during the Alsace campaign. He said to the doctor who was trying to treat his wound: 'Lieutenant BEL HADJ is going to die but that doesn't matter. Long live France!' Rightly honoured by their comrades of the day, these African fighters, for many decades, did not have the glory and esteem their bravery warranted."
