= Raymond Appert =

French general (1904-1973)

Raymond Appert (4 October 1904 – 17 April 1973) was a French general. During World War II, he joined the Free French forces, and was active during the liberation of France. Raymond received three medals for his time during the War: Order of Liberation, the Belgian Croix de Guerre and the French Croix de Guerre.

His father was an insurance broker.

He died on April 17, 1973, in Saint-Mandé.
