= Alexandre Parodi =

French senior civil servant

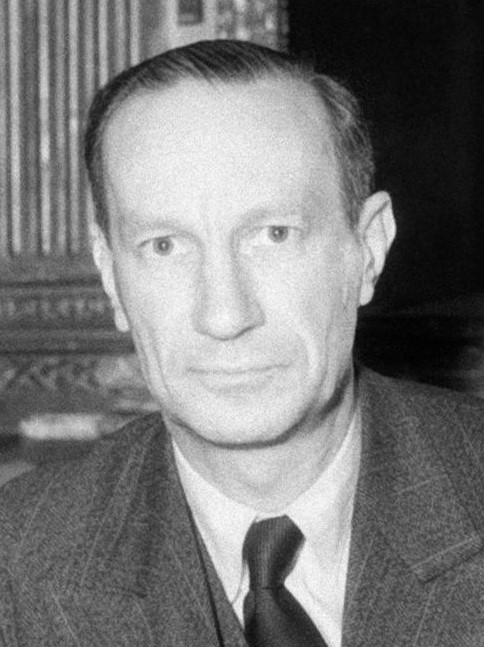
- Alexandre Parodi in 1945.

Vice-president of the Council of State
- In office 29 September 1960 – 1 June 1971
- Preceded by: René Cassin
- Succeeded by: Bernard Chenot

Minister of Labour and Social Security
- In office 9 September 1944 – 21 October 1945
- President: Charles de Gaulle (head of the Provisional Government of the French Republic
- Preceded by: Marcel Déat (indirectly, Vichy France minister); Adrien Tixier (indirectly, CFLN commissioner)
- Succeeded by: Ambroise Croizat

State Commissioner for the Liberated Regions
- In office 26 August 1944 – 10 September 1944 Serving with Henri Queuille; André Le Troquer; François Billoux
- President: Charles de Gaulle (head of the Provisional Government of the French Republic
- Preceded by: Henri Claude Maître (indirectly, Under-secretary of State)
- Succeeded by: Office terminated

General Delegate of the French Committee of National Liberation in occupied France
- In office February 1944 – August 1944
- Preceded by: Émile Bollaert

Ambassador of France
- In office 1946–1960

Personal details
- Born: Alexandre Maurice Marie Parodi; 1 June 1901 17th arrondissement of Paris
- Died: 15 March 1979 (aged 77) 7th arrondissement of Paris
- Party: None
- Parent: Dominique Parodi, philosopher (father)
- Relatives: René Parodi, magistrate, resistant (brother)
- Awards: Companions of Liberation
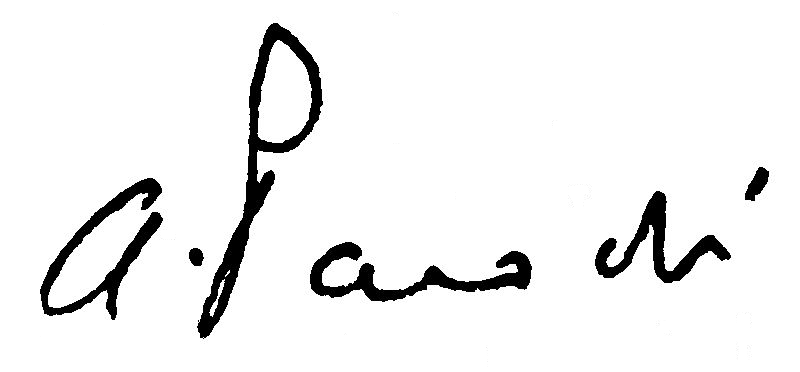
- Signature

Alexandre Parodi (1 June 1901 – 15 March 1979) [aliases Quartus and Cérat] was a French senior civil servant, a member of the French resistance, General de Gaulle's appointee in charge of the French provisional government during World War II, a politician, permanent representative to the United Nations and NATO and the first French ambassador to Morocco.

== Biography ==
He was the son of Marie Emilie Hélène Vavin (known as Hélène) and Dominique Parodi, who was a philosopher and a member of the Institut de France. His grandfather Dominique-Alexandre Parodi was a poet and dramatist. The family was a republican one. Parodi became an auditor for the Conseil d'État (France) in 1926. From 1929 to 1938 he was deputy secretary-general of the Conseil national économique (National Economic Council), now the Conseil économique, social et environnemental. He married Anne-Marie Vautier on 2 January 1931 in Switzerland. In 1938 he became Maître des Requêtes, a high-ranking legal administrative officer, for the Conseil d'État (civil service), a technical advisor for the ministry of labour and the following year the director-general of labour and manpower.

Although he was a lieutenant in the infantry reserve upon the outbreak of World War II, he was not called up because of his civil-service role. In October 1940, he was dismissed by the Vichy régime which suspected him of anti-Vichy feelings ("mal penser") and returned to the Conseil d'État now in the Puy de Dôme. From 1942, he made frequent trips to Haute Savoie and also visited his wife who was unwell in Switzerland nearby. At this time, his brother, the magistrate René Parodi, part of the Liberation-Nord resistance movement, was arrested by the Gestapo; he was found hanged in his cell in April 1942. In Haute Savoie, Parodi met two politically-active professors of law, François de Menthon and Paul Bastid (the latter also dismissed by Vichy), and lawyer Robert Lacoste; the four founded, at Jean Moulin's suggestion, the Comité des Experts, which became the Comité général d'études at the end of 1943. Using the name Quartus, Parodi and his collaborators discussed post-occupation administrative arrangements.

In summer 1943, following the seizure of general-delegation documents by the Gestapo in Paris, he went into hiding. In September 1943, he was appointed head of the commission clandestine de la Presse et de l'Information. He also took part in the creation of the comité financier de la Résistance. In March 1944, Charles de Gaulle replaced Jacques Bingen with Parodi as the general delegate of the Comité Français de Libération Nationale (CFLN), the provisional administration coordinating resistance and making preparations for government after liberation from the Nazis.

In August 1944, using the alias "Cérat", he was made Minister of the Liberated Territories and took up the role in Paris when the insurrection began. On 17 August, he obtained from the Conseil national de la Résistance (CNR) permission to suspend the outbreak of the insurrection. On the 19th, to keep the resistance united, he agreed with the CNR and the Comité parisien de la Libération to the proclamation of the insurrection, without informing the leader of the Free France forces, General Koenig. He placed the Parisian resistance under the control of Colonel Henri Rol-Tanguy. With two assistants, engineers Roland Pré and Émile Laffon, he was arrested on 20 August by the Nazis when a truce proposed by the Swedish Consul-General Raoul Nordling came into force. He openly admitted his ministerial status and insisted on meeting General Dietrich von Choltitz, military commander of Paris, who released them presently. On 21 August, the truce was broken and on 22 August, Parodi chaired a meeting of the provisional secretaries of state at the Hotel de Matignon to set up the new administration. On 25 August, the day von Choltitz surrendered, he welcomed de Gaulle to Paris. On 27 August, de Gaulle appointed him Compagnon de la Libération.

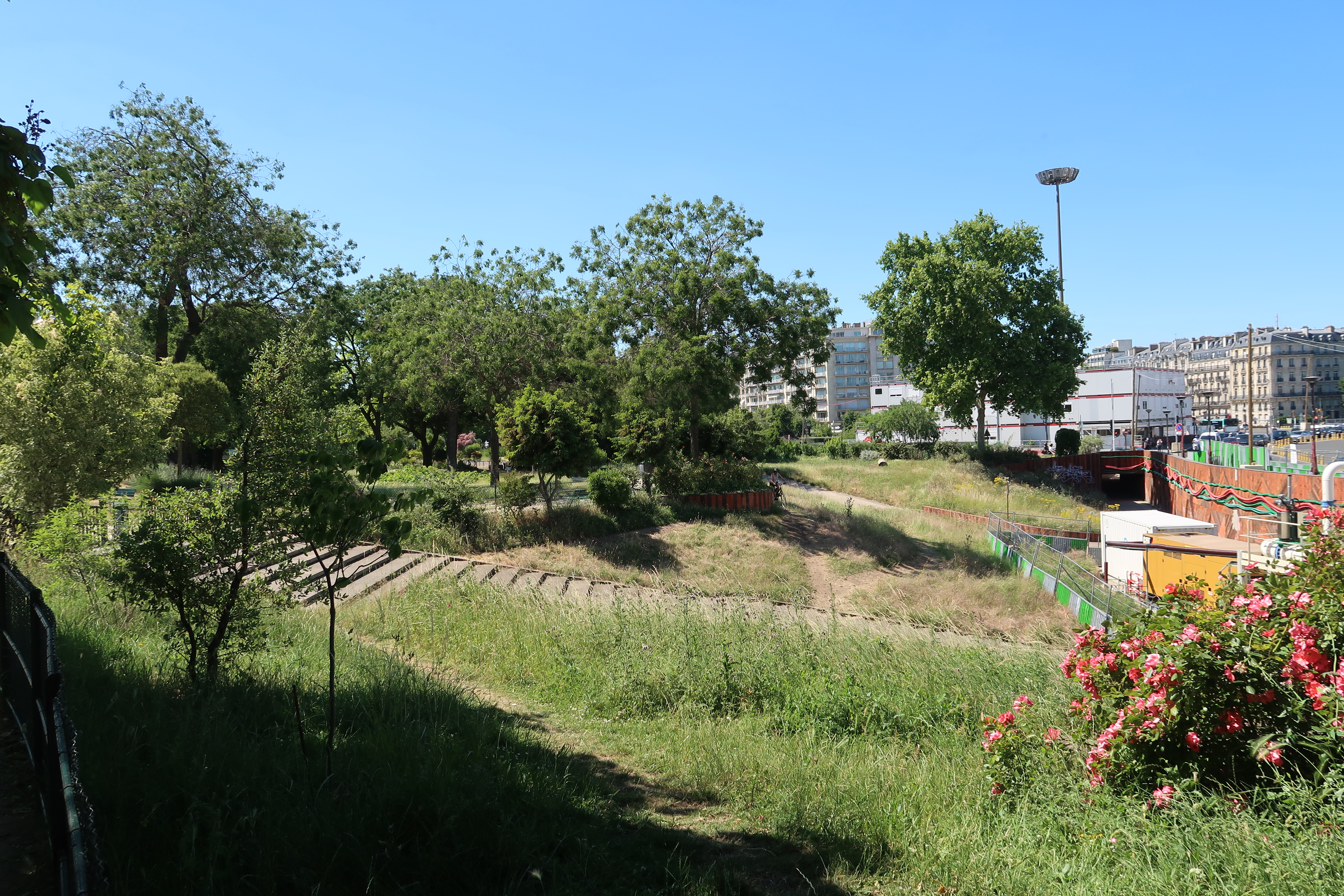
Square Alexandre-et-René-Parodi, 16th Arrondissement, Paris [Polymagou - CC-BY-SA

]

From September 1944 to November 1945, he was the Minister of Labour and Social Security and oversaw the introduction of the French national health service. He was appointed a state councillor in December 1945, and began a diplomatic career in 1946; the same year he was the main French delegate in making Allied arrangements with Italy. He was the permanent delegate of France to the United Nations Security Council. In 1949, he was secretary-general of the Ministry of Foreign Affairs. In 1955 he became the permanent representative of France to NATO. From 1957 to 1960, he was the first French Ambassador to Morocco before being appointed vice-president of the Conseil d'État, succeeding René Cassin. From 1964 until 1971 he was part of the World Court in the Hague. He was President of the Fondation nationale des sciences politiques, a member from 1970 of the Académie des sciences morales et politiques and of the council of the Ordre de la Libération. He retired in 1971 and was honorary president of the Conseil d'État.

He died on 15 March 1979 at home in Paris and was buried in Père Lachaise cemetery.

== Awards and legacy ==
He was awarded the Grand Croix de la Légion d'Honneur, the Grand Croix de l'Ordre National du Mérite and made a Compagnon de la Libération. Rue Alexandre Parodi in the 10th arrondissement of Paris, is actually in memory of the grandfather that he was named after. A square-and-park honours him and his brother René in the 16th arrondissement of Paris. Parodi was played by Pierre Dux in the 1966 French-US film about the liberation of Paris, Is Paris Burning?, directed by René Clément and based on the book by Dominique Lapierre.
