= René Parodi =

French Resistance member

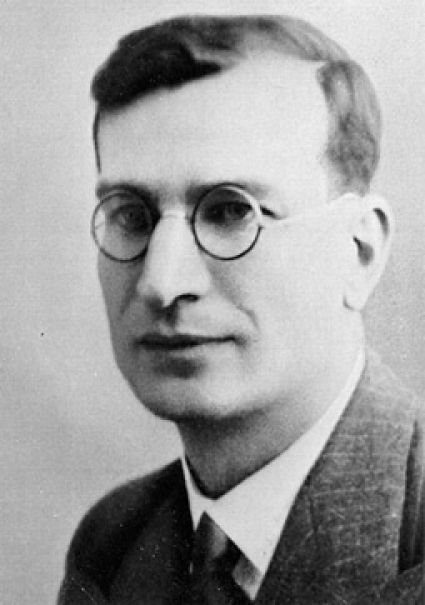
René Parodi, magistrate and resister, c.1940

René Parodi (8 December 1904 – 16 April 1942) was a French magistrate, member of the French resistance and publisher of an underground newspaper during World War II. He was reportedly hanged after torture and imprisonment by the Gestapo.

== Biography ==
He was born in Rouen, the son of Marie Emilie Hélène Vavin (known as Hélène) and Dominique Parodi, a philosopher and a member of the Institut de France. His grandfather was the dramatist and poet Dominique-Alexandre Parodi and his brother was the senior civil servant Alexandre Parodi. He became a magistrate and was appointed to Châlons-sur-Marne, then to Reims and finally Versailles. He married Jeanne Tissot in January 1932. On the outbreak of World War II he volunteered as a soldier. When the armistice was agreed, he resumed his role as a magistrate.

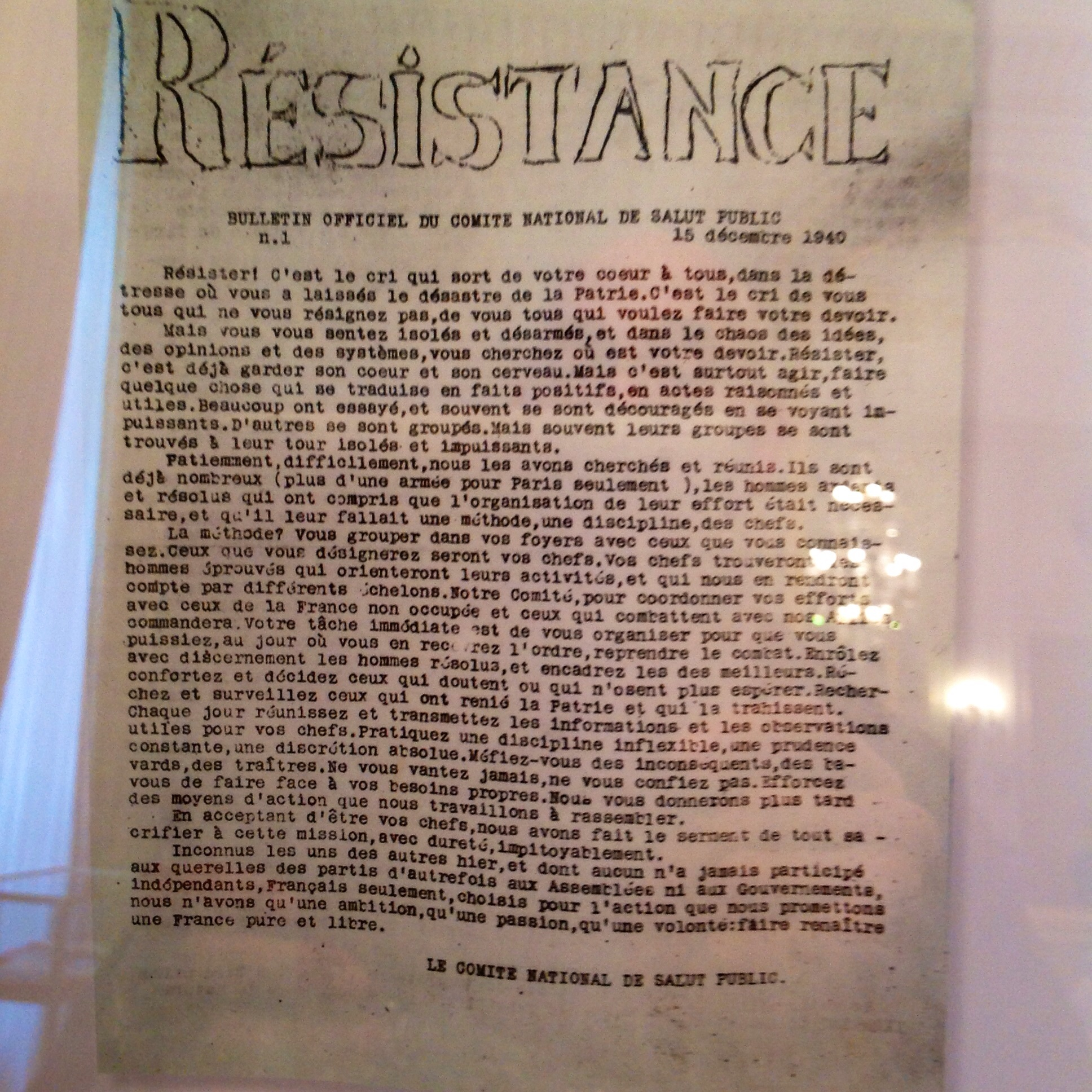
The first issue of the underground newspaper Résistance, displayed at the Russian ambassador's residence, Paris.

At the end of 1940, he organised a group of resistance fighters to write propaganda and published the underground newspaper Résistance {see image). With Christian Pineau, he helped to create the Comité d’études économiques et syndicales (Economic and Trade Union Studies Committee) which became the Liberation-Nord movement. Parodi introduced the philosopher and epistemologist Jean Cavaillès to Pineau. From December 1941, Parodi was a member of the board of directors of the movement (along with Cavaillès). He was appointed as a substitute deputy at the tribunal of the Seine in June 1941 and he combined this work with that of Versailles and with his activity as a resistance fighter. During the summer of 1941, Liberation-Nord committed acts of sabotage, including sinking barges and blocking the Canal de Bourgogne at the Yonne river, a tributary of the Seine.

On 6 February 1942, he was arrested at his home by the Gestapo, and imprisoned in Fresnes Prison. In March 1942, while he was in prison, his resistance group succeeded in lighting up the Renault factories in Boulogne-Billancourt at night so that they could be targeted and destroyed by a Royal Air Force bombardment. Parodi was tortured but did not provide any information. He was reported as being found hanged in his cell on 16 April 1942.

== Awards and legacy ==
He was posthumously made a Compagnon de la Libération on 20 November 1944 and a knight of the Légion d'Honneur. A square-and-park are named after him and his brother Alexandre (also a member of the resistance) in the 16th arrondissement of Paris (see image).

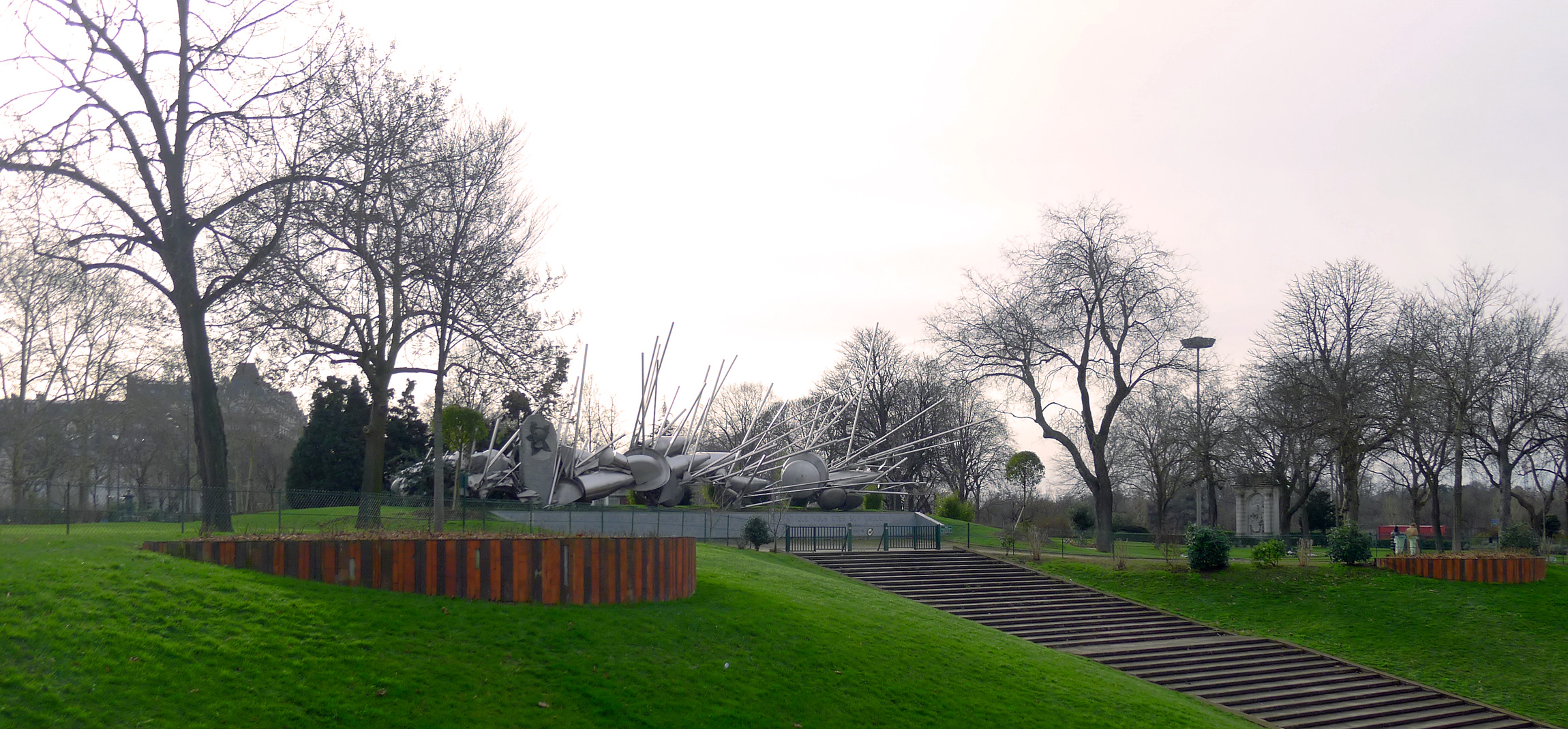
Square Alexandre-et-René Parodi, 16th arrondissement of Paris

Parodi, both as a resister and a magistrate, became the symbol and legitimising martyr of the judicial resistance in occupied France, at a time when the judiciary was later questioned for its collaboration and support for the Vichy regime. Following a tradition begun in the 1980s, the 2014 class promotion of new justice auditors from the École nationale de la magistrature chose to pay homage to him by "baptising" themselves with his name thus: René Parodi est le symbole de la résistance judiciaire française. (“René Parodi is the symbol of French judicial resistance”).

He was the father of the magistrate Claude Parodi.
