= Mont Lyall (Kerguelen) =

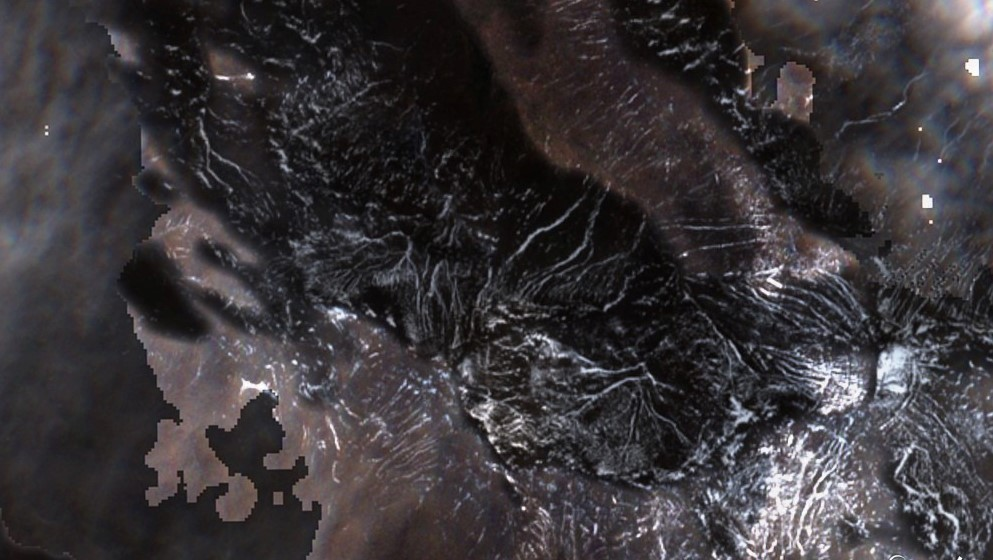
- Mont Lyall Sentinel-2 picture

Highest point
- Elevation: 747 m (2,451 ft)
- Coordinates: 49°14′03″S 69°56′17″E

Geography
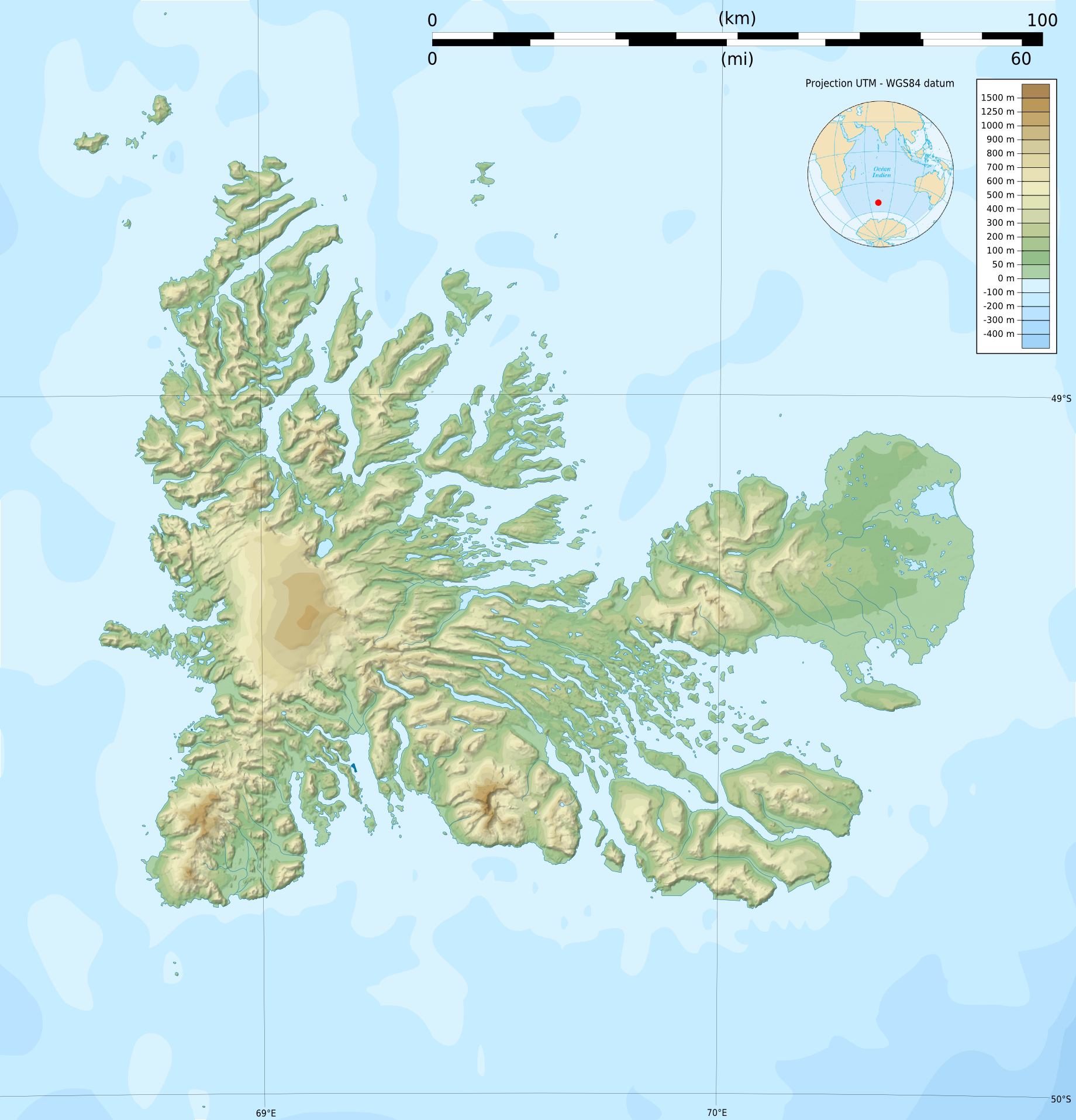
- Location within Kerguelen
- Location: Kerguelen Islands, French Southern and Antarctic Lands

Climbing
- First ascent: Unknown

Mont Lyall is a mountain in the French Southern and Antarctic Lands. Located on the Courbet Peninsula, Grande Terre, Kerguelen Islands, it rises to a height of 747 metres (2,451 ft) above sea level.

== History ==
This mountain was named in 1874 during the Challenger expedition after David Lyall, the Assistant Surgeon on board HMS Terror who was in charge of the botanical collections.

Edgar Aubert de la Rüe, who explored this area in February 1952, described Mont Lyall as an "outstanding and unmistakable mountain, being crowned by a kind of castle keep topped by two rocky needles resembling ridge turrets."

== See also ==
- Mont Crozier
