= Ronarc'h Peninsula =

Peninsula on the island of Kerguelen

Presqu'île Ronarc'h
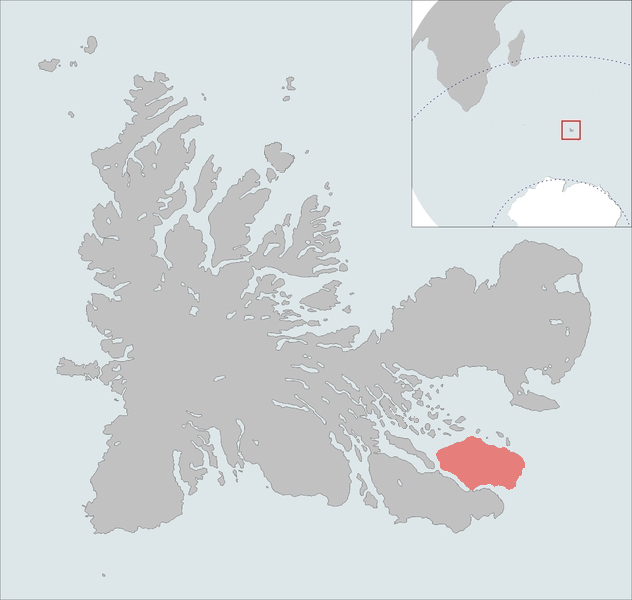
- Location of the Ronarc'h Peninsula in Kerguelen.

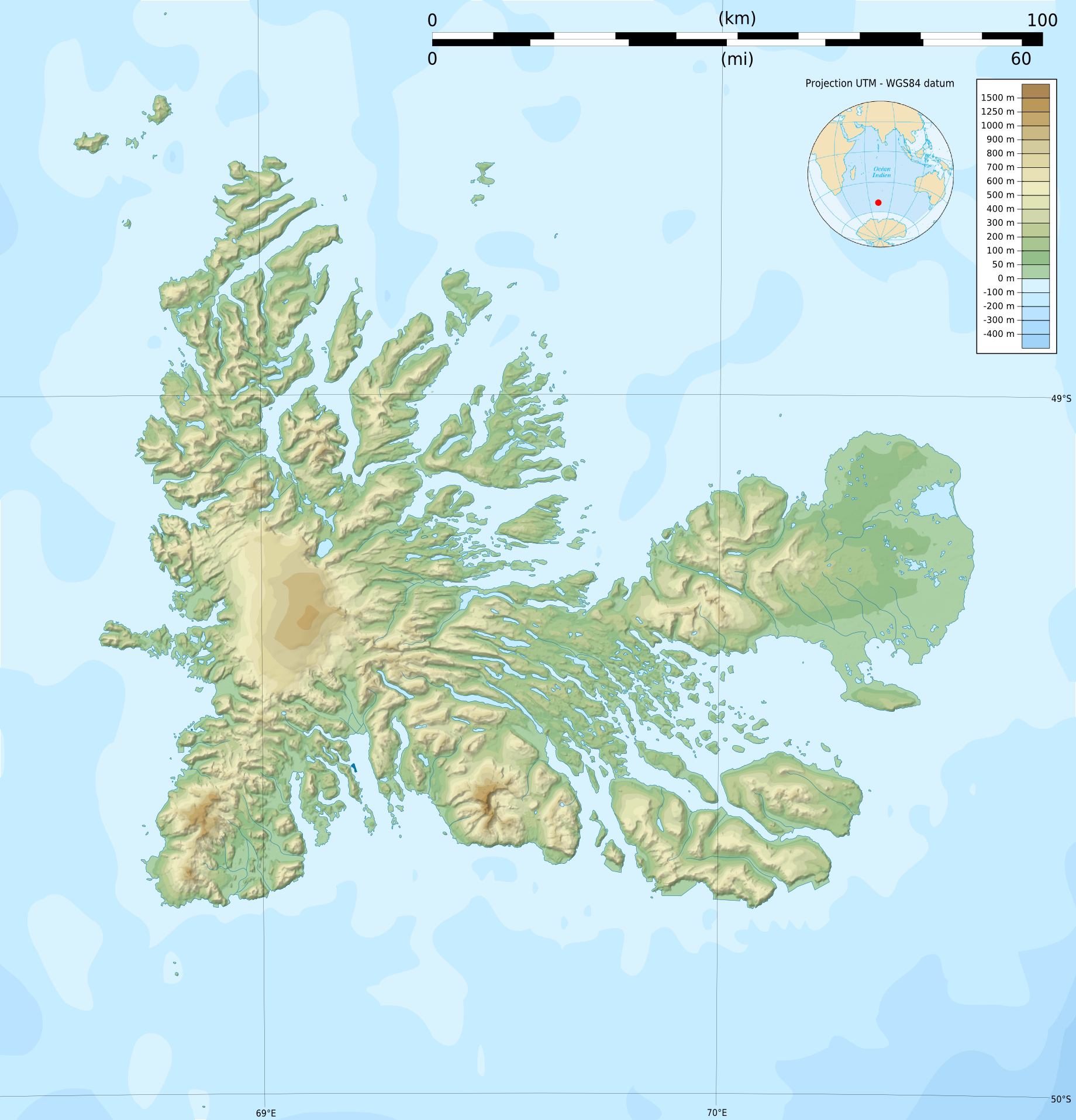
- Location within Kerguelen

Geography
- Location: Grande Terre, Kerguelen Islands
- Coordinates: 49°34′00″S 70°10′00″E
- Adjacent to: Golfe du Morbihan; Baie Greenland
- Length: 23 km (14.3 mi)
- Width: 17 km (10.6 mi)
- Highest elevation: 937 m (3074 ft)
- Highest point: Mont Wyville Thomson

Administration
- France
- French Southern and Antarctic Lands

Demographics
- Population: 0

Ronarc'h Peninsula (French: Presqu'île Ronarc'h) is a peninsula in the south-east of the main island of Kerguelen, a subantarctic island in the French Southern and Antarctic Lands of the southern Indian Ocean.

The peninsula was named after French Admiral Pierre Ronarc'h.

== Geography ==
The Ronarc'h Peninsula is connected by a narrow isthmus with the Jeanne d'Arc Peninsula to the southwest, which is approximately twice its area. It forms the southern limit of the Golfe du Morbihan. The Courbet Peninsula and Prince de Galles Peninsula are on the northern side of the gulf. The strait between the Ronarc'h Peninsula and the Prince de Galles Peninsula is known as the Royal Passage. The strait between the peninsula and Longue Island was named "Prince Albert Pass" after Prince Albert I of Monaco in 1961. The highest point of the peninsula is 937 metres (3,074 ft) high Mont Wyville Thomson located roughly in the middle. Another important peak is Pouce, a 744 metres (2,441 ft) high volcanic plug.The small research station Port-Douzième and Phonolite are located on the peninsula.

The Ronarc'h Peninsula was first named in 1922 by the French explorer Raymond Rallier du Baty after Admiral Pierre Alexis Ronarc'h, whom had commanded the Brigade de Fusiliers Marins during the First World War. The peninsula has two Hydrous xenolith outcrops called Le Trièdre and Val Phonolite. As well as one phlogopite megacryst outcrop on it called Tête de l'Homme. The Ronarc'h Peninsula was featured on a La Poste 2022 issue of a stamp to commemorate the centenary of Prince Albert's death.

== See also ==
- Toponymy of the Kerguelen Islands
