= Joseph Récamier =

French gynecologist

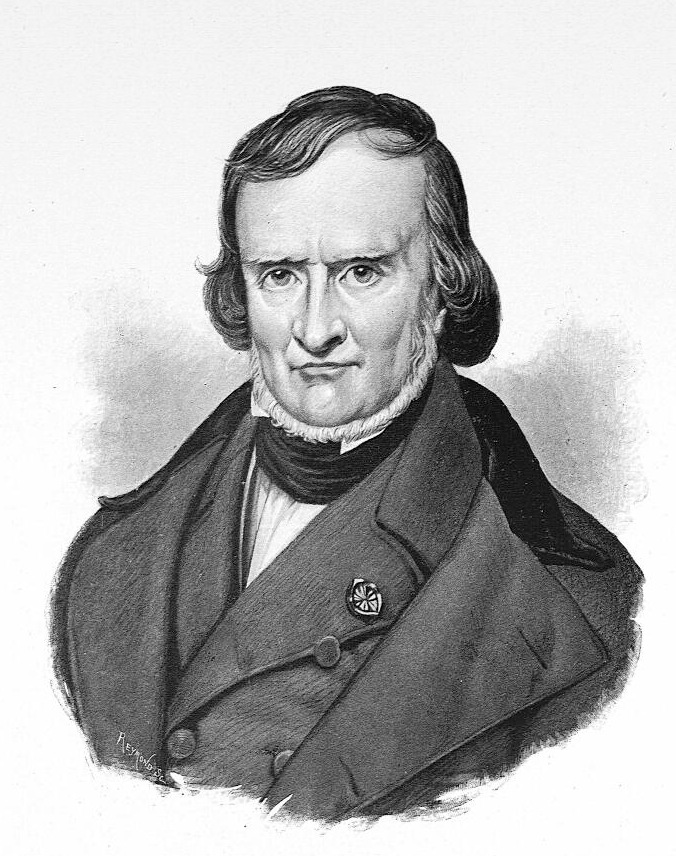
Joseph Récamier

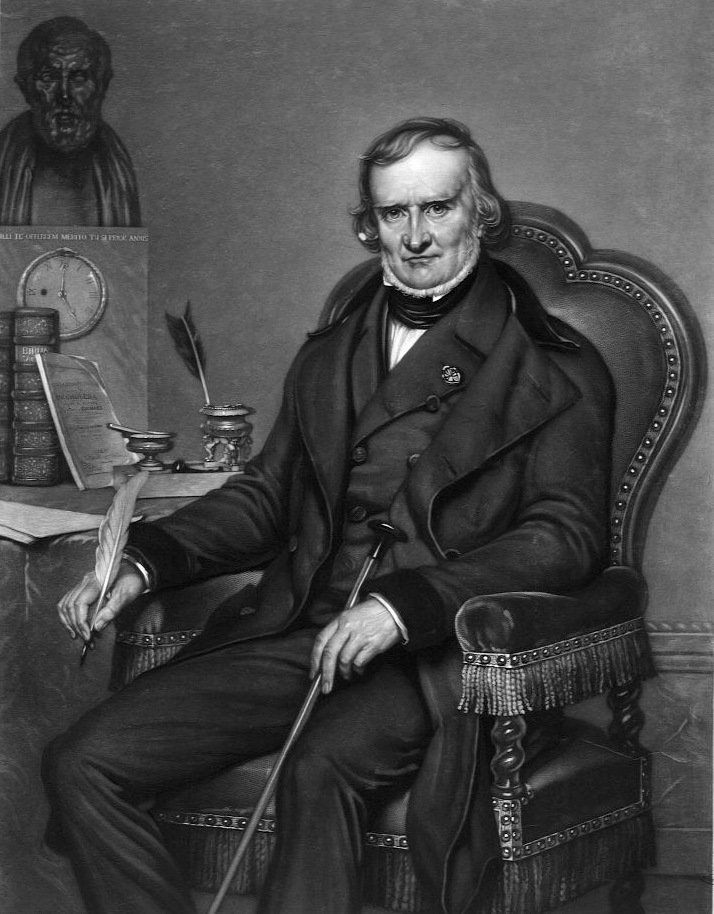
Joseph Récamier

Joseph-Claude-Anthelme Récamier (6 November 1774 – 28 June 1852) was a French gynecologist.

He was born in Cressin-Rochefort, Ain. For much of his professional career he was associated with the Hôtel-Dieu de Paris, where in 1806 he became chief physician. He was also a professor at the Collège de France and a member of the Faculté de médecine.

Récamier is credited with the popularization of several instruments in gynecological medicine, including the curette, the vaginal speculum, and the uterine sound. In his 1829 treatise Recherches sur le traitement du cancer, he coined the term "metastasis" as a definition for the spread of cancer.

"Récamier's operation" is a term used for curettage of the uterus.

== Selected writings ==
- Recherches sur le traitement du cancer (Research on Treatment of Cancer); 1829.
- Recherches sur le traitement du cholera-morbus (Research on Treatment of Cholera); 1832.

== Honors ==
Mont Docteur Récamier, the highest point of the Joffre Peninsula in Kerguelen was named by cartographer Raymond Rallier du Baty in his honor.
