= Lac Marville =

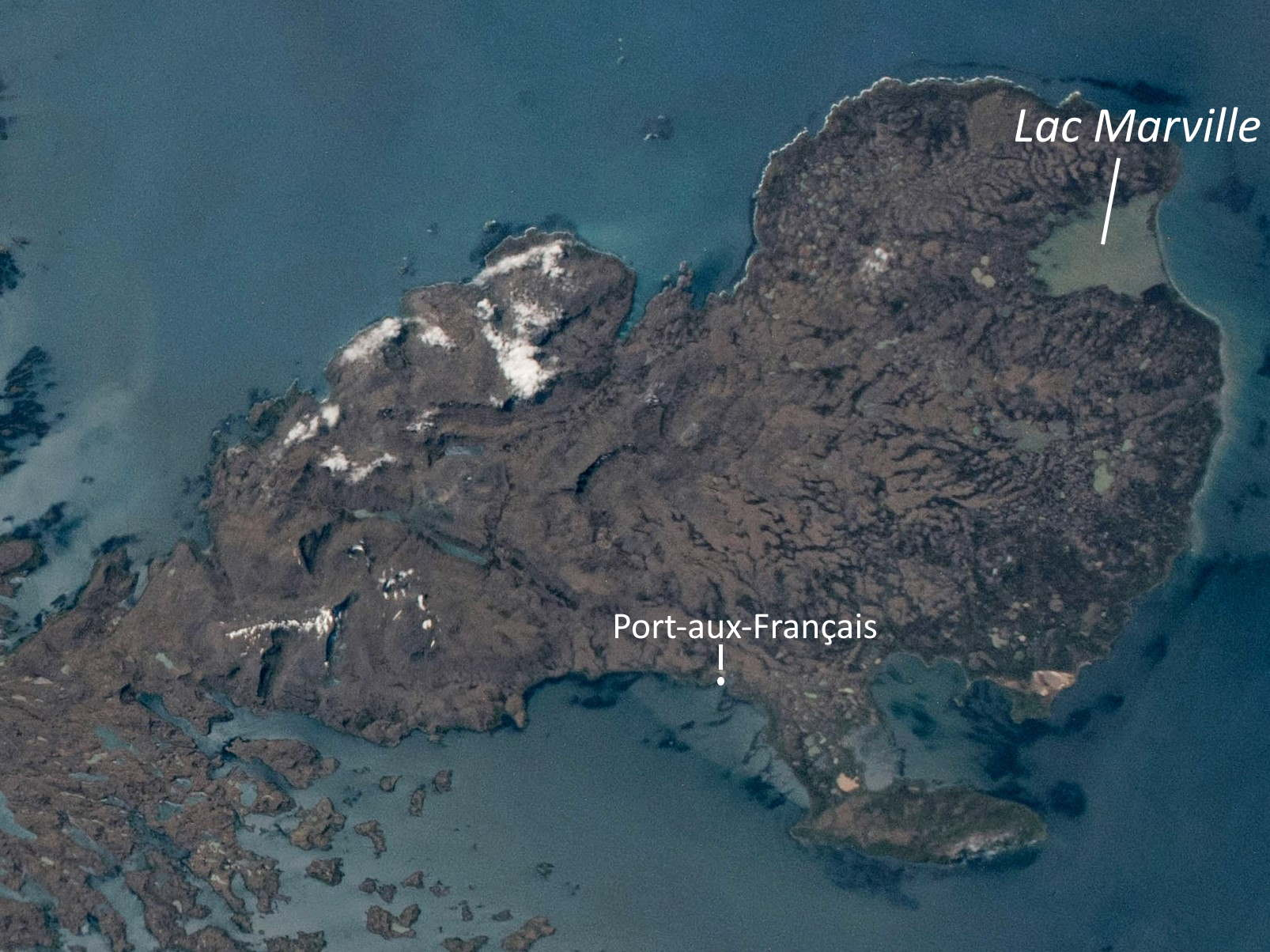
- Satellite image (2020/01/07) of Courbet peninsula with Lac Marville to the northeast.

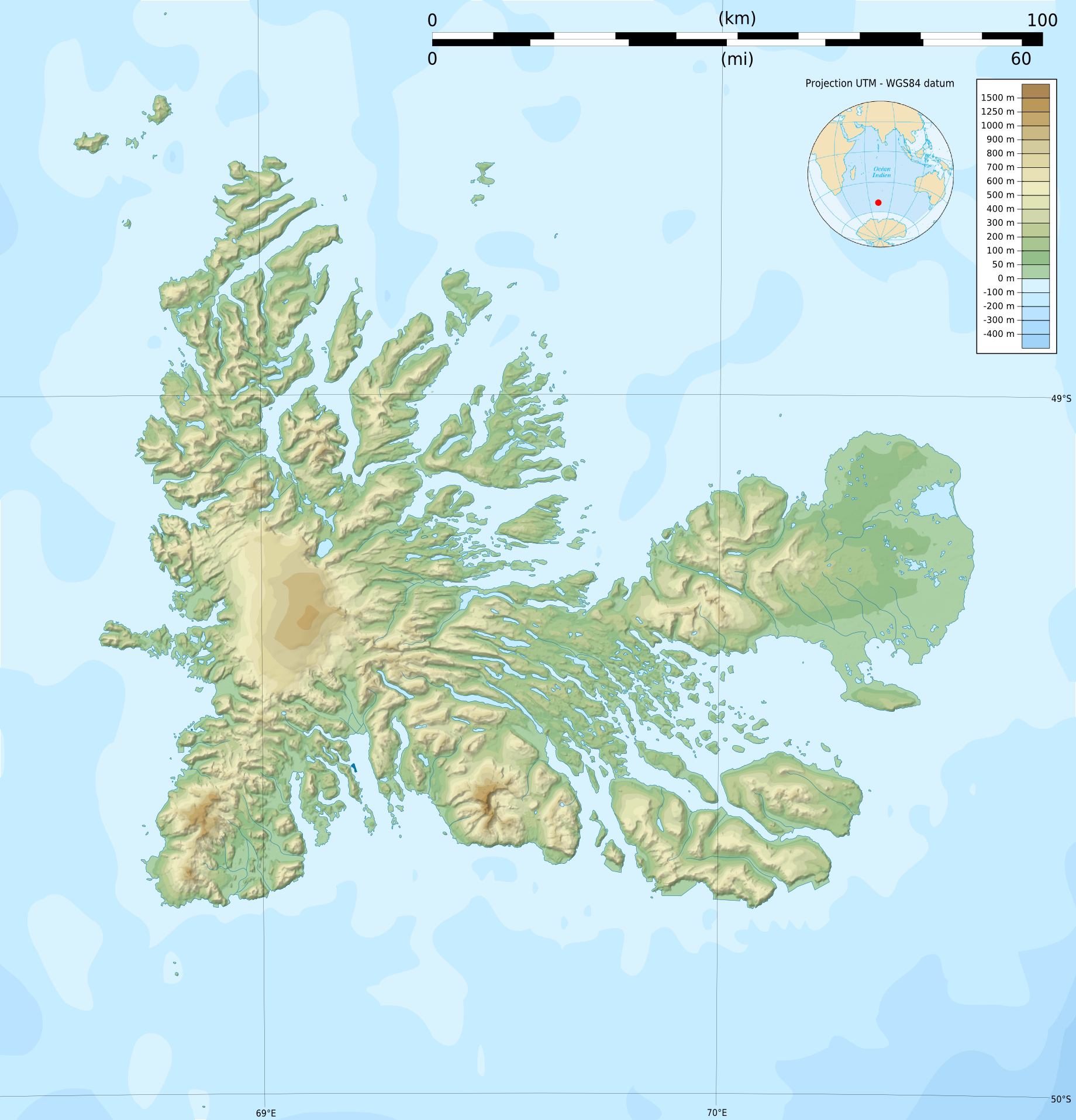
- Location within Kerguelen Location within Indian Ocean
- Location: Courbet Peninsula; Kerguelen islands
- Coordinates: 49°09′S 70°28′E
- Type: Lagoon
- Primary inflows: Rivière de l'Est (Kerguelen)
- Primary outflows: Indian Ocean
- Catchment area: 250 km^{2} (97 sq mi)
- Basin countries: French Southern Territories
- Max. length: 6.5 km (4.0 mi)
- Max. width: 5.25 km (3.26 mi)
- Surface area: 27 km^{2} (10 sq mi)
- Surface elevation: 1 m (3.3 ft)
- Settlements: Port-aux-Français (27 km (17 mi) away)

Lac Marville (French pronunciation: [lak maʁvil]) is a lagoon in the Kerguelen islands, part of the French Southern and Antarctic Lands. Extending over approximately 27 km^{2} (10 sq mi), it is the largest lake in the archipelago and one of the largest in France.

Its drainage basin covers about 250 km^{2} (97 sq mi).

== Location ==
Lac Marville is located on Grande-Terre, the archipelago's main island, along the northeastern shore of the Courbet Peninsula, between Cape Sandwich to the south and Cape Digby to the north.

It was patently known to whalers as early as the 19th century, for Captain Joseph J. Fuller in his memoirs described a large lake, at the back of the Royal Bay, the circumference of which was about 15 miles. However, no mention of the lake appeared on charts until the 1930s.

== Toponymy ==
This great lake was first officially mentioned by Edgar Aubert de la Rüe when he reported on his expeditions to Kerguelen in 1928–1929 and 1931. He chose the name of Marville without publishing the reasons.

== Hydrology ==
Lac Marville is shallow and the surface of the water body is approximately 1 m (3 ft 3 in) above sea level. Its area of 27 km^{2} (10 sq mi) is quite similar to that of Loch Morar (Scotland). It is the largest lake in the Kerguelen islands, far ahead of lakes Bontemps or d'Entr'Aigues whose surface areas are about 6.3 km^{2} (2.4 sq mi).

It is a coastal lake, actually a former lagoon separated from the Indian Ocean by a spit, 5 km (3.1 mi) long and 100 m (330 ft) to 500 m (1,600 ft) wide.

Lac Marville is about as long 6.5 km (4.0 mi) as it is wide 5.25 km (3.26 mi); it thus differs from most of the great lakes of the Kerguelen which have an elongated shape, constrained by the steep-sided morphology of the valleys.

Seven islets dot the lake. The largest hardly exceeds 7 ha (17 acres).

Even before the lake was mapped, navigators (especially those of the Challenger expedition in 1874), had pointed out at the northern entrance of the outlet a remarkable green hillock, the "Morne Vert".

Lac Marville is mainly fed by the Rivière de l'Est which originates at the foot of Mont Courbet and Delta Peak in the western mountains of the Courbet peninsula. At the mouth with the lake, 24 km (15 mi) downstream, the river bed widens to reach more than 150 m (490 ft). Many waterflows complete this contribution, descending from the Azorella's hills or from the Hautes Mares to the north and from Mount Peeper to the south. The lake's watershed, the largest in the Kerguelen archipelago on par with that of the system formed by the Clarée and the Rivière des Galets, covers an area of 250 km^{2} (97 sq mi).

A short outlet flows into the ocean across the coastline along the back beach towards the south.

Freshwater contains 120 mg/L (4.3×10^{−6} lb/cu in) of dissolved salts with a high proportion of chlorides due to marine influence.

== Ecology ==
Like the whole of the eastern plain of the Courbet peninsula, many peat bogs occupy the edges of the lake.

No native fish live in the lakes and rivers of the Kerguelen. At the end of the 1950s, salmonids were deliberately introduced in the archipelago. Brown trout (Salmo trutta), in particular those released into the Rivière du Château, colonized the entire drainage system of the peninsula thanks to their marine migratory form. Their arrival in Lac Marville occurred between 1982 and 1992.

A green freshwater algae species belonging to the genus Pediastrum, (Pediastrum marvillense), was first described in Lac Marville.

== Geology ==
The formation of the lake seems linked to the closure of a former marine gulf.

The bottom is made up of fine quaternary deposits, clayey-sandy, of fluvio-glacial origin.
