= Trapeza =

Trapeza ("τράπεζα") is a Greek word meaning table or stand, which in Greek can mean a bank or money-changer. It may refer to:

- Trapeza, Achaea, a village in Diakopto, Achaea, Greece
- Trapeza, Crete, a Minoan site
- Trapeza, Cyprus a village in Northern Cyprus
- In Eastern Orthodox monasteries, the refectory

== See also ==
- Trapeze (disambiguation)
