= List of lakes of the Kerguelen Islands =

This is a list of lakes in the Kerguelen Islands, a group of subantarctic islands belonging to France in the southern Indian Ocean.

Name	Location	Coordinates	Elevation	Size	Depth
Lac Aglaé	Main Island	49°13′47″S 69°16′25″E	220 metres (720 ft)	5 sq km	50m
Lac Alicia	Australia Island	49°28′39″S 69°53′30″E	10 metres (33 ft) ||		
Lac d'Argoat	Central Plateau, Main Island	49°28′49″S 69°43′12″E	10 metres (33 ft) ||		
Lac d'Armor	Central Plateau, Main Island	49°27′17″S 69°42′28″E	1 metre (3.3 ft) ||		
Lac d'Asté	Joffre Presque-isle, Main Island	49°04′55″S 69°32′00″E	31 metres (102 ft)		
Lac Aval	Courbet Peninsula, Main Island	49°15′19″S 69°57′48″E	67 metres (220 ft)		
Lac Bontemps	Main Island	49°17′41″S 69°27′11″E	5 metres (16 ft)		
Lac Börgen	Rallier du Baty Peninsula, Main Island	49°31′22″S 69°06′16″E	24 metres (79 ft)		
Lac de la Botte	Joffre Presque-isle, Main Island	49°03′20″S 69°34′55″E	30 metres (98 ft)		
Lac du Bouchet	Central Plateau, Main Island	49°22′33″S 69°13′47″E	240 metres (790 ft)		
Lac Brunehilde	Central Plateau, Main Island	49°23′50″S 69°25′50″E	40 metres (130 ft)		
Lac de Chamonix	Main Island	49°13′10″S 69°08′30″E	120 metres (390 ft)		
Lac Christiane	Courbet Peninsula, Main Island	49°20′32″S 69°57′04″E	367 metres (1,204 ft)		
Lac Chun	Central Plateau, Main Island	49°20′46″S 69°41′38″E	180 metres (590 ft)		
Lac de Courmayeur	Central Plateau, Main Island	49°20′46″S 69°29′36″E	164 metres (538 ft)		
Lac de Cristal	Joffre Presque-isle, Main Island	49°03′24″S 69°33′09″E	48 metres (157 ft)		
Lac de la Croix du Sud	Main Island	49°13′12″S 69°23′22″E	36 metres (118 ft)		
Lac de la Déception	Central Plateau, Main Island	49°25′13″S 69°39′07″E	200 metres (660 ft)		
Lac des Deux Îlots	Central Plateau, Main Island	49°21′30″S 69°33′00″E	153 metres (502 ft)		
Lac Eaton	Gauss Presque-isle, Main Island	49°23′35″S 69°53′35″E	33 metres (108 ft)		
Lac Elsa	Central Plateau, Main Island	49°19′32″S 69°32′46″E	102 metres (335 ft)		
Lac Emmy	Central Plateau, Main Island	49°20′31″S 69°35′13″E	74 metres (243 ft)		
Lac d'Entr'Aigues	Central Plateau, Main Island	49°26′18″S 69°27′42″E	92 metres (302 ft)		
Lac d'Enfer	Central Plateau, Main Island	49°29′14″S 69°41′59″E	40 metres (130 ft)		
Lacs d'Entremont	Gallieni Peninsula, Main Island	49°28′53″S 69°28′29″E	178 metres (584 ft)		
Lac Euphrosine	Main Island	49°14′05″S 69°23′40″E	−1 metre (−3.3 ft)		
Lac des Fougères	Central Plateau, Main Island	49°25′32″S 69°40′36″E	92 metres (302 ft)		
Lac Francine	Central Plateau, Main Island	49°21′25″S 69°20′53″E	386 metres (1,266 ft)		
Lac Gandillot	Central Plateau, Main Island	49°30′00″S 69°45′55″E	38 metres (125 ft)		
Lac de Guilvinec	Central Plateau, Main Island	49°23′47″S 69°42′53″E	35 metres (115 ft)		
Lac Hanna	Central Plateau, Main Island	49°18′52″S 69°30′49″E	280 metres (920 ft)		
Lac d'Hermance	Central Plateau, Main Island	49°27′18″S 69°34′34″E	13 metres (43 ft)		
Lac Hervé	Loranchet Peninsula, Main Island	48°52′53″S 68°50′01″E	29 metres (95 ft)		
Lac de l'Impasse	Rallier du Baty Peninsula, Main Island	49°31′34″S 68°51′38″E	20 metres (66 ft)		
Lac Isou	Loranchet Peninsula, Main Island	49°00′25″S 68°50′36″E	181 metres (594 ft)		
Lac des Jaspes	Courbet Peninsula, Main Island	49°18′05″S 69°57′50″E	478 metres (1,568 ft)		
Lac Jaune	Main Island	49°27′37″S 69°08′35″E	9 metres (30 ft)		
Lac Josette	Central Plateau, Main Island	49°18′52″S 69°18′35″E	159 metres (522 ft)		
Lac de Jougne	Gallieni Peninsula, Main Island	49°31′31″S 69°21′43″E	74 metres (243 ft)		
Lac Koeslin	Central Plateau, Main Island	49°24′16″S 69°36′15″E	57 metres (187 ft)		
Lac des Korrigans	Gauss Presque-isle, Main Island	49°21′35″S 69°47′30″E	78 metres (256 ft)		
Lac Lancelot	Central Plateau, Main Island	49°28′00″S 69°40′12″E	45 metres (148 ft)		
Lac de la Malchance	Loranchet Peninsula, Main Island	49°02′35″S 68°51′50″E	178 metres (584 ft)		
Lac Margot	Courbet Peninsula, Main Island	49°15′19″S 69°57′48″E	67 metres (220 ft)		
Lac Marioz	Central Plateau, Main Island	49°25′28″S 69°18′04″E	99 metres (325 ft)		
Lac Marville	Courbet Peninsula, Main Island	48°08′59″S 70°28′20″E	1 metre (3.3 ft)		
Lac des Megalestris	Gallieni Peninsula, Main Island	49°33′10″S 69°16′15″E	19 metres (62 ft)		
Lac Mercure	Gauss Presque-isle, Main Island	49°23′16″S 69°50′42″E	67 metres (220 ft)		
Lac Michèle	Loranchet Peninsula, Main Island	48°59′45″S 68°57′39″E	110 metres (360 ft)		
Lac Nathalie	Rallier du Baty Peninsula, Main Island	49°31′00″S 69°08′52″E	67 metres (220 ft)		
Lac Noir	Central Plateau, Main Island	49°29′06″S 69°43′45″E	17 metres (56 ft)		
Lac Parsifal	Central Plateau, Main Island	49°25′43″S 69°36′50″E	126 metres (413 ft)		
Lac du Présalé	Joffre Presque-isle, Main Island	49°01′46″S 69°32′16″E	−2 metres (−6.6 ft)		
Lac de la Réserve	Rallier du Baty Peninsula, Main Island	49°26′10″S 68°57′00″E	30 metres (98 ft)		
Lac Saturne	Gauss Presque-isle, Main Island	49°22′50″S 69°46′55″E	77 metres (253 ft)		
Lac des Saumons	Courbet Peninsula, Main Island	49°15′30″S 69°59′00″E	68 metres (223 ft)		
Lac Schimper	Central Plateau, Main Island	49°20′38″S 69°40′29″E	163 metres (535 ft)		
Lac Sibélius	Central Plateau, Main Island	49°23′42″S 69°32′29″E	72 metres (236 ft)		
Lac de la Source	Courbet Peninsula, Main Island	49°19′02″S 69°57′36″E	428 metres (1,404 ft)		
Lac Supérieur	Courbet Peninsula, Main Island	49°16′45″S 70°02′06″E	68 metres (223 ft)		
Lac Thalie	Main Island	49°13′55″S 69°19′45″E	124 metres (407 ft)		
Lac Tristan	Central Plateau, Main Island	49°22′14″S 69°32′11″E	34 metres (112 ft)		
Lac Toulaz	Central Plateau, Main Island	49°24′10″S 69°30′37″E	143 metres (469 ft)		
Lac des Trois Cantons	Loranchet Peninsula, Main Island	48°57′40″S 69°02′57″E	25 metres (82 ft)		
Lac des Trois Glaciers	Central Plateau, Main Island	49°22′16″S 69°19′02″E	326 metres (1,070 ft)		
Lac des Trois Enseignes	Courbet Peninsula, Main Island	49°19′27″S 69°49′31″E	246 metres (807 ft)		
Trois Lacs	Courbet Peninsula, Main Island	49°19′52″S 69°57′05″E	430 metres (1,410 ft)		
Lac des Truites	Courbet Peninsula, Main Island	49°15′50″S 70°00′00″E	68 metres (223 ft)		
Lac Valérie	Loranchet Peninsula, Main Island	48°52′22″S 68°52′19″E	50 metres (160 ft)		
Lac du Val Mort	Main Island	49°17′02″S 68°52′36″E	13 metres (43 ft)		
Lac de la Vendéenne	Gallieni Peninsula, Main Island	49°35′21″S 69°39′34″E	541 metres (1,775 ft)		
Lac Yseult	Central Plateau, Main Island	49°22′38″S 69°34′40″E	541 metres (1,775 ft)		
Lac Zizi	Loranchet Peninsula, Main Island	49°08′15″S 68°51′45″E	445 metres (1,460 ft)		
