= Le Pouce (disambiguation) =

Le Pouce may refer to:

- Le Pouce, a mountain in Mauritius
- Le Pouce (Kerguelen)
- Le Pouce (sculpture), an outdoor sculpture in La Défense by César Baldaccini.
