= Baleiniers Gulf =

Gulf on Grande Terre in Antarctica

- Golfe des Baleiniers
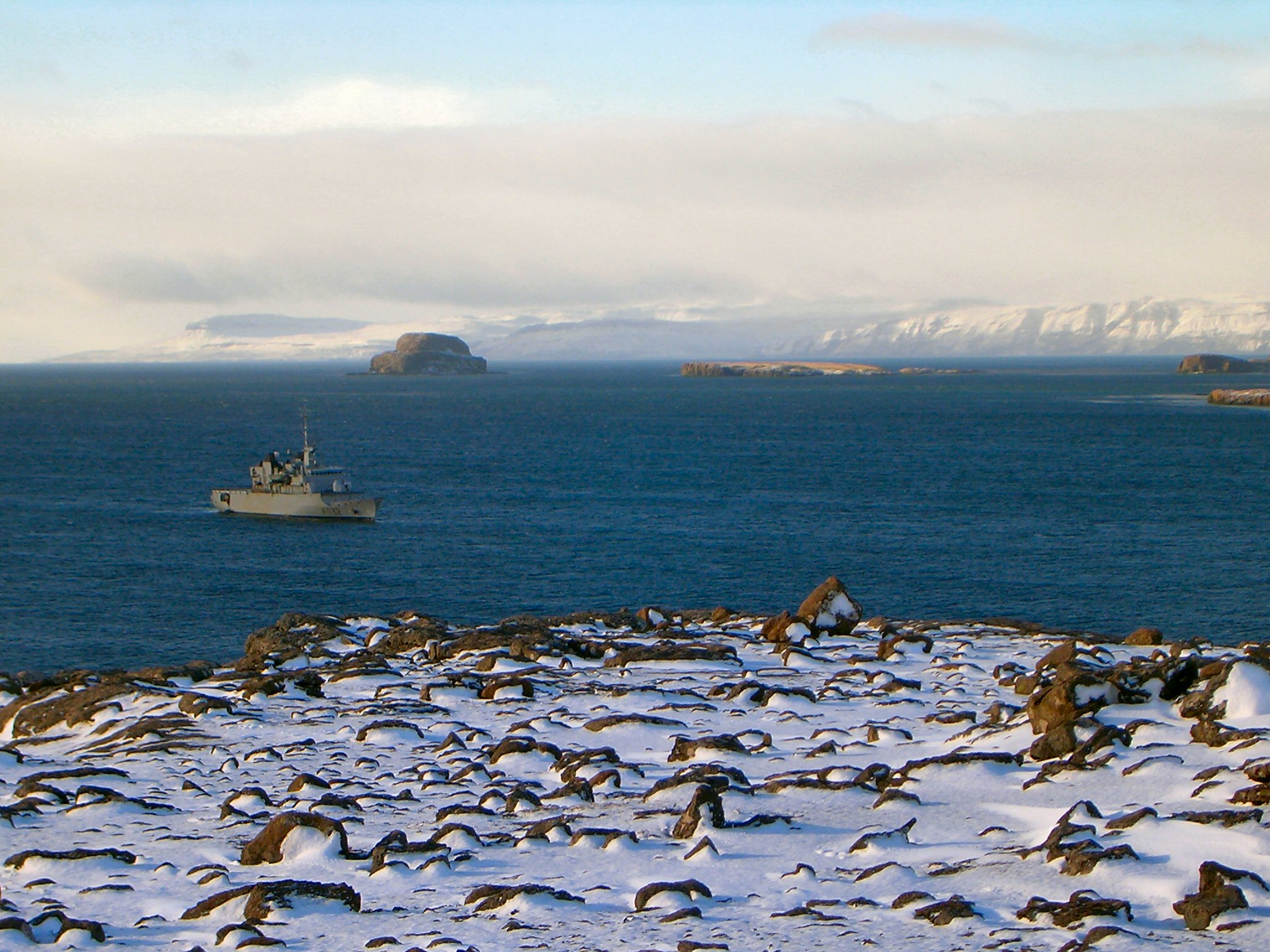
- Panorama of the gulf
- Interactive map of Baleiniers Gulf
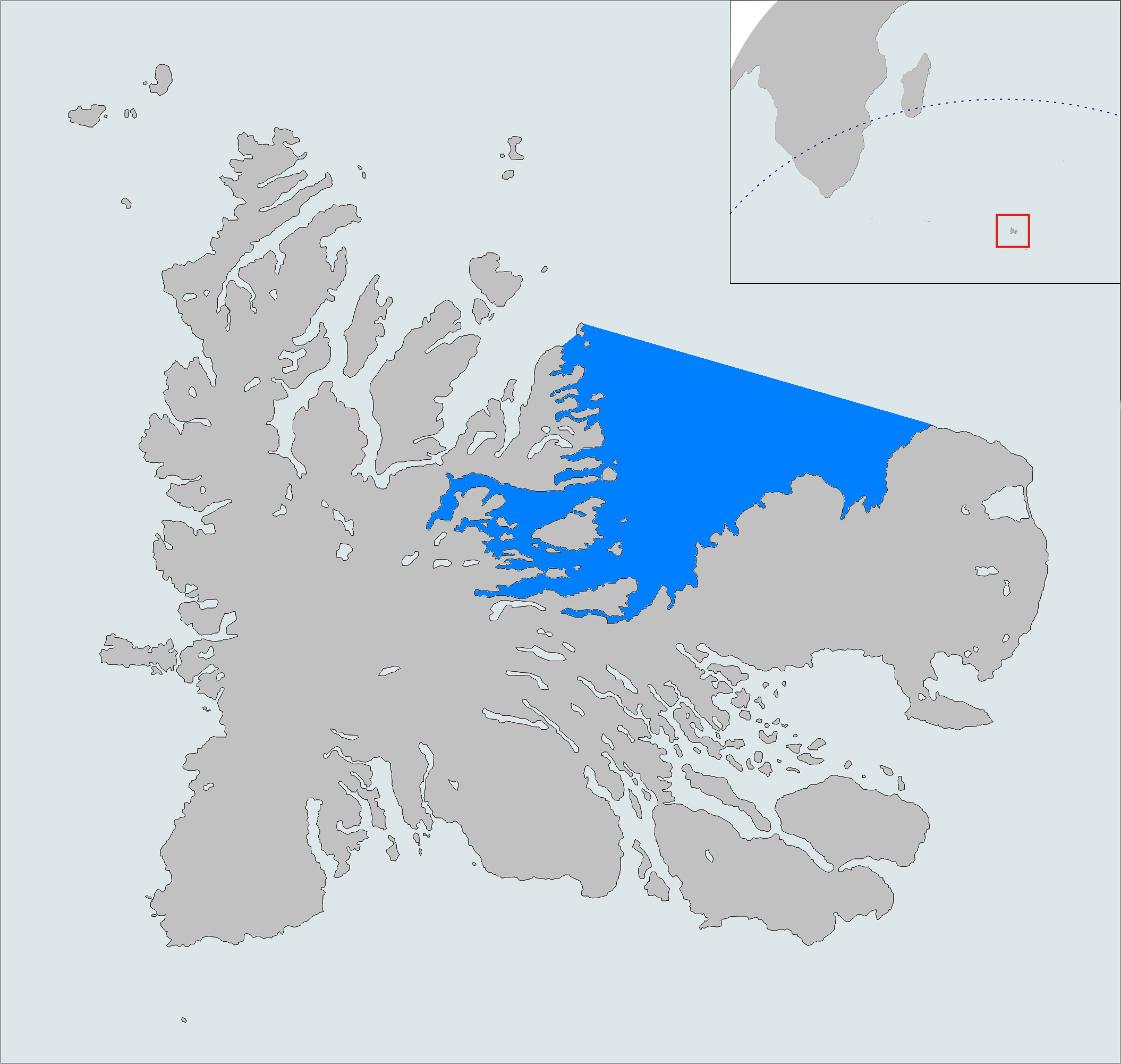
- Location in Kerguelen
- Location: French Southern and Antarctic Lands
- Coordinates: 49°06′S 69°51′E
- Ocean/sea sources: Indian Ocean
- Max. length: 37 km (23 mi)
- Max. width: 54 km (34 mi)
- Settlements: Port-Couvreux (abandoned)

Baleiniers Gulf (French: Golfe des Baleiniers) is a gulf or large bay in the northeastern shore of Grande Terre, Kerguelen, French Southern and Antarctic Lands.

== Geography ==
The gulf is located in the northern coastal zone of Kerguelen and opens towards the northeast, between the Joffre Peninsula to the west and the Courbet Peninsula to the east. It is roughly 37 km (23 mi) long and 54 km (34 mi) wide. The 340-metre (1,120 ft) high Île du Port is located in the inner part of the gulf.

== History ==
The Baleiniers Gulf was named in 1913 or 1914 by Raymond Rallier du Baty. It first appeared on the map in 1922. The name Golfe des Baleiniers, meaning "Whalers Gulf", originated in the fact that it was an important centre for whalers in the past.

In 1776, Captain James Cook had written the following about this gulf:

In an intervening bay of great extent, an immense quantity of the large sea-weed called fucus giganteus was observed: some of the plants were judged to be above 60 fathoms long.

== See also ==
- Toponymy of the Kerguelen Islands
