= Baie Norvégienne =

Bay of the Kerguelen Islands

Coordinates: 49°23′S 70°22′E

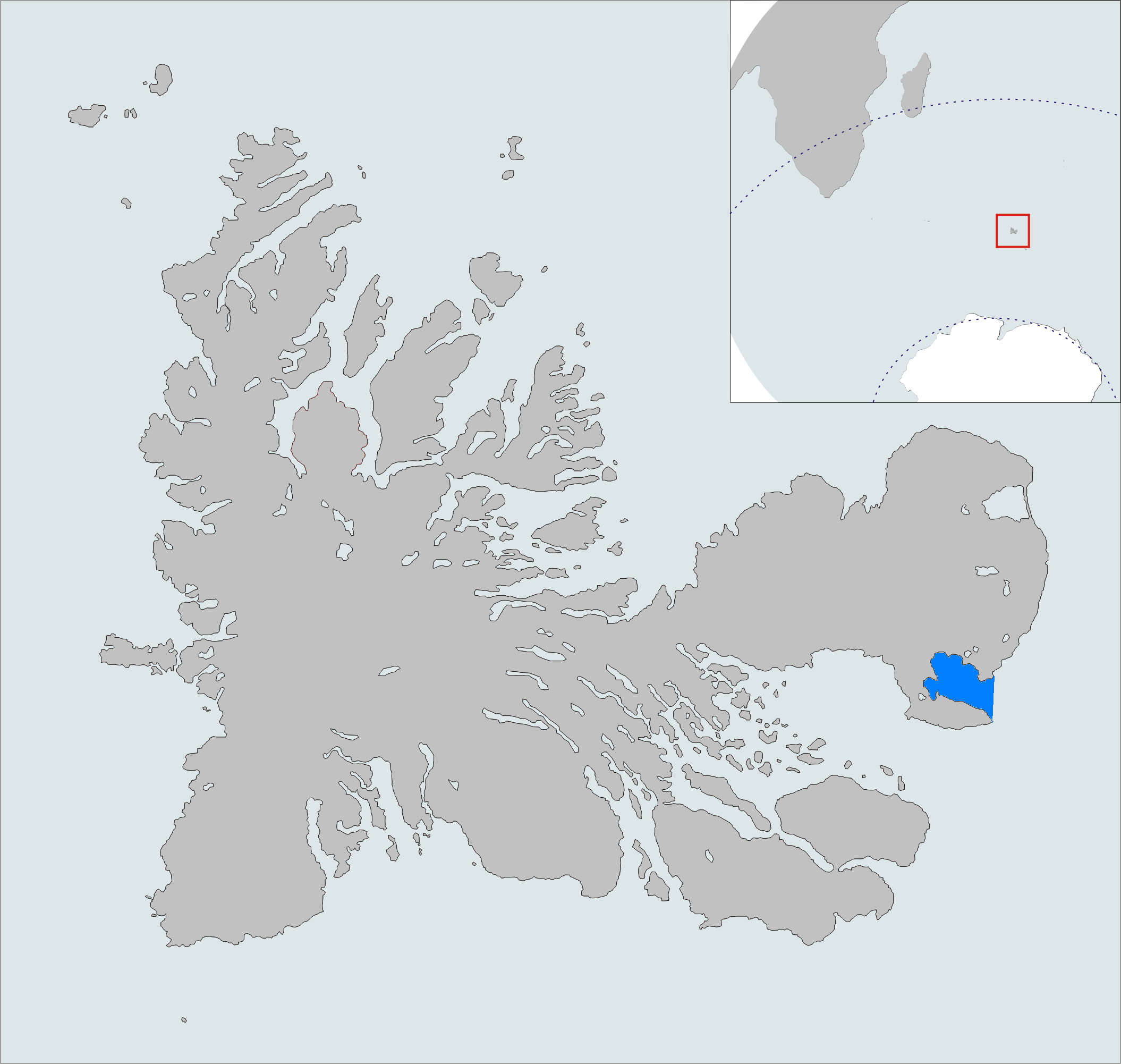
Location of Baie Norvégienne, Kerguelen Islands

Baie Norvégienne (French pronunciation: [bɛ nɔʁveʒjɛn], lit. 'Norwegian Bay') is a small bay to the southeast of the Péninsule Courbet, a vast peninsula constituting the northeast quarter of the Kerguelen Islands in the Indian Ocean.

The southern part of the bay is the northern coast of Prince de Galles Peninsula, a short, southeast extension of Cap Suzanne. The western part digs as for it the Eastern coast of the peninsula which slips by towards Cap Ratmanoff, more in the north.

In Baie Norvégienne, there is a small tidal island named Matley Island. It is the site of the grave of John Matley, who died on Kerguelen on 12 December 1810. He was the captain of the British sealing ship Duke of Portland. Duke of Portland Captain James Clarke Spence visited the island again in 1811–1812. Spence brought with him a gravestone which Matley's widow had had made, and placed it on Matley's grave.
