= Duke of Portland (1794 ship) =

British whaler, convict transport, and merchantman 1794–1811

History

France
- Launched: 1790, Bordeaux, France
- Fate: Captured 1794

Great Britain
- Name: Duke of Portland
- Namesake: William Cavendish-Bentinck, 3rd Duke of Portland
- Owner: 1794-97: Unknown; 1797 on:Daniel Bennett
- Acquired: 1794-5 by purchase of a prize
- Fate: Last listed 1811
- Notes: Two decks and three masts

General characteristics
- Tons burthen: 523 (bm)
- Length: 113 ft 0 in (34.4 m)
- Beam: 32 ft 9 in (10.0 m)
- Propulsion: Sail
- Complement: 1801:40; 1804:44; 1805:40
- Armament: 1797: 22 × 6-pounder guns; 1801: 18 × 9&6-pounder guns; 1804: 18 × 9&6-pounder guns; 1805: 18 × 9&6-pounder guns

Duke of Portland was a sailing ship built in 1790 at Bordeaux, France. The British Royal Navy captured her in 1794 after the outbreak of the French Revolutionary Wars. British owners named her Duke of Portland and employed her as a whaler. As such she made some eleven whaling voyages. On the outbound leg of her eighth voyage she transported convicts to Port Jackson, New South Wales. She was last listed in 1811.

== British career ==
In 1794 the British captured the ship that would become Duke of Portland.

Duke of Portland first appears in Lloyd's Register in 1797 in the supplemental pages.

Duke of Portland, Thomas Pittman, master, Daniel Bennett, owner, left Britain on 20 March 1797 on her first whaling voyage. She returned on 3 April 1798.

Pittman was still captain of Duke of Portland for her second whaling voyage. She left Britain on 25 June 1798 and returned on 27 August 1799.

Captain Ransom Jones was master on Duke of Portland's third whaling voyage. She left Britain on 20 November 1799 and returned on 27 March 1801.

Jones received a letter of marque for Duke of Portland on 17 July 1801. At the time of receiving the letter, Jones and Duke of Portland was already on her way on her fourth whaling voyage. She had left on 3 June 1801, and she returned on 7 September 1802, having stopped at St Helena on 21 May 1802.

Captain Stephen Matley sailed Duke of Portland on her fifth whaling voyage. She left Britain on 26 November 1802 and returned on 5 March 1804. On her return Matley received a letter of marque on 14 June.

However, it was Captain John Clarke Spence (or Spencer) who sailed Duke of Portland on her sixth whaling voyage. She left Britain on 29 May 1804 with the destination Isle of Desolation. She was reported to have been "all well" there in March 1805. She returned to Britain on 21 June 1805.

On his return Captain John Clarke Spence received a letter of marque on 22 July 1805. He sailed Duke of Portland again on her seventh whaling voyage, again to the Isle of Desolation. He left on 10 November 1805. and returned on 20 September 1806.

Duke of Portland sailed on 13 December 1806, or 19 February 1807 under the command of Captain John Spence, and in company with Lively and Ranger. The ships sailed with the India Fleet under the escort of HMS Antelope. The convoy parted when Duke of Portland made for Rio de Janeiro. She arrived at Sydney on 27 July 1807. Duke of Portland embarked 189 convicts, and disembarked 189, having lost none; other reports state that three convicts died on the voyage and that two died later.

Duke of Portland left Port Jackson on 7 or 10 November bound for England. She was carrying a cargo of oil, sealskins, and lumber. She returned to Britain on 19 April 1808.

On 14 July 1808, or 3 August 1808, Duke of Portland, Spence, master, sailed again from England, and arrived at Port Jackson again on 24 January 1809. This time she was carrying stores, not prisoners. (Note: Bateson lists Duke of Portland's second voyage among his list of convict voyages, but then does not show her as carrying any convicts.) She left for England in May. Apparently, she first visited Guadalupe Island, off the California coast and took on a cargo of seal oil and skins. She next put into at Honolulu in February 1810. Duke of Portland left on 4 March, having spent several weeks there. Before her departure, King Kamehameha I entrusted Spence with a letter to King George III and several gifts, which Spence delivered on his return to England. Duke of Portland sought cargoes and whales, but without success and she returned to England. She arrived there on 17 August 1810.

Duke of Portland is last listed in Lloyd's Register in 1808, still with Daniel Bennett as owner. There exist records that indicate that she made two more whaling voyages, both to the Island of Desolation. She left in September 1810 with John Matley as master. He died of natural causes on 12 December and his grave is on Matley Island, a small tidal island in Baie Norvégienne, in the Kerguelen Islands.

She then sailed again in 1811 with Spence as master. Spence brought with him a gravestone, which Matley's widow had had made, and placed it on Matley's grave.

Duke of Portland is last listed in the Register of Shipping in 1811 with J. Spence, master, D. Bennet, owner, and London-South Seas as trade.
