= Trapeze (disambiguation) =

A trapeze is a piece of equipment for performing aerial acrobatics.

It may also refer to:

- Trapeze (film), a 1956 movie directed by Carol Reed
- Trapeze (band), a 1970s UK rock band
  - Trapeze (1970 album), the band's debut album
  - Trapeze (1975 album), another eponymous album by the same band
- Trapeze (book), a 2012 novel by Simon Mawer, originally published as The Girl Who Fell from the Sky
- Trapeze (Prokofiev), a ballet by Prokofiev
- Trapeze (sailing), a wire on a sailing dinghy allowing members of the crew to lean out of the boat
- Trapeze (spreadsheet program), a discontinued spreadsheet program for classic MacOS computers
- Trapeze Software, a Toronto-based company specializing in software relating to public transit and paratransit systems
- Decompression trapeze, a device used in recreational diving
- Trapeze, the Oak Park and River Forest High School newspaper
- Trapeze or Kūchū Buranko, a Japanese short novel and associated works
- Trapeze, an imprint of Orion Publishing Group
- Trapeze dress, alternate term for A-line (clothing)
- Mont Trapèze, a mountain in Kerguelen, French Southern and Antarctic Lands

== See also ==
- Trapezoid or trapezium, a four-sided figure with at least one pair of parallel sides.
