= Joffre Peninsula =

Peninsula in France

Presqu'île Joffre
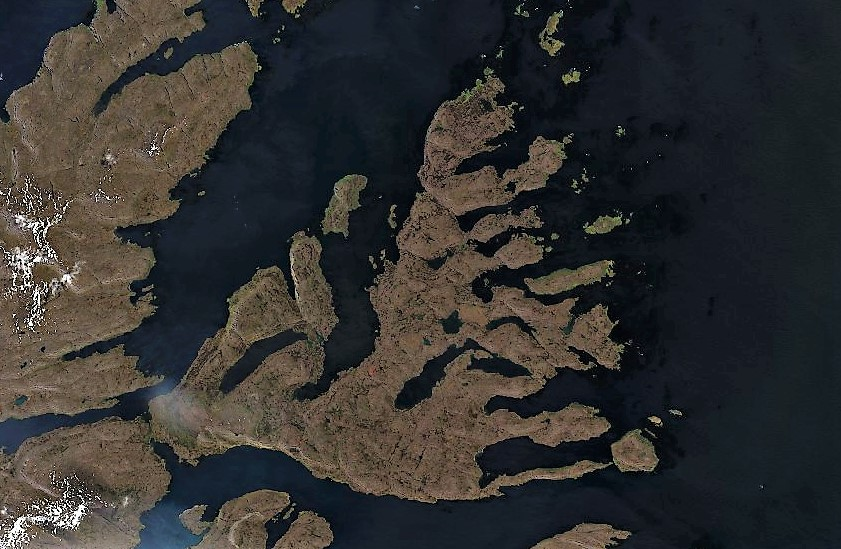
- Sentinel-2 picture of the peninsula.

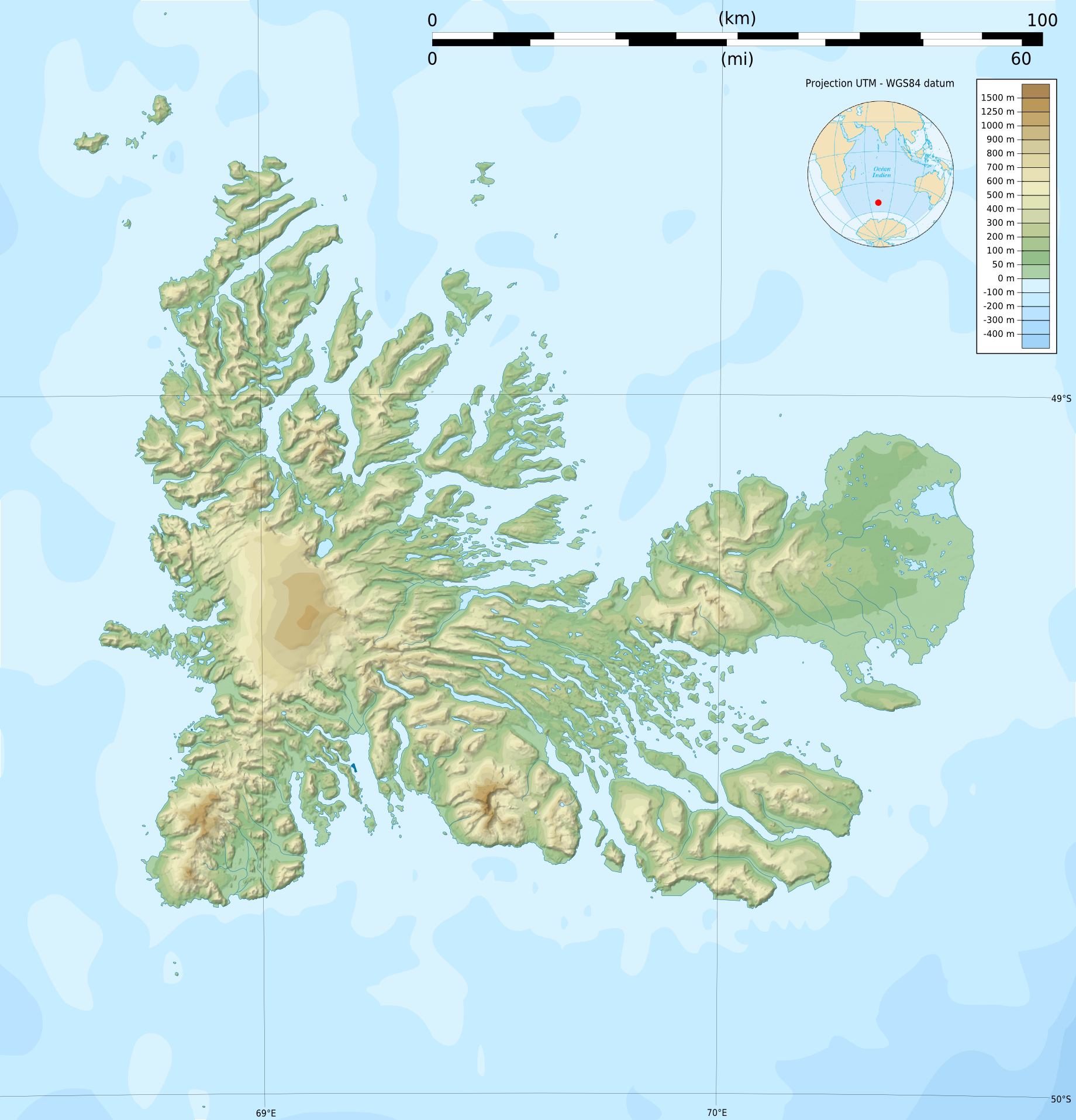
- Location within Kerguelen

Geography
- Location: Grande Terre, Kerguelen Islands
- Coordinates: 49°03′26″S 69°32′25″E
- Adjacent to: Baleiniers Gulf; Baie Rhodes
- Length: 24 km (14.9 mi)
- Width: 22 km (13.7 mi)
- Highest elevation: 451 m (1480 ft)
- Highest point: Mont Docteur Récamier

Administration
- France
- French Southern and Antarctic Lands

Demographics
- Population: 0

The Joffre Peninsula (French: Presqu'île Joffre) is a peninsula in the Kerguelen Islands, French Southern and Antarctic Lands.

It is located in the northern sector of Grande Terre, between the Baie Rhodes to the west, beyond which lies Île Foch, and the Baleiniers Gulf to the east, with the smaller Baie du Hillsborough to the south.

== History ==
The present name of the Joffre Peninsula was given by the French Naval Hydrographic and Oceanographic Service. Previously it had been named "Jeanne d'Arc Peninsula" by Raymond Rallier du Baty in 1922, and the peninsula now known as Jeanne d'Arc Peninsula was named Joffre Peninsula in honor of the Maréchal Joffre. However, owing to the proximity of the latter to Port Jeanne d'Arc, the Hydrographic Service decided to swap the names in 1937 to prevent confusing mariners in the future.

Initially, in 1874, the peninsula had been named Bismarck Halbinsel (Bismarck Peninsula) by the German scientists of the Gazelle expedition who visited Kerguelen to observe the transit of Venus.

Edgar Aubert de la Rüe visited the peninsula on 8 January 1929 and wrote: "I have rarely seen shores as craggy and sinister-looking as those fringing the southern limit of this peninsula."

== Geography ==
The peninsula has an extremely indented coast, with numerous deep bays and headlands. The isthmus is located in the southwest and is very narrow. The highest point is 451 metres (1,480 ft) high Mont Docteur Récamier, located at the southwestern end. A number of islands lie off the peninsula's shore. There are also a few sizeable lakes.

== See also ==
- Toponymy of the Kerguelen Islands
