= Mont Crozier =

Mountain in the French Kerguelen Islands

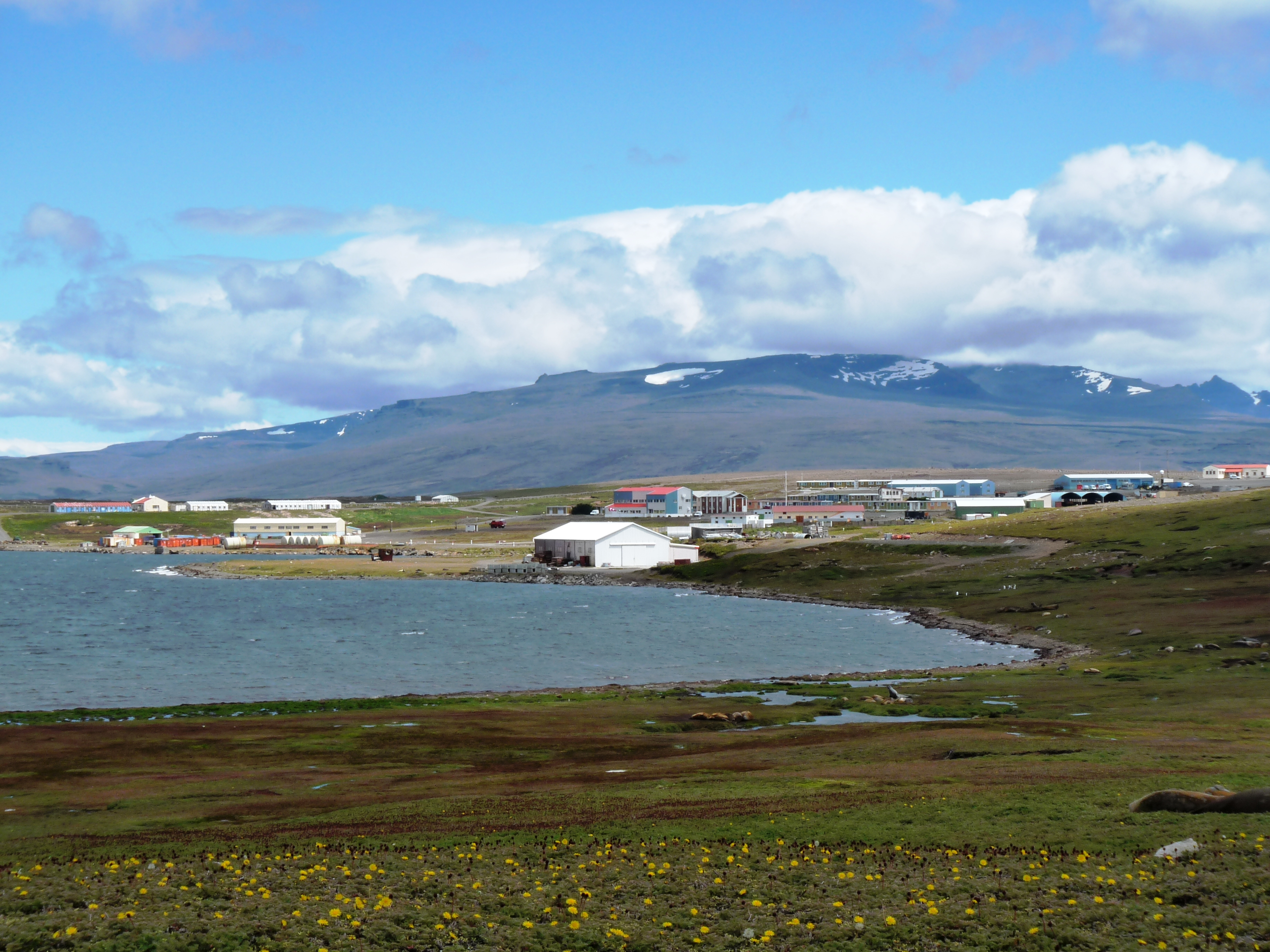
- Mont Crozier with the Port-aux-Français research station in the foreground

Highest point
- Elevation: 979 m (3,212 ft)
- Coordinates: 49°17′42″S 69°58′54″E

Geography

Mont Crozier (French pronunciation: [mɔ̃ kʁozje]) is a summit of the Kerguelen Archipelago, a group of volcanic islands in the southern Indian Ocean, southeast of Africa. Mont Crozier is located on the Courbet Peninsula of Grande Terre and rises to 979 metres (3,212 ft) above sea level.

== Geography ==
Mont Crozier is the highest point on the Courbet peninsula, situated in the west and overlooking the Port-aux-Francais research station. The hills and slopes of Mont Crozier consist of olivine basalt with thicknesses up to 1,000 m (3,300 ft).

== History ==
The summit was named in 1874 by members of the British Challenger expedition in honour of Francis Crozier, who had commanded HMS Terror during James Clark Ross' expedition to Antarctica (including the Kerguelen in 1840).

Theophil Studer and several of his companions attempted to ascend Mount Crozier in 1874 but gave up and turned back due to bad weather. It was Edgar Aubert de la Rüe and the Comorian Moilimou Zitoumbi who, in February 1952, reached the summit of Mont Crozier first.
