= Île du Port =

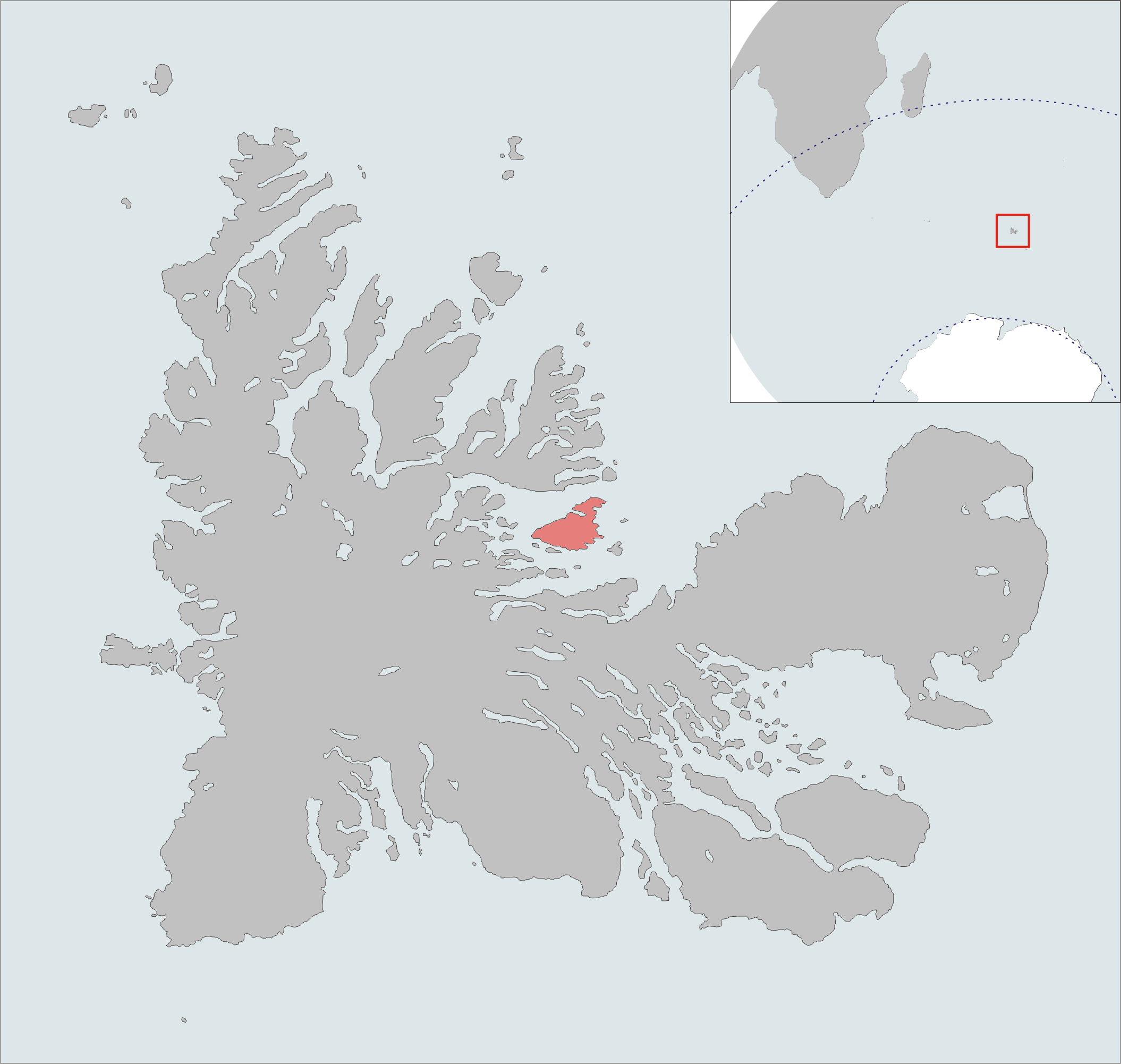
- The île du Port is highlighted on this Kerguelen Islands map.
- Interactive map of Île du Port

Geography
- Location: Indian Ocean
- Coordinates: 49°11′S 69°36′E
- Archipelago: Îles Kerguelen
- Total islands: 1
- Major islands: Île du Port
- Area: 43.0 km^{2} (16.6 sq mi)
- Area rank: 3rd(In the Kerguelen Islands)
- Length: 10 km (6 mi)
- Width: 14 km (8.7 mi)
- Coastline: 40 km (25 mi)
- Highest elevation: 340 m (1120 ft)
- Highest point: K13 volcano

Administration
- France
- District: Îles Kerguelen

Demographics
- Demonym: Porte
- Population: 0

Île du Port (French pronunciation: [il dy pɔʁ]) is one of the Kerguelen Islands in the southern Indian Ocean, situated in the Golfe des Baleiniers off the north coast of Grande Terre, the main island.

It is the fourth largest island in the archipelago (43 km^{2}). The highest point is an inactive volcano named K13, at 340 metres.
