= Mont Docteur Récamier =

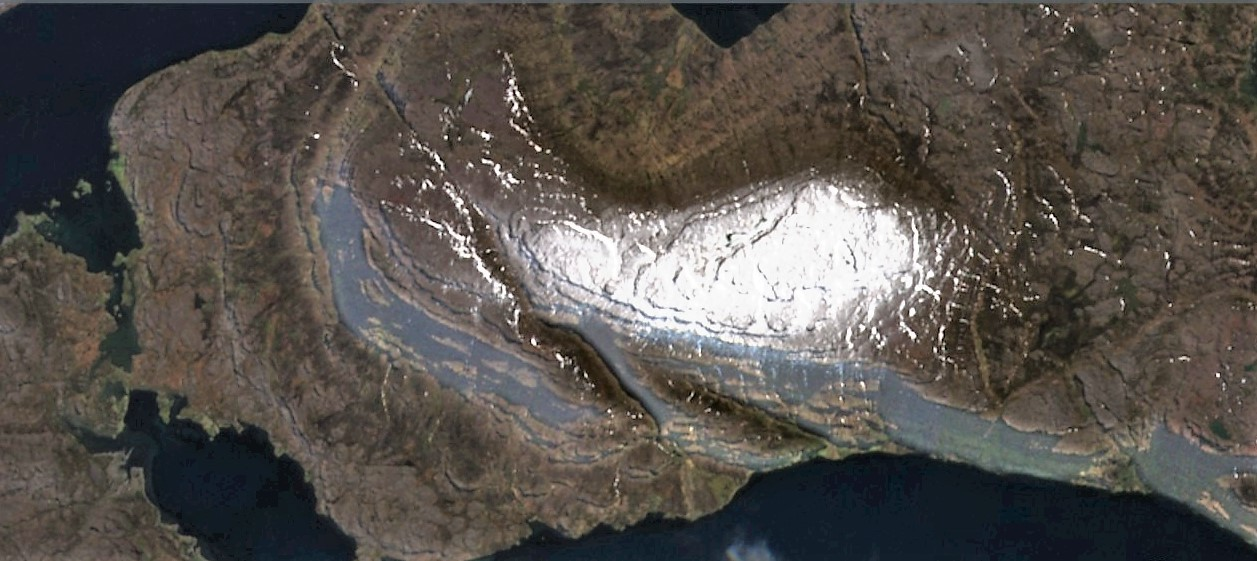
- Sentinel-2 picture centered on Mont Docteur Récamier covered with snow.

Highest point
- Elevation: 451 m (1,480 ft)
- Coordinates: 49°05′57″S 69°23′34″E

Geography
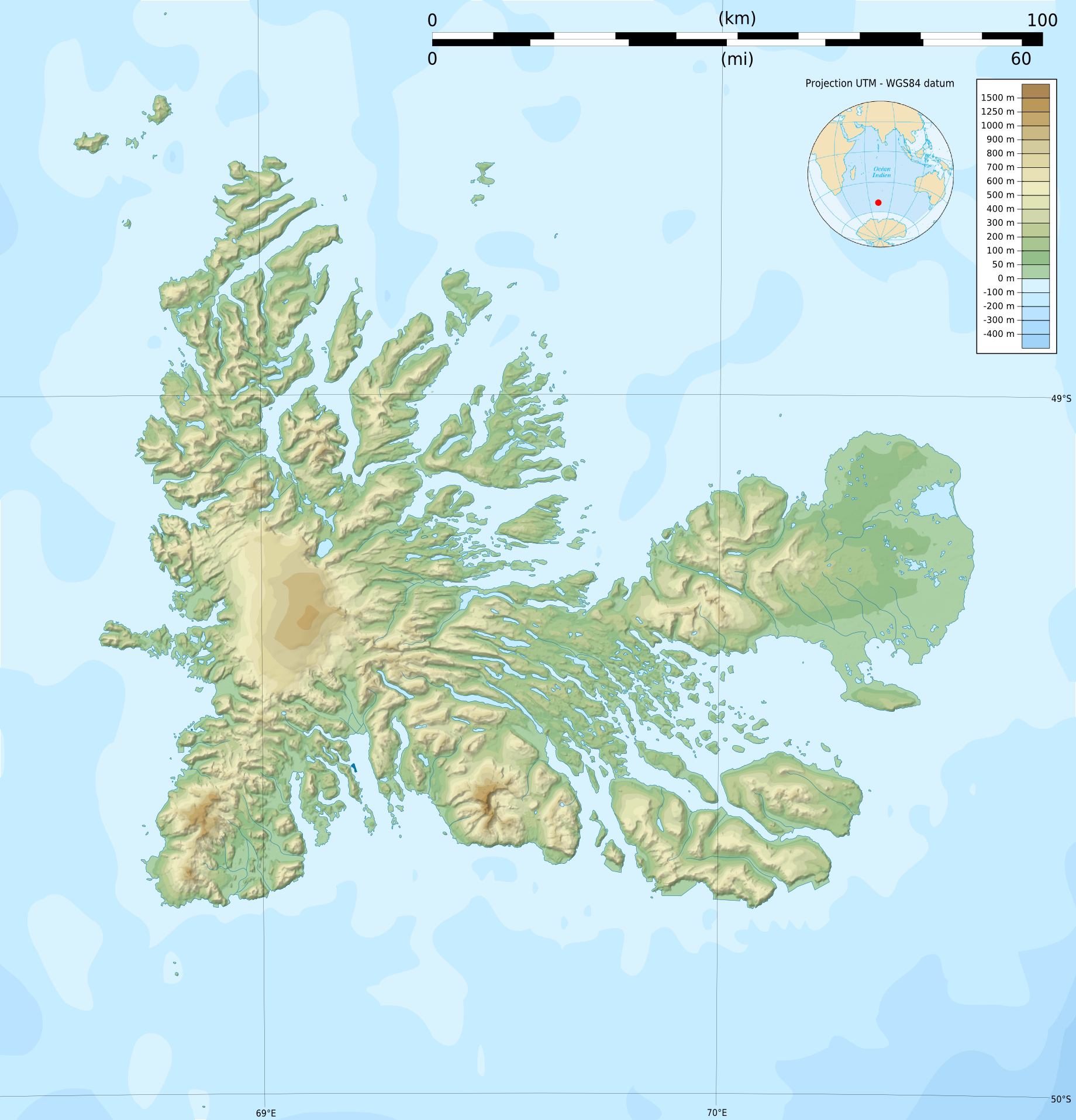
- Location within Kerguelen
- Location: Grande Terre, Kerguelen Islands, French Southern and Antarctic Lands

Climbing
- First ascent: Unknown

Mont Docteur Récamier (French pronunciation: [mɔ̃ dɔktœʁ ʁekamje]) is a mountain in the French Southern and Antarctic Lands. Located in the Joffre Peninsula, Kerguelen, it rises to a height of 451 metres (1,480 ft) above sea level.

Mont Docteur Récamier is the highest point of the Joffre Peninsula. It rises at the southwestern end, a little to the east of the narrow isthmus.

== History ==
This mountain was named in 1913 or 1914 by Raymond Rallier du Baty after Doctor Joseph Récamier, secretary and travel companion of Duke Philippe D'Orléans. It first appeared on the map in 1922.

== See also ==
- Toponymy of the Kerguelen Islands
