= Mont Wyville Thomson =

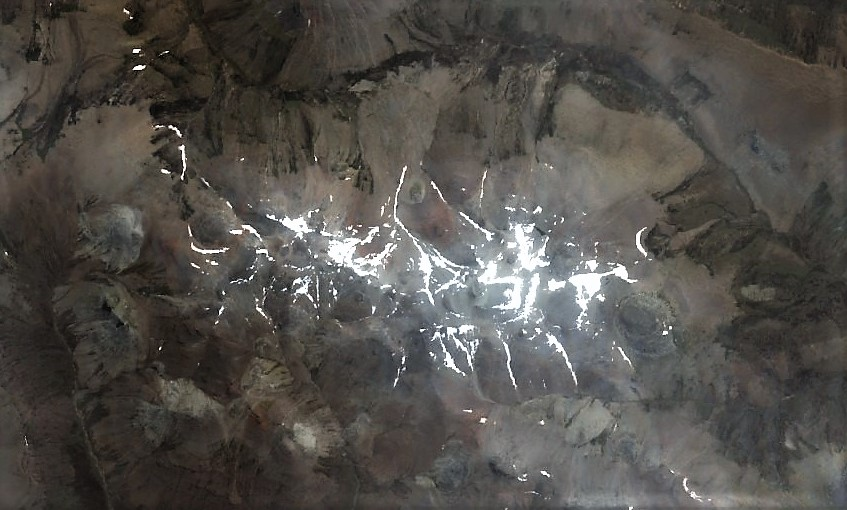
- Sentinel-2 picture centered on Mont Wyville Thomson

Highest point
- Elevation: 937 m (3,074 ft)
- Prominence: 887 m (2,910 ft)
- Coordinates: 49°34′26″S 70°10′16″E

Geography
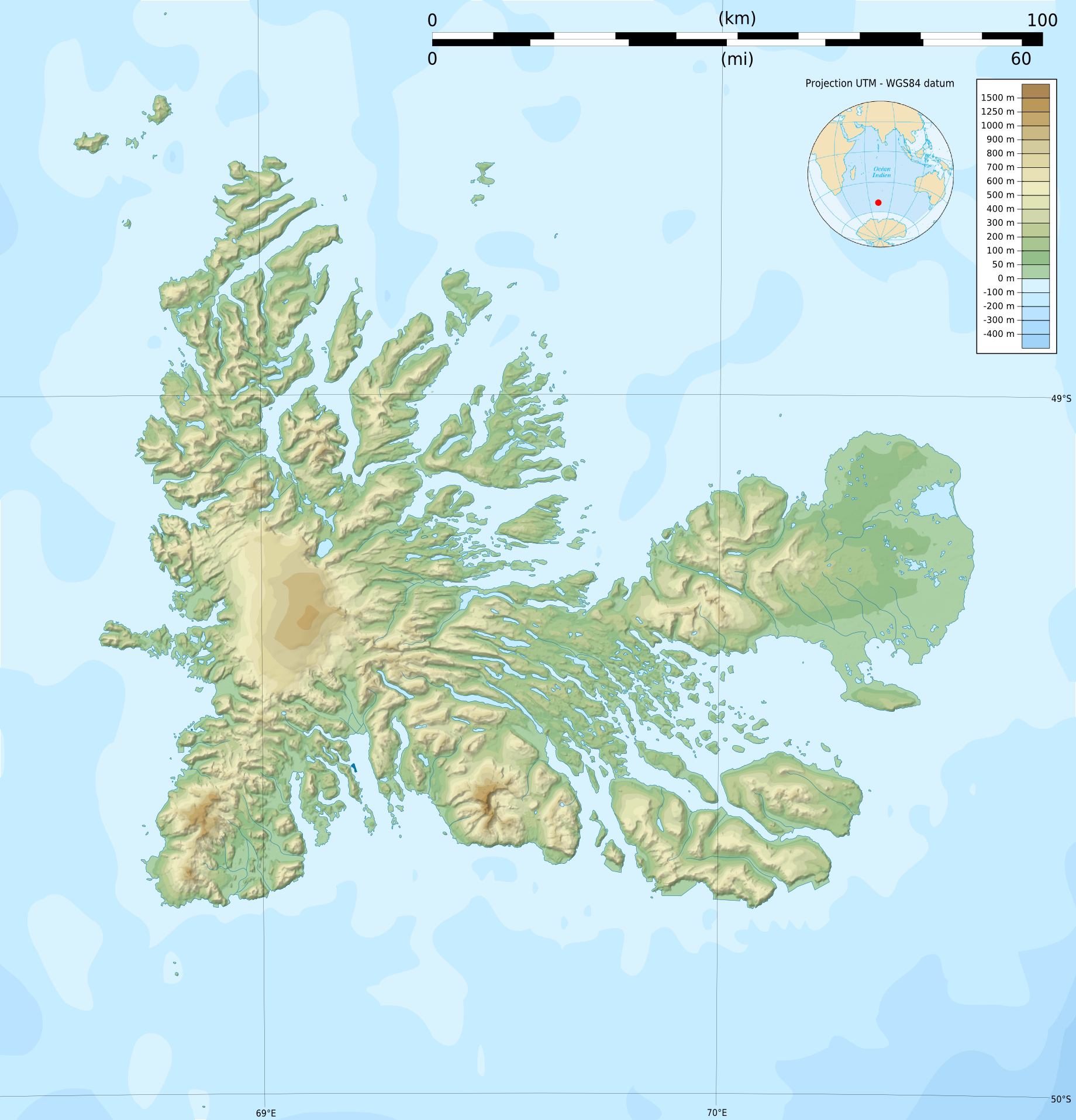
- Location within Kerguelen
- Location: Grande Terre, Kerguelen Islands, French Southern and Antarctic Lands

Climbing
- First ascent: Edgar Aubert de la Rüe; December 1946

Mont Wyville Thomson is a mountain in the French Southern and Antarctic Lands. Located in the Ronarc'h Peninsula, Kerguelen, it rises to a height of 937 metres (3,074 ft) above sea level.

Mont Wyville Thomson is the highest point of the Ronarc'h Peninsula. It rises almost in the centre.

== History ==
This mountain was named in 1874 after Charles Wyville Thomson, the chief scientist of the Challenger expedition.

Edgar Aubert de la Rüe climbed to the summit on Christmas Day 1949 with two traveling companions. He wrote:

From the ship we had assumed that the mountain slopes rose close to the shore. But actually there was a wide area of nasty, dangerously wobbly peat bogs separating us from the first escarpments. Following an initial steep climb [...] we were finally able to tackle the northern slopes [...]. They led us first to the threshold of an impact crater opening on the side of the mountain. [...] in the background, at an altitude of 570 metres (1,870 ft) there was a hidden dead-end lake, still almost entirely frozen. We then had to skirt around scree-covered escarpments, after which some large, hard-packed snowfields brought us without difficulty close to the summit. Only the very top of the mountain gave us some trouble owing to the thick, very slippery layer of frost encrusting the jumble of loose rocks

== See also ==
- Toponymy of the Kerguelen Islands
