= Mont Trapèze =

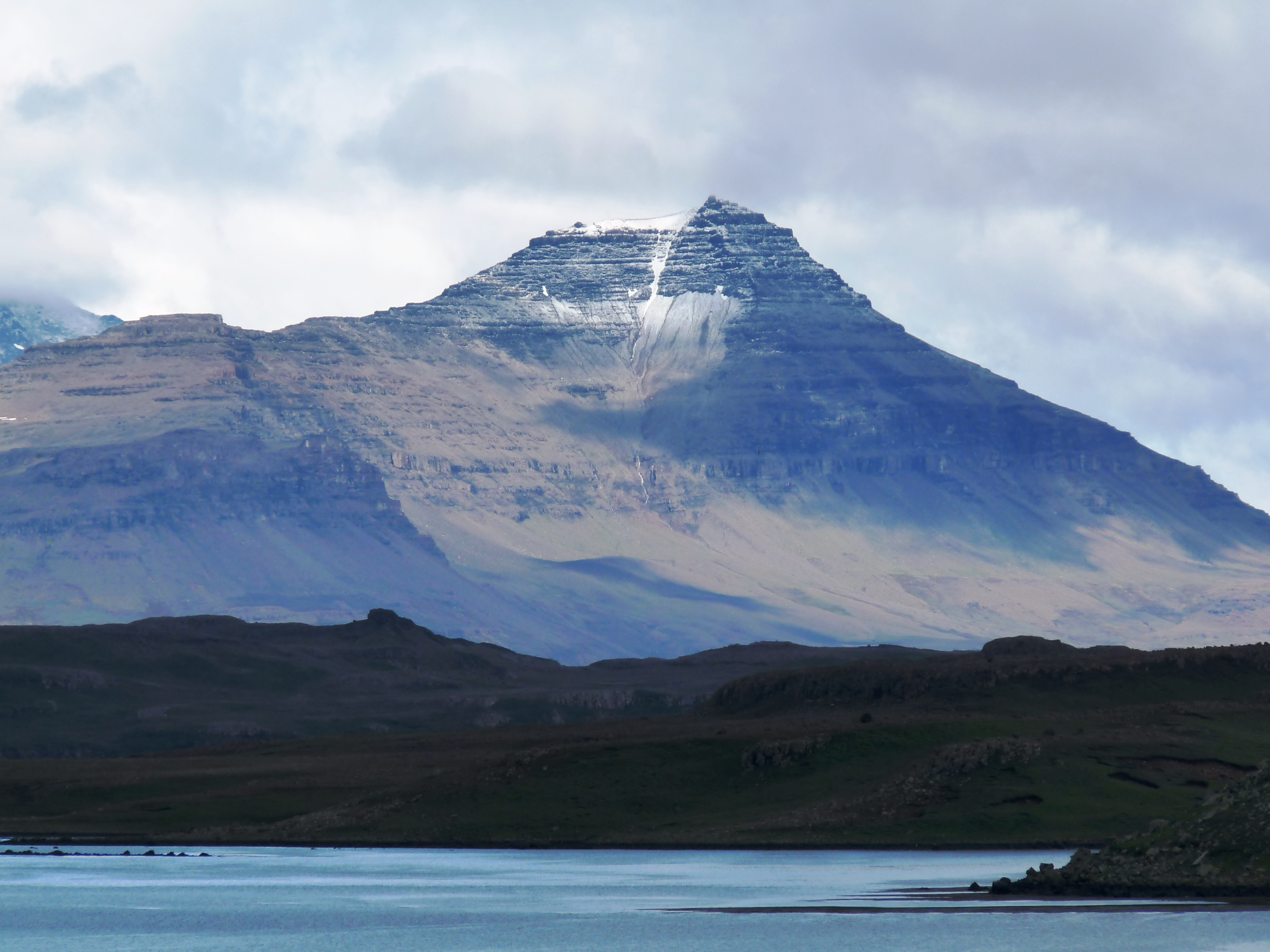

Highest point
- Elevation: 807 m (2,648 ft)
- Prominence: 731 m (2,398 ft)
- Coordinates: 49°13′58″S 69°58′30″E

Geography
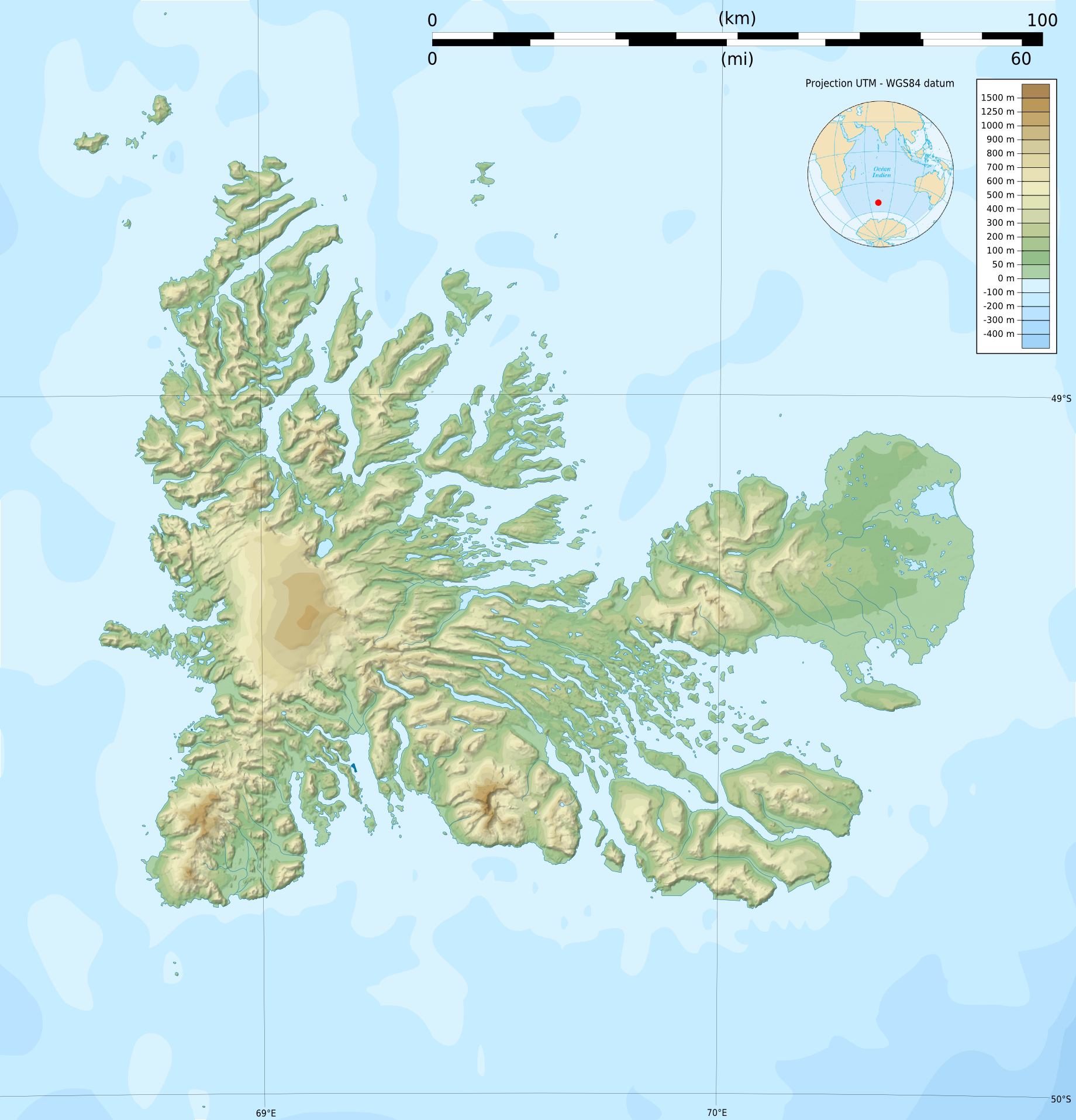
- Location within Kerguelen
- Location: Kerguelen Islands, French Southern and Antarctic Lands

Climbing
- First ascent: Unknown

Mont Trapèze (French pronunciation: [mɔ̃ tʁapɛz]) is a mountain in the French Southern and Antarctic Lands. Located on the Courbet Peninsula, Grande Terre, Kerguelen Islands, it rises to a height of 807 metres (2,648 ft) above sea level.

The name of this mountain was chosen by French geographer Edgar Aubert de la Rüe.
