= Pouce (Kerguelen) =

Mountain in Kerguelen

- Le Pouce
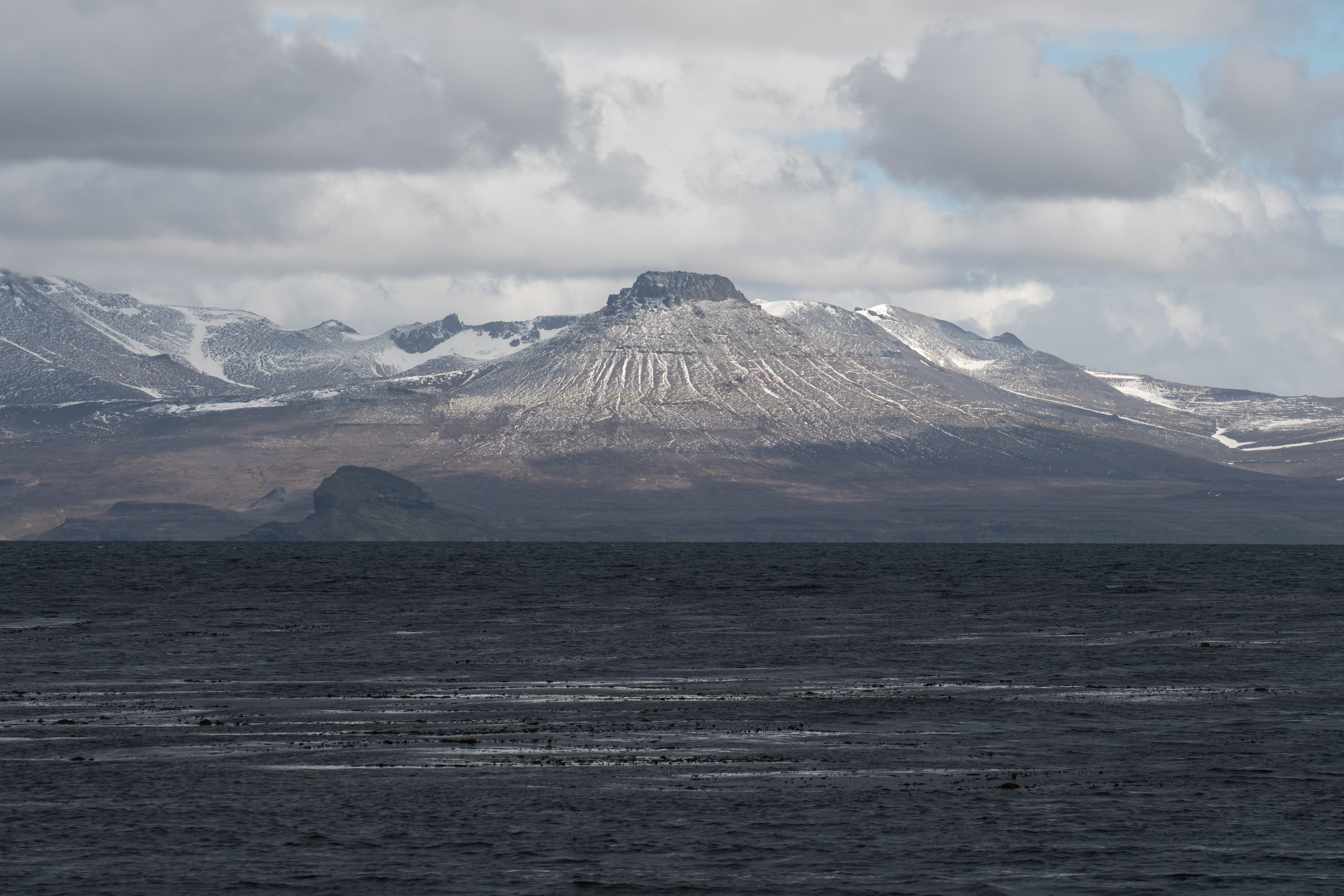
- View of the mountain from the sea

Highest point
- Elevation: 744 m (2,441 ft)
- Coordinates: 49°32′18″S 70°08′46″E

Geography
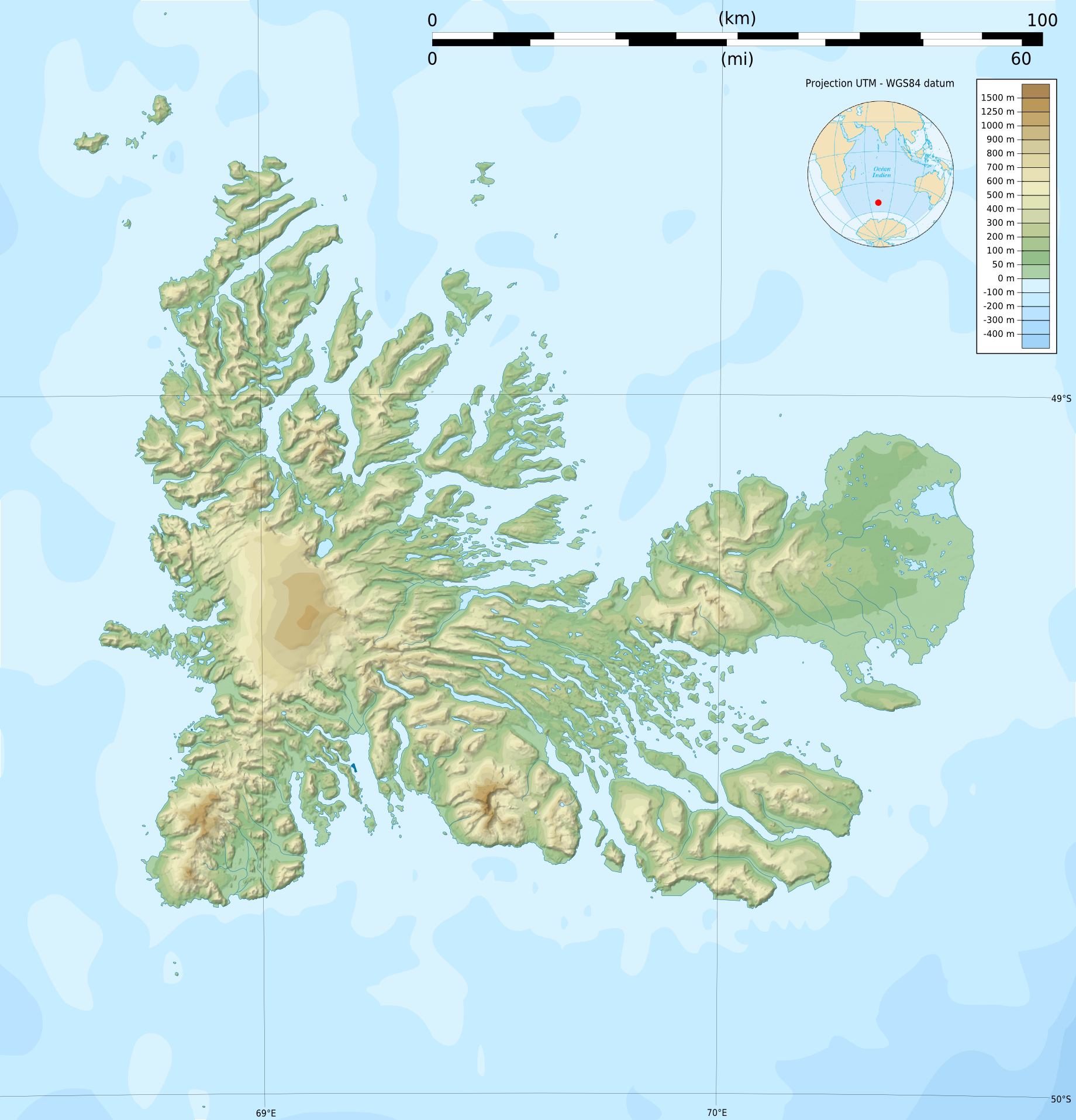
- Location within Kerguelen
- Location: Grande Terre, Kerguelen Islands, French Southern and Antarctic Lands

Geology
- Mountain type: Volcanic plug

Pouce or Le Pouce (French pronunciation: [lə pus]) is a mountain in the French Southern and Antarctic Lands. Located in the Ronarc'h Peninsula, Kerguelen, it rises to a height of 744 metres (2,441 ft) above sea level.

Mont Wyville Thomson, the highest point of the Ronarc'h Peninsula, rises roughly 5 kilometres (3.1 mi) to the SSE.

== History ==
This mountain was named "Thumb Peak" in 1874 by the chief scientists of the Challenger expedition who came to observe the transit of Venus. The current name is a French translation.

== See also ==
- Toponymy of the Kerguelen Islands
