= Prince de Galles Peninsula =

Peninsula in France

Presqu'île du Prince de Galles
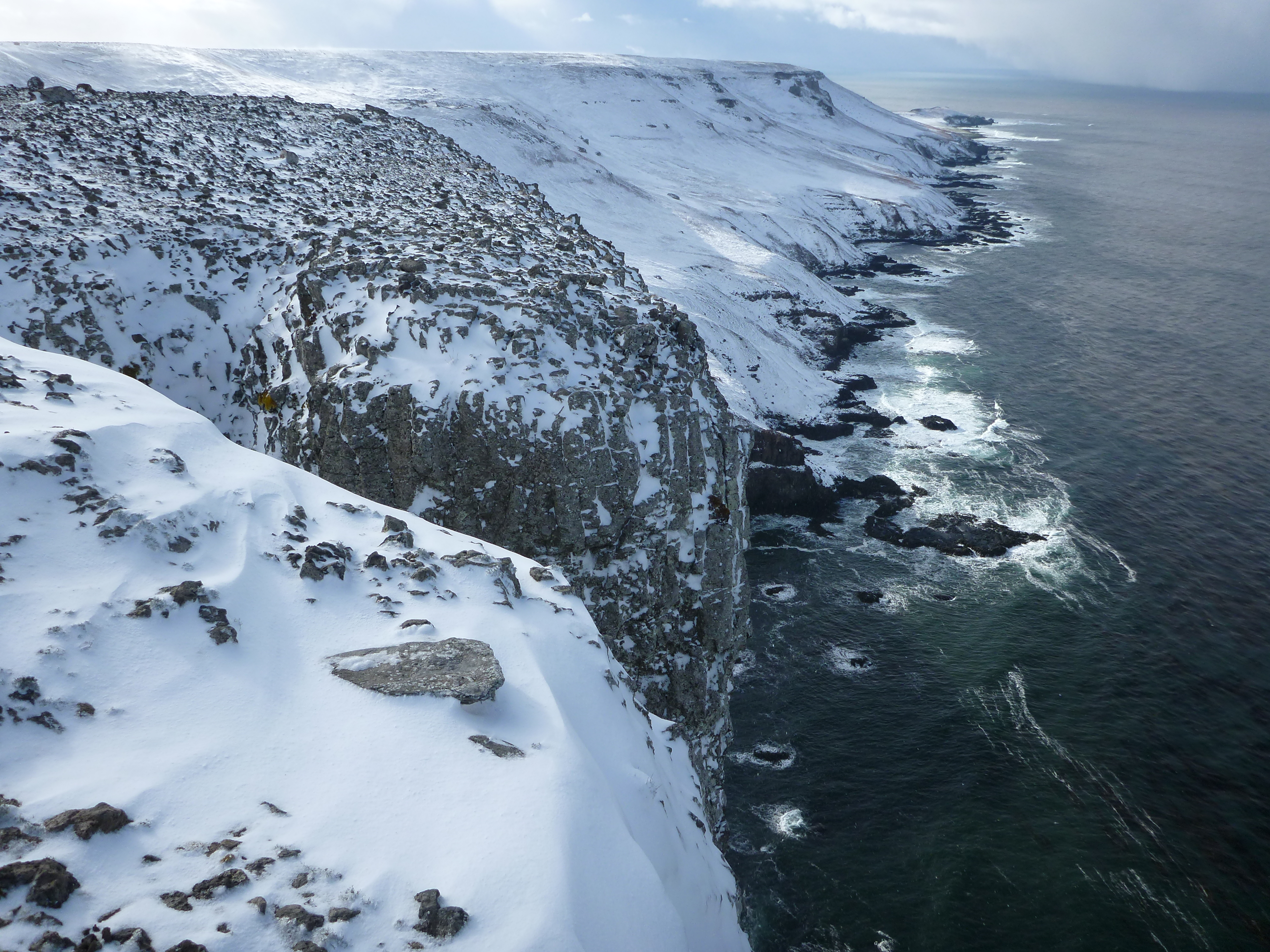
- Panorama of the peninsula's southern shore

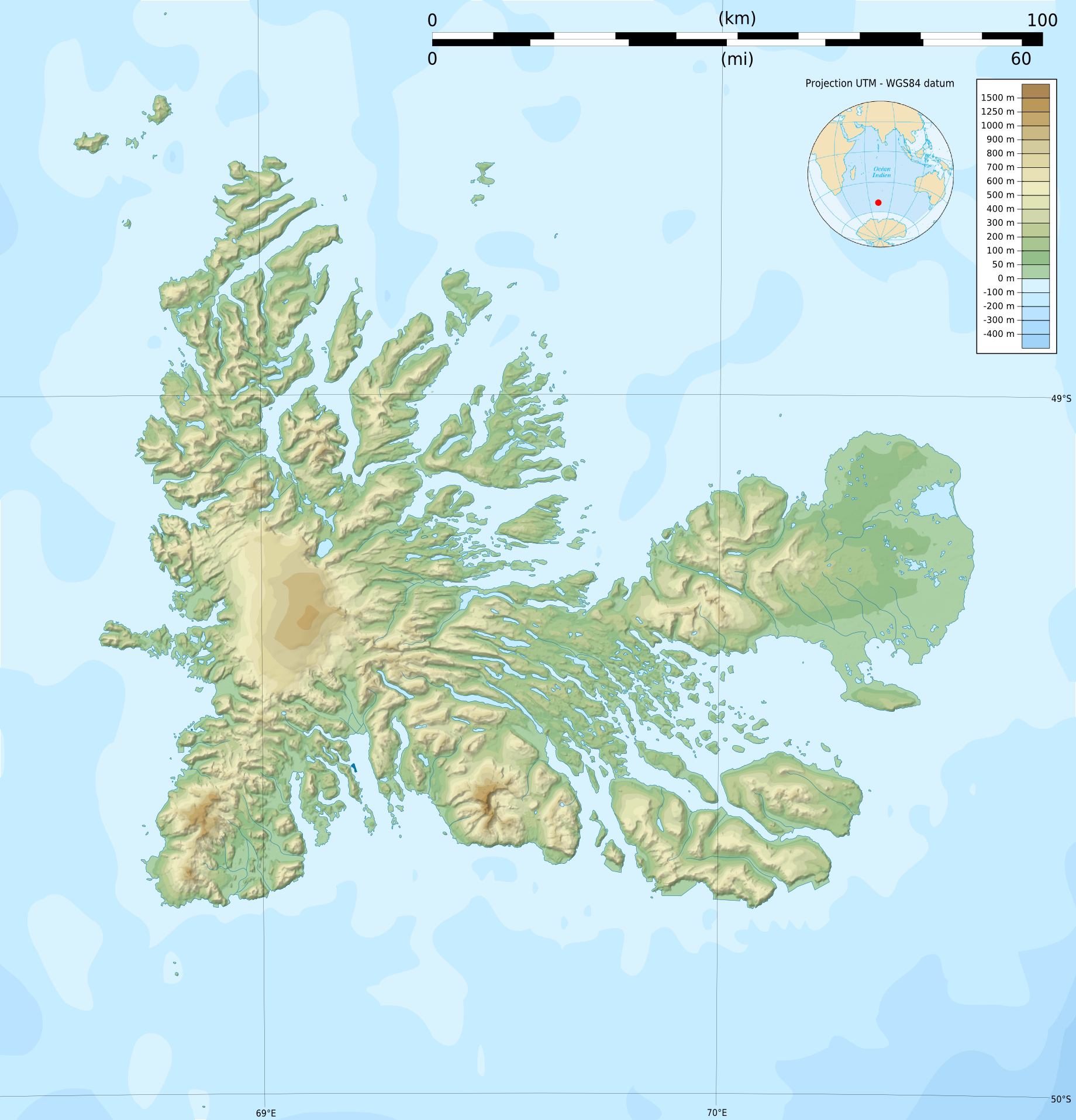
- Location within Kerguelen

Geography
- Location: Grande Terre, Kerguelen Islands
- Coordinates: 49°25′48″S 70°21′41″E
- Adjacent to: Baie Norvegienne; Golfe du Morbihan
- Length: 13 km (8.1 mi)
- Width: 4 km (2.5 mi)
- Highest elevation: 247 m (810 ft)

Administration
- France
- French Southern and Antarctic Lands

Demographics
- Population: 0

The Prince de Galles Peninsula (French: Presqu'île du Prince de Galles [pʁɛskil dy pʁɛ̃s də ɡal], lit. 'Prince of Wales Peninsula') is a peninsula in the Kerguelen Islands, French Southern and Antarctic Lands.

It was named in 1776 by Captain James Cook in honor of the Prince of Wales, the future King George IV.

== Geography ==
It located at the southeastern end of the much larger Courbet Peninsula and joined to it by a roughly 3 kilometres (1.9 mi) wide isthmus in the northwest. The Prince de Galles Peninsula is elongated, stretching from east to west for 13 kilometres (8.1 mi). Its highest point rises to a height of 247 metres (810 ft) above sea level. There are cliffs on the southern side, but the northern side is flat and gently sloping.

== See also ==
- Toponymy of the Kerguelen Islands
