= Courbet Peninsula =

Péninsule Courbet
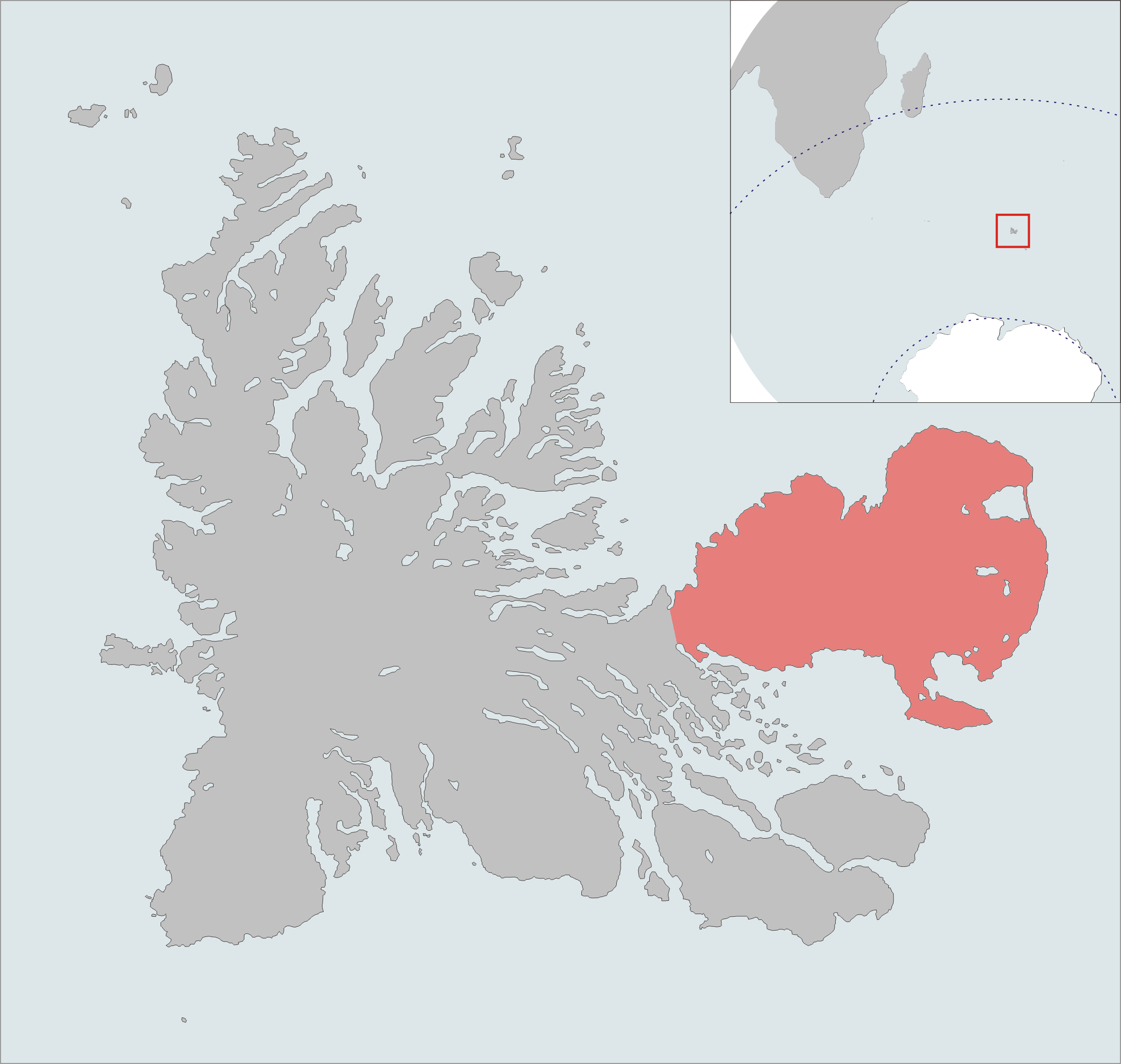
- Location of Courbet Peninsula on the mainland of Kerguelen

- Location within Indian Ocean

Geography
- Location: Indian Ocean
- Coordinates: 49°15′S 70°12′E
- Adjacent to: Baleiniers Gulf; Indian Ocean; Gulf of Morbihan; Norwegian Bay
- Length: 56 km (34.8 mi)
- Width: 36 km (22.4 mi)
- Highest elevation: 951 m (3120 ft)
- Highest point: Mont Crozier

Administration
- Kerguelen (France)
- Zone: French Southern and Antarctic Lands

Demographics
- Demonym: Courbette
- Population: 100
- Pop. density: 7/km^{2} (18/sq mi)

The Courbet Peninsula (French: Péninsule Courbet [penɛ̃syl kuʁbɛ]) is a peninsula in northeastern Grande Terre Island, the main island of the subantarctic Kerguelen Archipelago, Southern Indian Ocean. In the south of the peninsula is Port-aux-Français, the principal station of the archipelago.

== Geography ==
On the south coast of the peninsula is the French research station of Port-aux-Français, the only permanent settlement in the archipelago. Molloy, 10 km to the west of Port-aux-Francais along the north shore of the Gulf of Morbihan, is the site of a former observatory, established on 7 September 1874, by an American expedition led by G. P. Ryan, to observe the 1874 Transit of Venus.

The Courbet Peninsula occupies the northeastern portion of the main island. The eastern portion of the peninsula is relatively flat, with the surface composed mainly of alluvial deposits of glacial origin, and altitudes not exceeding 200 m. However, the western part is hillier and reaches 900 m at Mont Crozier near the isthmus. The hills and the slopes of Mont Crozier are olivine basalt with thicknesses up to 1000 m. Some 55 km long, the peninsula is about 10 km wide at its western base and widens to more than 30 km across further east. The Golfe des Baleiniers is on the northern and northwestern shore of the peninsula and includes smaller Hillsborough Bay (Baie du Hillsborough) and Accessible Bay on the northern coast further to the east. The southern coast forms the northern limit of the Gulf of Morbihan. At its south-eastern end is the small Prince of Wales Peninsula which encloses small Norwegian Bay (Baie Norvégienne). The easternmost point of the peninsula, and of Grande Terre, is Cape Ratmanoff, north of which is coastal Lake Marly. Further north still is Cape Digby, marking the north-eastern end of the peninsula. The northernmost point of the peninsula is Cape Cotter. The peninsula contains many lakes with boggy margins, the largest of which is Lake Marville, a coastal lake located at the eastern end. Even so, much of the inland area is quite arid and mostly bare, without vegetation.

== Environment ==
The Courbet Peninsula holds the largest breeding population of southern elephant seals in the archipelago, with 43,782 females recorded in 1997. The peninsula also holds a breeding colony of Antarctic fur seals.

=== Important Bird Area ===
Much of the peninsula has been identified by BirdLife International as a 600 km^{2} Important Bird Area (IBA) because of its value as a breeding site, especially for seabirds, with at least twenty-two species nesting there. Three large colonies of king penguins are found on the north-western coast, with a combined total of 172,400 pairs. There are several macaroni penguin colonies along the northern coast. The inland parts of the peninsula are important for holding the largest population of Eaton's pintails. There are some 300 pairs of wandering albatrosses and up to 800 pairs of northern giant petrels.

There are also large numbers of breeding gentoo penguins, Kerguelen shags, black-faced sheathbills, brown skuas, Kerguelen and Antarctic terns, and kelp gulls.

One of the threats to the bird populations on the peninsula, particularly the petrels, are the feral cats.
