= Edgar Aubert de la Rüe =

Swiss geographer, geologist, traveller & photographer (1901-1991)

Aubert de la Rue, Edgar
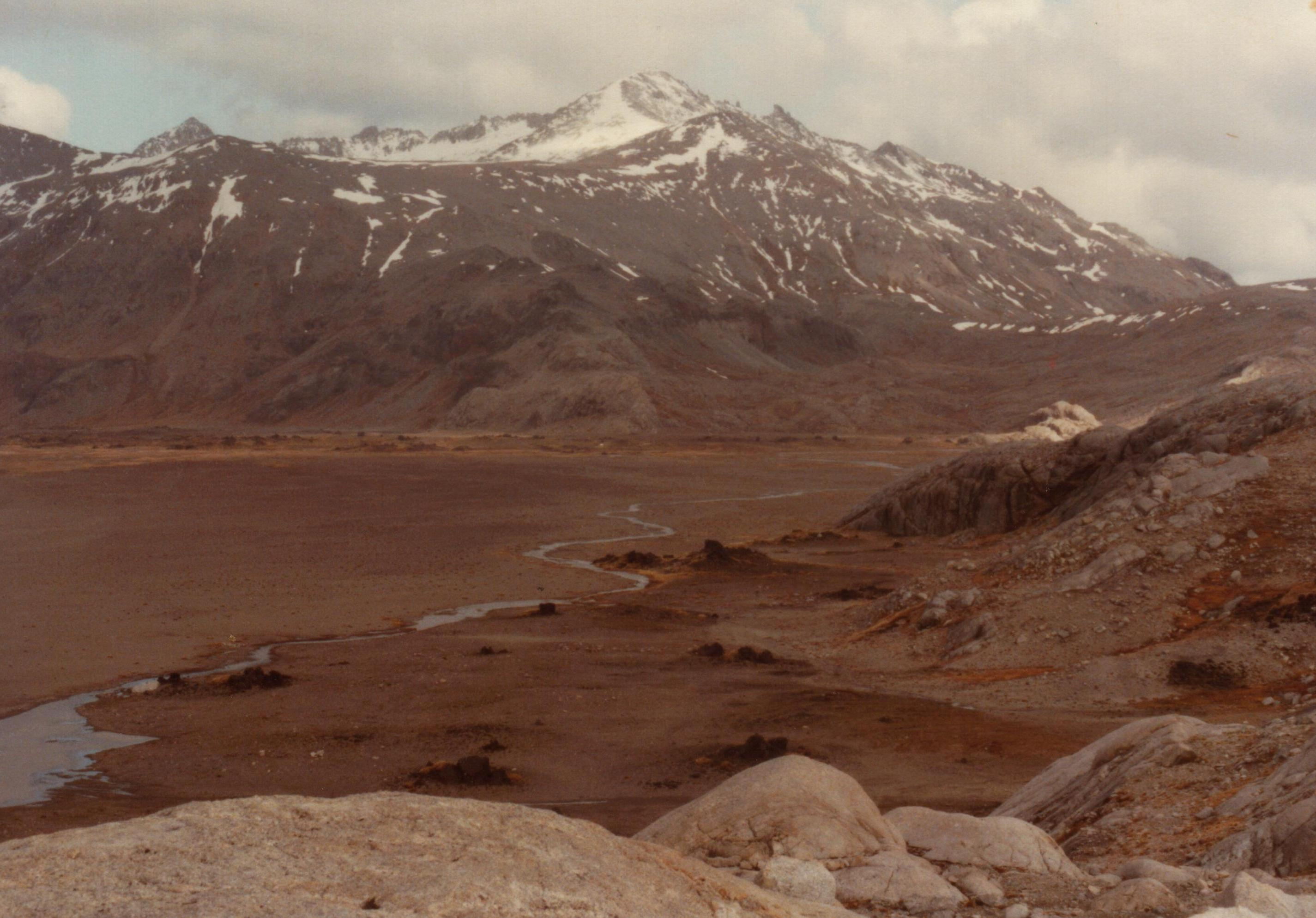
- Rallier du Baty Peninsula (named by Edgar Aubert de le Rue)
- Born: 7 October 1901; Geneva, Switzerland
- Died: 24 February 1991 (aged 89); Lausanne
- Occupations: Geographer and Geologist
- Known for: Exploration
- Spouse: Andrée

Edgar Aubert de la Rüe (1901–1991) was a French geographer, geologist, traveller and photographer who was primarily devoted to the islands of Saint Pierre and Miquelon, Kerguelen, and Vanuatu. Mount Aubert de la Rue on Heard Island is named after him.

== Biography ==
Edgar Aubert de la Rüe was born on 7 October 1901 in Geneva (Switzerland) and died on 24 February 1991 in Lausanne.

He took on the duties of an engineer-geologist from the University of Nancy and a scientific adviser for the French Southern and Antarctic Lands. He was also a Doctor of Natural Science from the University of Paris.

He dedicated himself to the islands of Saint Pierre and Miquelon (1932, 1935, 1937, 1941 to 1943, 1948, and 1970), Kerguelen (1928, 1929, 1931, and from 1949 to 1953), and Vanuatu, and from November 1937 to May 1938 he stayed in French Somaliland.

As an Associate of the National Museum of Natural History in Paris, his geological activities led him to difficult surveys all around the French Union: Morocco, Ivory Coast, Middle Congo, Madagascar, Réunion, Syria - Lebanon, and French Polynesia.

Edgar Aubert de la Rüe was elected as a corresponding member of the Académie des sciences d'outre-mer on 7 December 1951.

He was Professor of higher studies of Latin America from 1965 to 1967.

=== Summary of his travels ===
- Kerguelen Archipelago: 12 November 1928 to 25 February 1929, 25 January to 27 March 1931, 11 December 1949 to 16 January 1950, 12 December 1951 to 6 January 1953;
- Saint Pierre and Miquelon: 7 journeys (1932, 1935, 1937, 1939, 1941 to 1943, 1948, 1970) totalling three years;
- French Somaliland: November 1937 to May 1938, accompanied by his wife.
- Numerous other journeys - always with his wife - notably Patagonia, Brazil, and Vanuatu.

== Kerguelen Islands ==
Edgar Aubert de la Rue made six journeys to the Kerguelen Islands ranging from six weeks to over a year. He spent in total more than two years in the islands - mostly with his wife Andrée. He made a significant contribution to the geology and biology of the area including two maps published in 1932 and 1952.

His first visit was from 12 November 1928 to 25 February 1929 when he stayed at Port-Couvreux and Port-Jeanne d’Arc and explored the coasts and the islands aboard whaling vessels. From 24 January to the end of March 1931, he was commissioned to undertake a geological expedition for the Ministry of Colonies. From these two journeys came, in 1932, a thesis which was a sum of his unique knowledge of the Kerguelens at that time. Edgar Aubert de la Rüe returned to the Kerguelens from 11 December 1949 to 16 January 1950 and again from 12 December 1951 to January 1953 as a geologist and scientific adviser. He assisted in the first years of creation of the current database.

The many place names that he assigned during his expeditions can be classified into different categories: - Descriptive names for the majority of his place names. - Names of professors and colleagues - e.g. Gandillot, Léon, Lu-taud, Jérémine... - Names of scientists or explorers on previous expeditions - e.g. Valdivia, Chun, Etienne Peau, Rallier du Baty... - Name of his wife: Andrée Aubert de la Rüe.

List of place names assigned in the Kerguelen Islands by Edgar Aubert de la Rüe

- Acoena (Valley)
- Agates (Mountains)
- Albatros (River)
- Américains (River)
- Andrée Aubert de la Rüe (Mountains)
- Azorella (Hill)
- Banquise (Cove)
- Bélier (Island)
- Belle-Ile
- Bellevue (Hills)
- Bellouard (Island)
- Ben Edra (Point)
- Berland (Islet)
- Blanc (Mountain)
- Bleu (Lake)
- Brisée (Rock)
- Cabanes (Point)
- Cachée (River)
- Cagne (Islets)
- Canards (Pond)
- Carroz (Mountain)
- Cataractes (River)
- Central (Plateau)
- Charbon (Ravine)
- Charbon (Valley)
- Charrier (Bay)
- Château (Crater)
- Château (River)
- Chionis (Point)
- Chun (Lake)
- Citadelle (The)
- Cormorans (Islet)
- Coupole (The)
- Créneaux (The)
- Dauphins (Point)
- Demi-Lune (Pass)
- Diane (Rock)
- Doris (Lagoon)
- Drumlins (Plateau)
- Eboulements (Ravine)
- Est (Plain)
- Est (River)
- Equerre (Bay)
- Etang (Point)
- Etienne Peau (Mountain)
- Etoile (Point)
- Fondrières (Plateau)
- Froid (Lake)
- Galets (River)
- Gampert (Mountain)
- Gandillot (Lake)
- Glaciers (River)
- Gorfous Dorés (Coast)
- Grande Cascade (The)
- Grande Muraille (The)
- Grottes (Cove)
- Harem (Point)
- Haug (Mountain)
- Invisible (Bay)
- Jalu (Mountain)
- Jérémine (Ridge)
- Joly (Cove)
- Joncs (River)
- Jumelles (Rocks)
- Kidder (Cape)
- Lac (Isthmus)
- Lacs (Plateau)
- Laves (Crest)
- Léon Lutaud (Mountain)
- Lichens (Mountain)
- Louis Gentil (Glacier)
- Louison (Cove)
- Lozère (Cascade)
- Mamelles (The)
- Manchots (River)
- Marville (Lake)
- Mica (Ravine)
- Milieu (Mountain)
- Millot (Point)
- Moraines (River)
- Neiges (Valley)
- Névés (Mountain)
- Noire (Beach)
- Nord (River)
- Norvégienne (River)
- Olsen (Valley)
- Otarie (River)
- Ouest (River)
- Paul Lemoine (Glacier)
- Phonolite (Rock)
- Pierre Termier (Mountain)
- Quille (The)
- Radioleine (Cove)
- Rallier du Baty (Péninsula)
- Ratmanoff (Cape)
- Ravelo (Island)
- Refuge (Mountain)
- Ronde (Hillock)
- Rouge (Cape)
- Saint-Malo (Cove)
- Simoun (Rock)
- Sinistre (Valley)
- Solitude (Mountain)
- Source (Lake)
- Studer (River)
- Sud (River)
- Tempêtes (Mountain)
- Terrasses (River)
- Tourmente (Mountain)
- Tranchant (Cove)
- Trapèze (Mountain)
- Trois Lacs (River)
- Tussock (Plateau)
- Valdivia (Mountain)
- Vent (Plateau)
- Verte (Rock)
- Vertes (Mountains)
- Volcan (River)

Source : Delépine, Gracie: Toponymie des Terres Australes, Paris: Documentation Française, 1973, 433 pages (in French).

== Publications ==
- 1928: Precious and Ornamental stones, Lechevalier, Paris, 301 p. (in French)
- 1930: Unknown French Lands (Islands of Kerguelen-Crozet-Saint-Paul-Nouvelle-Amsterdam), SPE, Paris, 189 p. (in French)
- 1932: Geological and geographical study of the Kerguelen archipelago, Revue de géographie physique et de géographie dynamique, Paris, 231 p. + XXV pl. + 2 maps (in French)
- 1935: Man and the Islands, Gallimard, coll. géographie humaine Paris, 194 p. No. 6 (in French)
- 1937: The Territory of Saint-Pierre et Miquelon: Study of physical and human geography Read online (in French)
- 1937: The Territory of Saint-Pierre et Miquelon, Journal de la Société des américanistes, Paris, 133 p., 6 pl. 1 map (in French)
- 1939: French Somaliland, Gallimard, Coll. Géographie humaine 14, Paris, 162 p. (in French) Read online (in French)
- 1940: Man and the wind Gallimard, Coll. Géographie humaine, Paris n° 16 (in French)
- 1947: The region of Mont-Laurier, province of Québec, Canada. Some aspects of human geography in a shielded Canadian sector Read online (in French)
- 1950: Some observations on the Oyampi of Oyapock (French Guyana) Read online (in French)
- 1953: The Southern Lands, (Presse Universitaire de France) (in French)
- 1954: Two years on the Islands of Desolation, éditions Julliard, Coll. Sciences et Voyages, 316 pages (in French)
- 1957: Arid Brazil (Life in the catinga) Gallimard, coll. Géographie humaine 29, Paris, 274 pages, ill., 23 cm (in French)
- 1957: Tropics (Tropical nature), (with Jean-Paul Harroy and François Bourlière), Horizons de France, 206 pages (in French)
- 1958: Man and Volcanoes Gallimard, Coll. Géographie humaine 30, Paris, 398 pages - XVI p. of plates, ill., 23 cm (in French)

== Bibliography ==
- Durand, Marie, (2018). « Géographie humaine, sciences coloniales et intérêt ethnologique : vie et œuvre d’Edgar Aubert de la Rüe », in BEROSE - International Encyclopaedia of the Histories of Anthropology, Paris.

== See also ==
- Saint Pierre and Miquelon
- Kerguelen Islands
- Vanuatu
- French Somaliland
