= 1943 in France =

- Decades: 1920s; 1930s; 1940s; 1950s; 1960s
- See also: History of France; Timeline of French history; List of years in France

Events from the year 1943 in France.

== Incumbents ==
- Chief of State: Philippe Pétain
- Vice-president of the Council of Ministers: Pierre Laval

== Events ==
- 15 January – Fernand Grenier broadcasts on Radio Londres offering Communist support for Free France.
- 22 January – Round up of Marseille, organized by Nazi Germany, begins: French police carry out a raid in the Old Port to arrest Jews.
- 24 January – Round up of Marseille ends with 30,000 people expelled from their neighborhood and 2,000 Jews eventually sent to the extermination camps.
- 9 February – Rue Sainte-Catherine Roundup: The Gestapo, directed by Klaus Barbie, arrest 86 Jews in Lyon.
- 21 May – Riom Trial ends, attempt by Vichy France regime to prove that the leaders of the French Third Republic had been responsible for France's defeat by Germany in 1940.
- 21 June – Resistance leaders Jean Moulin, Henri Aubry (alias Avricourt and Thomas), Raymond Aubrac, Bruno Larat (alias Xavier-Laurent Parisot), André Lassagne (alias Lombard), Colonel Albert Lacaze, Colonel Émile Schwarzfeld (alias Blumstein), René Hardy (alias Didot) and Dr Frédéric Dugoujon are arrested at a meeting in Dugoujon's house in Caluire-et-Cuire, a suburb of Lyon, and sent to Montluc Prison in Lyon.
- 21 October – Lucie Aubrac and others in her Resistance cell liberate Raymond Aubrac from Gestapo imprisonment.
- 22 November – Lebanon gains independence from France.

== Sport ==
- 25 April – The 41st edition of the Paris-Roubaix bicycle race resumes following three years of cancellations due to war. Marcel Kint (BEL) wins the race in 6h 01' 32".

== Births ==
- 11 February – Pierre Matignon, cyclist (died 1987)
- 20 February – Carlos, né Yvan-Chrysostome Dolto, singer, entertainer and actor (died 2008)
- 4 March – Philippe Gaulier, drama theorist and clown (died 2026)
- 13 March – André Téchiné, film director and screenwriter
- 23 April – Hervé Villechaize, actor (died 1993 in the United States)
- 18 May – Jacques-Pierre Amette, journalist and writer
- 22 May – Marie-Françoise Audollent, actress (died 2008)
- 6 June – Jean-Michel Bertrand, politician (died 2008)
- 15 June – Johnny Hallyday, né Jean-Philippe Smet, pop singer and actor (died 2017)
- 23 June – Patrick Bokanowski, filmmaker
- 5 July – Pierre Villepreux, rugby player and coach
- 30 August – Jean-Claude Killy, alpine skier and a triple Olympic champion
- 5 November – Alain Fournier, computer graphics researcher (died 2000)
- 5 December – Eva Joly, magistrate, born in Norway
- Full date unknown – Olivier Mitterrand, CEO

== Deaths ==
- 29 January – Henriette Caillaux, socialite and assassin (born 1874)
- 8 July – Jean Moulin, prefect and Resistance leader, died in custody (born 1899)
- 18 August – Maurice Couette, physicist (born 1858)
- 24 August – Simone Weil, philosopher and social activist (born 1909)
- 19 October – Camille Claudel, sculptor and graphic artist (born 1864)
- 23 October – André Antoine, actor-manager (born 1858)
- 10 December – Jean-Baptiste Bienvenu-Martin, Socialist leader and Minister (born 1847)

== See also ==
- List of French films of 1943
