= Henri Aubry =

French resistance fighter

- Born: 3 March 1914; Longwy, Meurthe-et-Moselle
- Died: 10 November 1970 (aged 56)
- Other names: Avricourt, Thomas
- Known for: French Resistance Fighter

Henri Aubry ("Avricourt", "Thomas") (3 March 1914 – 10 November 1970) was a member of the French Resistance during World War II and a leader of the Combat group.

== Biography ==
Born in Longwy, Meurthe-et-Moselle, Aubry was an Alumnus of the École supérieure de journalisme de Lille (Lille Graduate School of Journalism) (6th promotion), and lieutenant in the colonial infantry, he was on leave since the October 1940 armistice. Having rejoined his family in Morlaix, he was active in a resistance group of Rennes. In the intention to enter Great Britain, he got to Marseille where he met Maurice Chevance, who convinced to join the small Mouvement de Libération Nationale (National Liberation Movement) of Henri Frenay and Berty Albrecht.

The lieutenant participated in the MLN in the South zone: Deputy of Chevance, military leader of the region R2 (Marseille), alongside Jacques Baumel, then inspector of the Secret Army, and finally chief of staff of Charles Delestraint.

On 21 June 1943 at Caluire-et-Cuire, Aubry was arrested by the team of Klaus Barbie in the house of Dr. Frédéric Dugoujon, along with Jean Moulin, Raymond Aubrac, André Lassagne, René Hardy, Albert Lacaze, Émile Schwarzfeld and Bruno Larat. Hardy and Aubrac escaped. Jean Moulin was interrogated and tortured, dying from his injuries. Colonel Schwarzfeld and Captain Larat died at the camp. André Lassagne returned from deportation.

Imprisoned in Lyon, Aubry was beaten and was subject to several mock executions. Transferred to Paris, he was released 12 December 1943. Colonel Lacaze and Dr. Dugoujon were released January 17, 1944. Some resistance members has speculated that it was Aubry who broke down under torture and gave Moulin's name to Barbie.

At the Libération of France, Aubry was appointed Director in the Ministry of Prisoners, Deportees and Refugees by Henri Frenay. In 1947 and 1954, he testified at the trials of Hardy. Challenged by the memories of Baumel and Bourdet, he was defended by his former boss, Chevance.

=== Bibliography ===
- Noguères, Henri (1967). Histoire de la Résistance en France [History of the Resistance in France] (in French). Laffont.
- Chevance, Maurice (1990). Vingt mille heures d'angoiss [Twenty Thousand Hours of Terror] (in French). Laffont.
- Granet, Marie; Michel, Henri (1957). Combat, histoire d'un mouvement de Résistance [Combat, History of a Movement of the Resistance] (in French). PUF.
- Frenay, enri (1973). La nuit finira [The night Will End] (in French). Stock.
- Bourdet, Claude (1975). L'aventure incertaine [The Uncertain Adventrure] (in French). Stock.
- Baumel, Jacques (1999). Résister [Resistance Fighter] (in French). Albin Michel. ISBN 978-2226108661.

=== External links ===
- (in French) Thèse de doctorat d'histoire de François-Yves Guillin, Le Général Delestraint, Premier Chef de l'Armée Secrète, en ligne in extenso
