= Armée secrète =

French resistance group in WWII (1942–44)

Armée Secrète
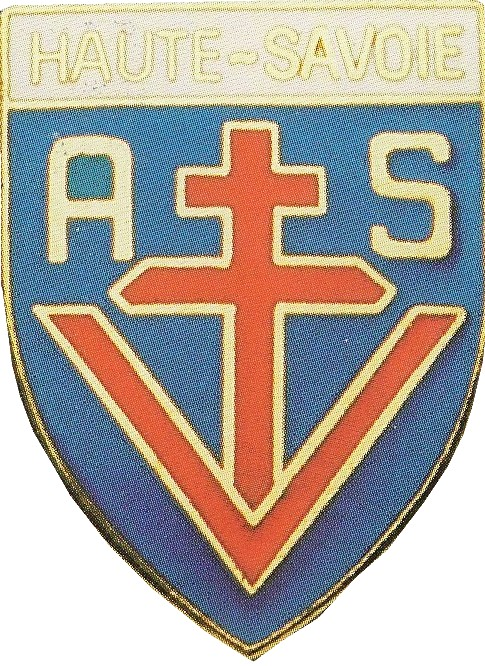
- Insignia of the Armée secrète in Haute-Savoie
- Formation: 11 November 1942
- Dissolved: 1 February 1944; 82 years ago
- Type: Resistance network
- Region served: France
- Official language: French
- Chef: Charles Delestraint
- Chef d'état-major: François Morin-Forestier, later Pierre Dejussieu-Pontcarral
- Key people: Henri Frenay, Jean Moulin
- Affiliations: Mouvements unis de la Résistance (MUR)

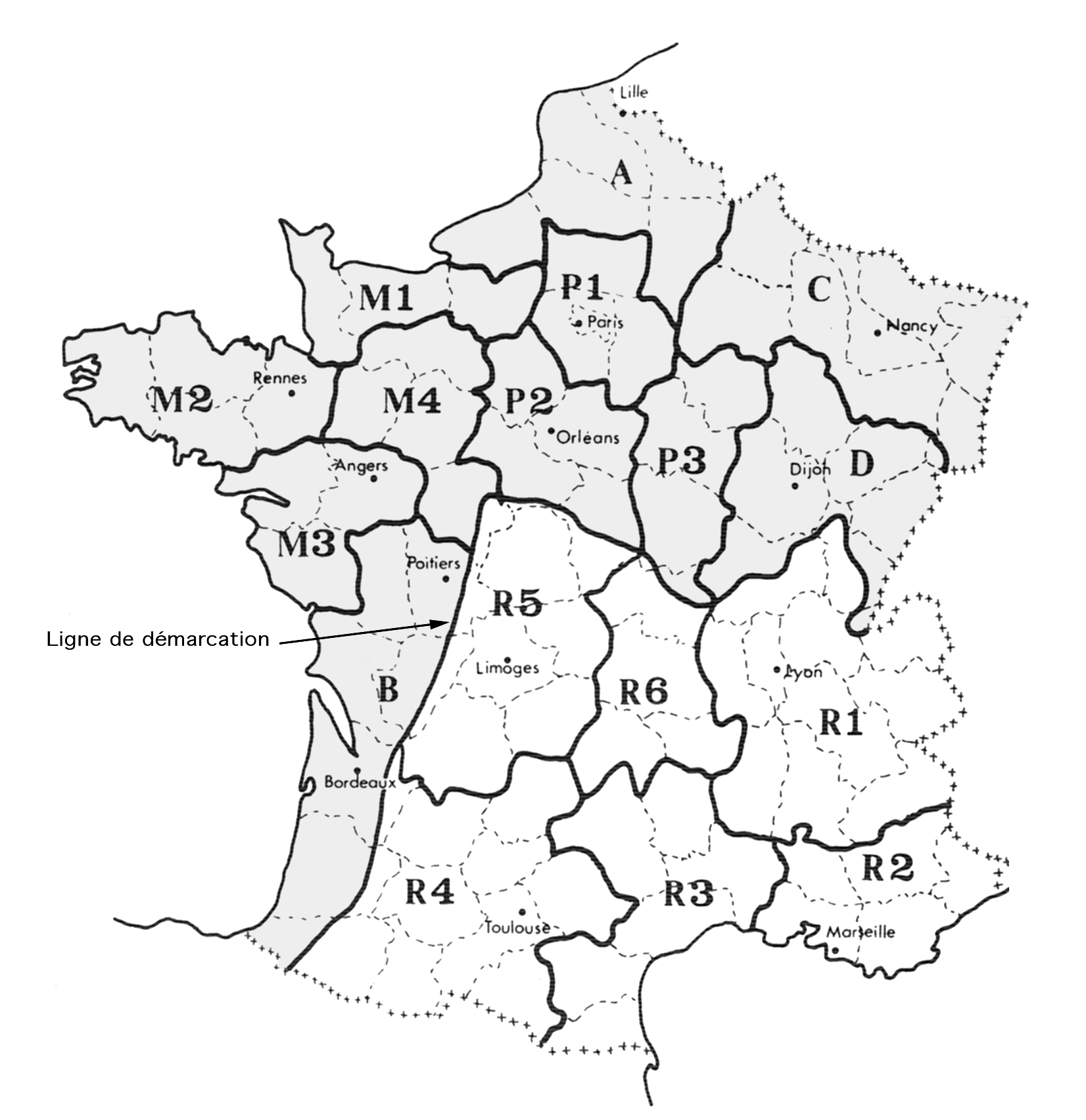
Regional organization of the French Resistance

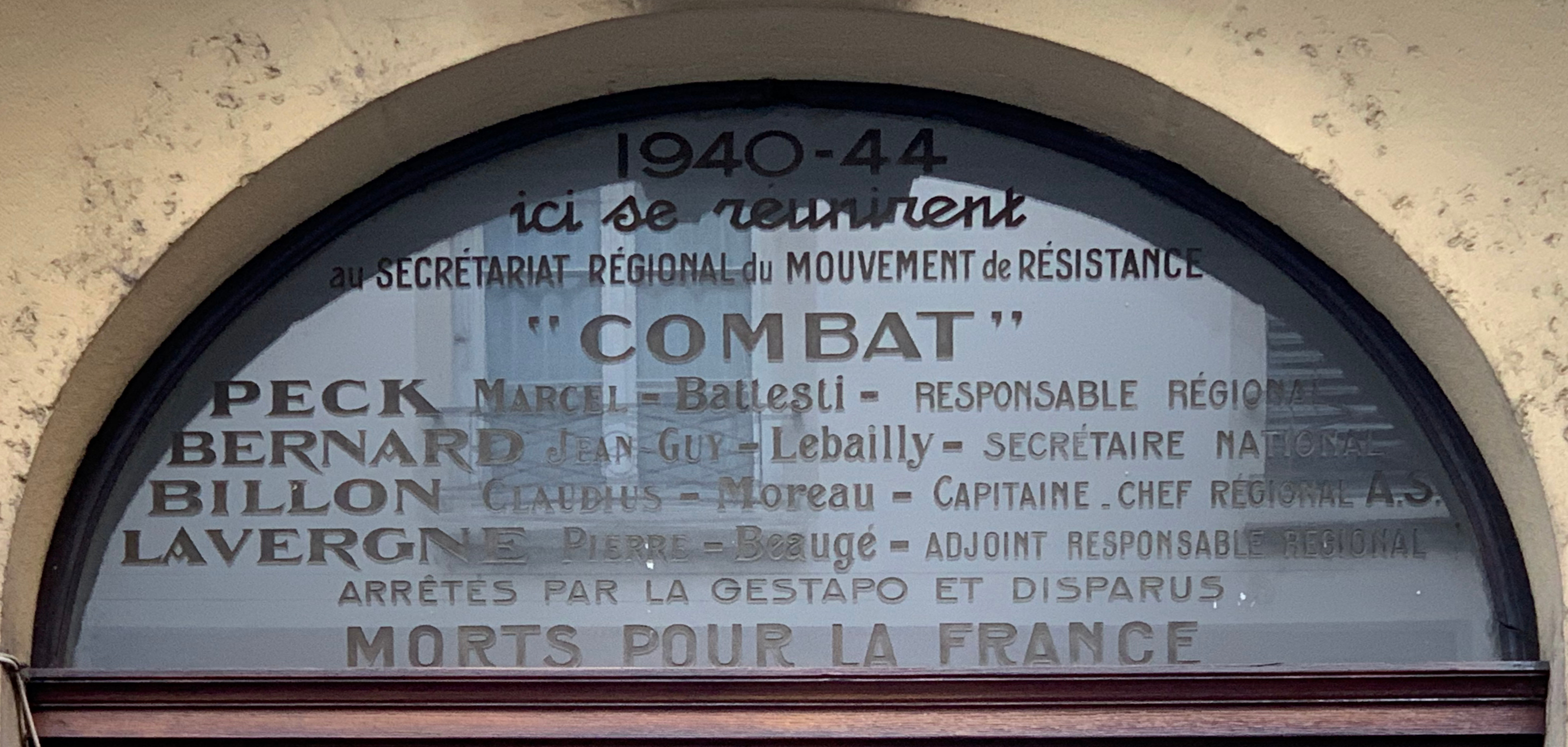
Commemorative plaque in Lyon

The armée secrète was a French military organization active during World War II. The collective grouped the paramilitary formations of the three most important Gaullist resistance movements in the southern zone.

== History ==
In mid-1942, in the R1 Region, the three major Gaullist movements (Combat, Libération-sud and the Franc-Tireurs) wanted to coordinate the military units at their disposal to make them more effective. Henri Frenay, leader of Combat, claimed command of the new structure, but faced opposition from Emmanuel d'Astier de La Vigerie, leader of Liberation-Sud and Jean-Pierre Levy, head of the Franc-Tireurs. Jean Moulin insisted that the post should go to someone with no affiliation to one of these groups, so Frenay proposed Charles Delestraint, a general recalled from his retirement during the Battle of France, who admired General Charles de Gaulle and detested Vichy. He was the only general officer who had been promoted despite that defeat; the proposal was unanimously accepted.

Jean Moulin and General Delestraint first met on 28 August 1942 in Lyon. At the end of the interview, Jean Moulin ordered the three regional chiefs of the paramilitary formations of the great movements made available to Delestraint, for him to choose the best suited to the regional direction of the Secret Army. To this position, eminently clandestine and dangerous, the general named Captain Claudius Billon. As early as September, Billon appointed each of the AS departmental heads for R1, with the exception of the AS chief for Ain, named by Delestraint himself.

In October, Delestraint was appointed (officially) by General de Gaulle. General de Lattre had also been approached for this post, but had refused. Delestraint took command on 11 November 1942. His secretary was François-Yves Guillin; the head of the 2nd AS office was Joseph Gastaldo. André Lassagne was the deputy of Gastaldo, before becoming Delestraint, and the information was entrusted to Albert Lacaze (4th office). Its chief of staff was François Morin-Forestier, from Combat, staff in which is also integrated Raymond Aubrac.

On 27 November 1942, in Collonges-au-Mont-d'Or, the constituent meeting of the Southern Zone Coordination Committee was held and the head of the Secret Army was presented by Jean Moulin. This committee intended to unite the three major resistance movements.

In December, Delestraint, inexperienced in the constraints of illegal life, crossed the demarcation line to make contact with the major movements in the northern zone: Liberation, the Civil and Military Organization (CMO) National, Libération-Nord. Then, back in the free zone, he took part in the creation of the United Movements of the Resistance (MUR) on 26 January 1943 in Miribel, in Ain.

At the beginning of February 1943, Hugo Geissler, Kommandeur of the Sipo-SD in Vichy, decapitated the Secret Army of the R1 region. On 1 February in Lyon's Place du Pont, he arrested Billon, head of the AS in R1 (eleven departments), along with his deputy Pierre Lavergne. On 3 February, at 31 rue Basse-des-Rives in Saint-Étienne, during a secret meeting of the headquarters of the departmental AS, he also arrested the head of AS Loire, Lieutenant Vidiani, and his companions. On 10 February, in Le Puy-en-Velay, they continued to dismantle the AS in R1 with the arrest of the chief of AS in Haute-Loire Alfred Salvatelli and his companions at his home. After the 10 February arrest the Haute-Loire resistance joined region R6 (Auvergne). On 27 May 1943, these three arrests, orchestrated by Geissler, featured prominently at the beginning of the Ernst Kaltenbrunner's report addressed to Joachim von Ribbentrop, Minister of Foreign Affairs for the Reich.

Delestraint then fought against the advice of Frenay (who had been provisionally delegated general of the Secret Army) to put the Army under the tutelage of the MUR. Frenay, on the one hand the No. 2 of the Secret Army and on the other a member of the Coordination Committee of the same army, then wished the recall of Delestraint and his own appointment as head of the Secret Army, which were rejected by the other members of the Coordinating Committee, Moulin, d'Astier and Levy.

In London in February 1943 to meet Allied authorities, Delestraint was asked to make his troop the "nucleus of the future French army", estimated at 150,000 men. Unfortunately, Francois Morin-Forestier was arrested in March with Raymond Aubrac, Maurice Kriegel-Valrimont and Serge Ravanel of the MUR, and only released in May, thanks to the action of his former co-detainee Raymond Aubrac. His release did not allow his return to the staff: too exposed, he was ex-filtered to London. In April, Delestraint returned to Paris, arriving on 11 April. By the 4 June report, Moulin deplores the risks that Delestraint was taking, working alone when he would do better if assisted.

On 9 June 1943 Delestraint, Gastaldo and their deputy Jean-Louis Théobald were arrested in Paris. On 21 June a staff meeting was held to find a successor to Delestraint in Caluire-et-Cuire. Léonard Émile Schwarzfeld, candidate to replace Delestraint, Aubrac, candidate for the leadership in the northern zone, and Lassagne for the southern zone, as well as other leaders of the Resistance such as Moulin, Henri Aubry, René Hardy, Albert Lacaze and Bruno Larat were taken prisoner. In July 1943, Colonel Pierre Dejussieu-Pontcarral was appointed chief of staff of a Secret Army now without an official leader. The Chief of Staff of the Southern Zone was General Jouffrault, until he was also arrested in August 1943.

On 1 February 1944 the Gaullist Secret Army merged with the French Forces of the Interior (FFI), with the Army Resistance Organization (ORA) and the French Francs-tireurs et partisans (FTPF, communists, not to be confused with the Franc-Tireur movement).

This structure was mainly found in the southern half of France: Rhône-Alpes (R1) and Auvergne (R6), but also Limousin (R5), South-East and the Southwest (R4). It corresponded to the organizational structure used by Combat.

Uniting the regions of the free zone took only a few weeks, the various chiefs being chosen from among the regional chiefs in office. In Region A, the workforce was almost entirely composed of members of the CMO.

== Regions ==
Layout of Resistance forces
Region	Departement	Leader	Others
B	Region	General Louis-Eugène Faucher	
B	Deux-Sèvres	Edmond Proust	
M	Region	General Louis-Alexandre Audibert	
M2	Region	General Marcel Allard	
M2	Finistère	Mathieu Donnart; Roger Bourrières	
M2	Morbihan	Maurice Guillaudot; Paul Chenailler	
R1 - Rhône-Alpes	Region	Captain Claudius Billon Capt. Albert Chambonnet	Pierre Lavergne (Maquis) André Vansteenberghe (intelligence)
R1 - Rhône-Alpes	Ain	André Bob Fornier; Capt. Henri Romans-Petit	Jean Perret; Marcel Gagneux
R1 - Rhône-Alpes	Haute-Savoie	Cmdr. Jean Vallette d'Osia; Henri Romans-Petit	Maurice Anjot (adjoint); Tom Morel (maquis)
R1 - Rhône-Alpes	Isère	Samuel Job; Albert Reynier; Cmdr. de Reyniès	Cmdr. Albert Séguin de Reyniès (genl. staff); Louis Nal
R1 - Rhône-Alpes	Jura	Valentin Abeille	
R1 - Rhône-Alpes	Loire	Lt. Gaëtan Vidiani	
R1 - Rhône-Alpes	Haute-Loire	Capt. Alfred Salvatelli	
R1 - Rhône-Alpes	Saône-et-Loire	Georges de la Ferté-Sénectère	
R2 - Sud-Est	Region	Henri Masi	Charles Gonard (volunteer corps); Jean Garcin (volunteer corps)
R2 - Sud-Est	Bouches-du-Rhône	André Aune	
R3 - Sud	Region		
R3 - Sud	Gard	Albert Thomas	
R3 - Sud	Hérault		Georges Flandre
R3 - Sud	Pyrénées-Orientales	Louis Torcatis; Dominique Cayrol	
R4 - Sud-Ouest	Region	Delmas; Maurice Rousselier	
R4 - Sud-Ouest	Ariège	Joseph-Paul Rambaud	
R4 - Sud-Ouest	Haute-Garonne	Cmdr. Rigal	
R4 - Sud-Ouest	Tarn	Robert Rossi	
R5 - Limousin	Region		
R5 - Limousin	Corrèze	Martial Brigouleix	Marius Guédin (maquis); Louis Lemoigne (civilian)
R5 - Limousin	Creuse		Marcel Fleisser (maquis); Albert Fossey-François (maquis)
R5 - Limousin	Dordogne	Raymond Berggren; Mojzesz Goldman	Maurice Loupias (Bergeret, volunteer corps)
R5 - Limousin	Haute-Vienne	Yves Tavet	
R5 - Limousin	Indre	Capt. René Antoine (Carpy); Paul Mirguet	
R6 - Auvergne	Region	Jean Chappat	

== See also ==
- Resistance during World War II
- Liberation of France
- Maquis (World War II)
- Military history of France during World War II
- Free France
- Organisation de résistance de l'armée
- zone libre
- Francs-Tireurs et Partisans
- French Forces of the Interior
