= Claudius Billon =

Claudius Billon (13 February 1896 – 1 September 1944) was a captain in the French air force and the regional controller of the Armée secrète in Région R1 (Rhône) during World War II. He was captured by German police and sentenced to death. His body was never found.

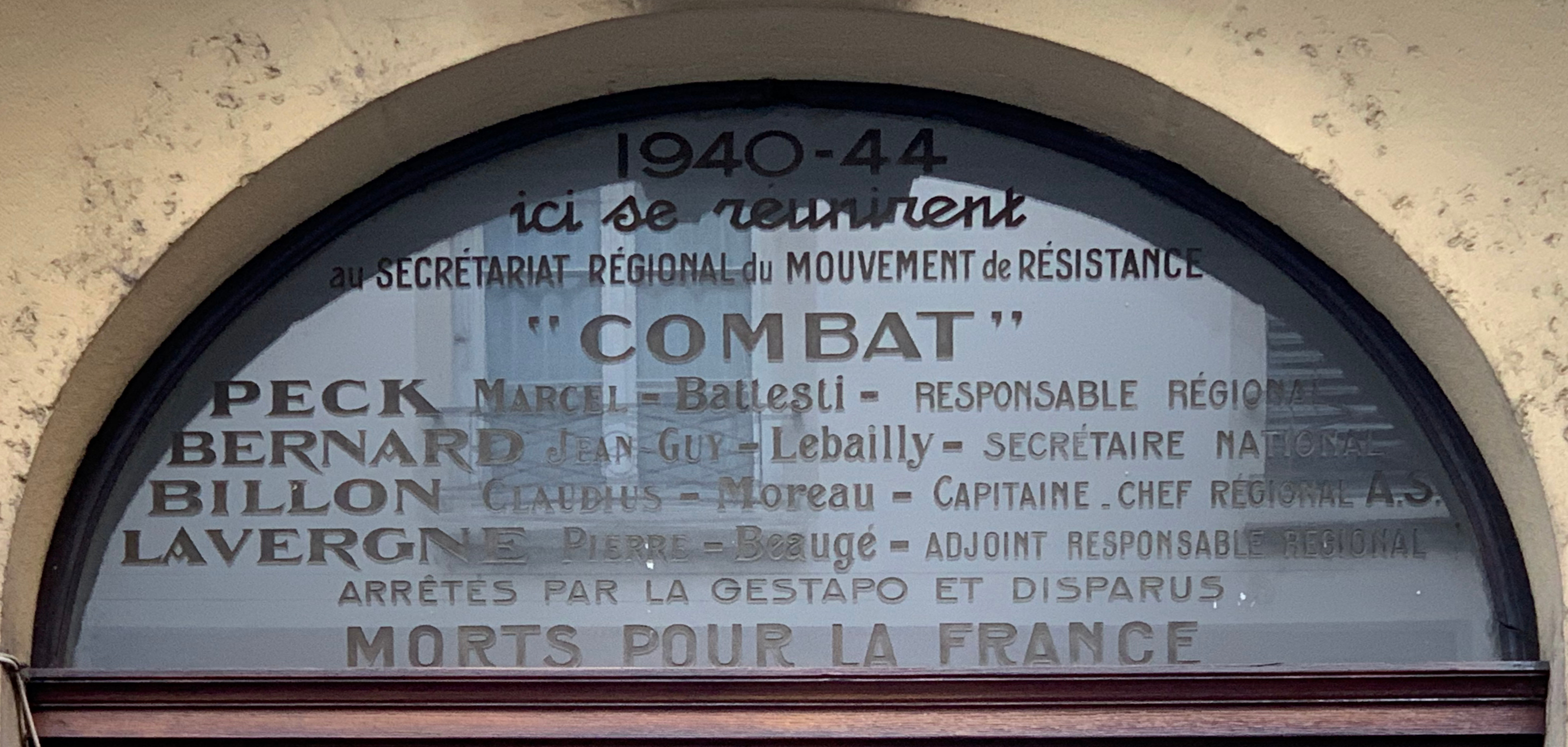
Billon's name at the location of the regional secretariat of Combat in Lyon

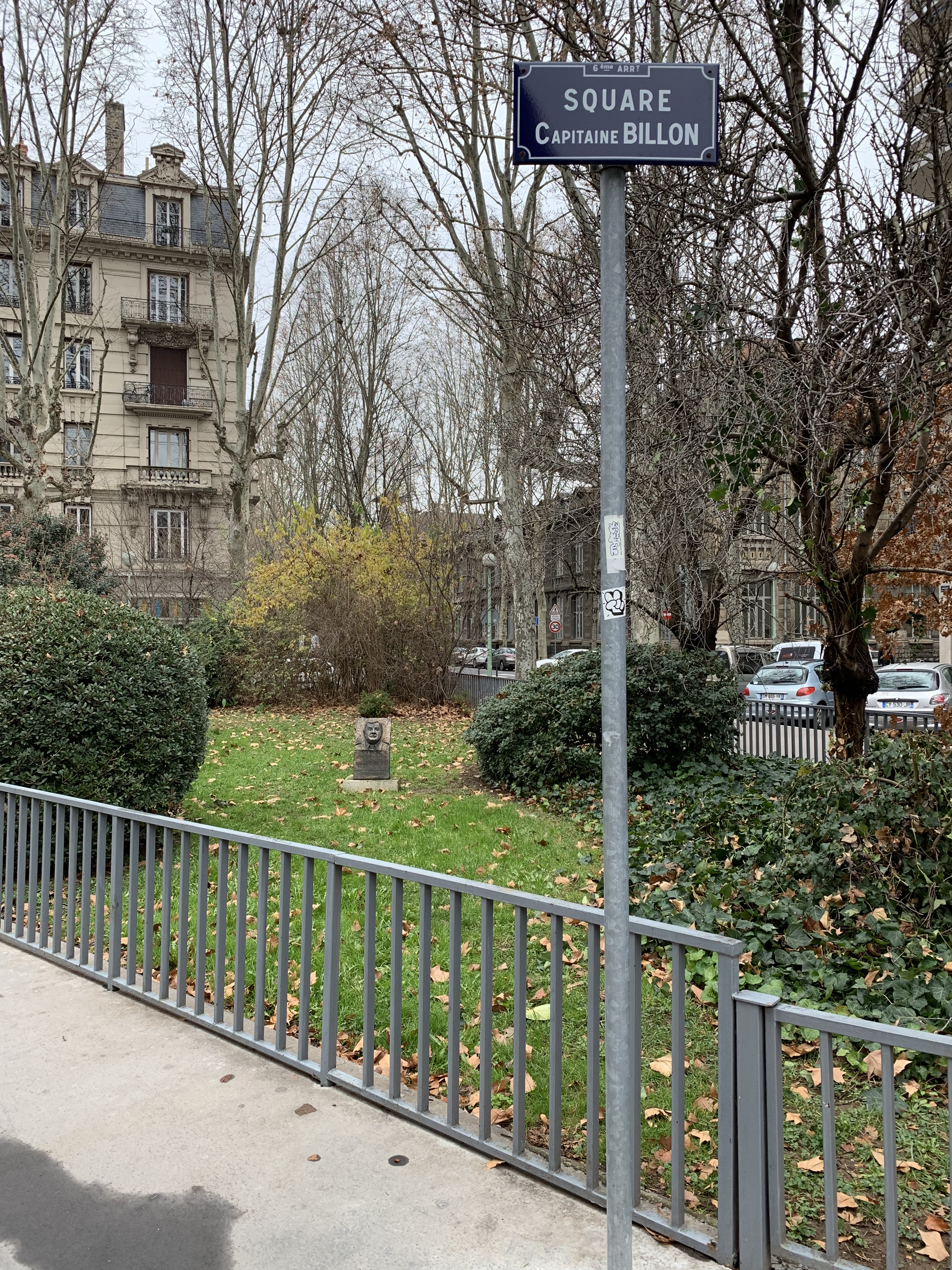
A park in Lyon in commemoration of Claudius Billon

== Biography ==
He was born on 13 February 1896, in Lyon, the son of Pierrette Brinet, a linen maker, and Claude Billon, a labourer. He enlisted as an infantryman during World War I and was strongly affected by the death of his older brother early in the War. In 1916, he fought in Verdun, where he was seriously injured. In 1917, he became an aviation warrant officer. In April 1919, he married his war godmother, Paule Vivenot Renée, in Neuville-sur-Saône (Rhône). The couple had a child and then divorced. In 1933, he was appointed second lieutenant and three years later lieutenant. He led the Dijon patrol at Bron in 1935, specialising in aerobatics. In 1939, he was promoted to captain; on 6 September, at the start of World War II he was assigned to Regional Fighter Group number 62. From 6 January to 17 August 1940, in Bron, he commanded a squadron of the III/9 Fighter Group.

After the French armistice with the Nazis, Billon failed to get to England. In Région R15, very early on in the Resistance, he worked with a Franco-Polish network. In 1941, he ran a small organisation in Bron for German troop surveillance, sabotage and to set up fuel depots. He was arrested in December that year but escaped from fr:Fort de la Vitriolerie a few days later. In the spring of 1942, Billon was a member of the Coq enchaîné group and Combat. They received the first parachute drop of weapons in the Region. Coq enchaîné established a link with London through “Commodore Alain” – to select drop sites. Under the authority of Marcel Peck, Billon organized and directed paramilitary combat groups, named L'Armée secrète (AS) by Henri Frenay. Frenay had suggested General Charles Delestraint – recalled from retirement – as a unifying commander to the regional leaders of the paramilitary groups of the three main resistance movements in the southern zone of France; they agreed unanimously. On 28 August 1942 in Lyon, Jean Moulin met Delestraint and made the three leaders available to him. Delestraint designated Captain Billon – because of his lack of affiliations and the others' limited military experience- as regional leader of the new AS in Région R1. A few months later, Delestraint was officially made head of the AS by General Charles de Gaulle in London. From September 1942, Billon formed the staff of the AS of Région R1, with one appointment made directly by Delestraint, R. Fornier, for Ain.

Sources differ, but he was arrested by the French police at the beginning of February 1943 and taken to Vichy. He reportedly escaped to Lyon, but was rearrested by German police and imprisoned at Montluc Prison.

He was sentenced to death on February 16, 1943. His body has never been found. Records indicate he was deported; a death certificate exists claiming he died in Germany on September 1, 1944, the death registered at the town hall of the 3rd arrondissement of Lyon on January 23, 1950, but it is not in the memorial book of the fr:Fondation pour la mémoire de la déportation (Foundation for the Memory of the Deportation). According to other sources, he committed suicide in prison in Saint-Étienne on February 19, 1943. He was declared Mort pour la France ("Dead for France") following the September 1944 death date.

== Commemoration ==
Billon's name is one of four engraved on the glazed transom at the entrance of 20 rue Vauban, Lyon, 6th arrondissement, the regional base of the Combat movement (see image). The Square du Capitaine Billon is a park lying at the apex of the Boulevard des Belges and the Avenue Anatole-France in Lyon's 6th arrondissement (see image).
