= Aubrac (surname) =

Aubrac is a surname. Notable people with the surname include:

- Lucie Aubrac (1912–2007), French history teacher and WWII Resistance member
- Raymond Aubrac (1914–2012), French Resistance leader
