= Libération (newspaper, 1941–1964) =

French newspaper

Libération (French pronunciation: [libeʁasjɔ̃]) was a French newspaper published between 1941 and 1964. Beginning as the clandestine newspaper of the resistance movement Libération-sud, the newspaper continued after World War II. Its editor belonged to the fellow traveller movement of the French Communist Party. In 1973, the title of the newspaper was reused by Jean-Paul Sartre and Serge July for their newspaper Libération.

== Secret beginnings ==
In July 1941, Jean Cavaillès and Emmanuel d'Astier de la Vigerie launched Libération, the clandestine newspaper for the Libération-Sud French Resistance. The editorial venture started with printing 10,000 copies for the first issue, cosigned by André Lassagne, Raymond Aubrac and Jean Cavaillès. Eventually reaching 200,000 copies printed per issue, it became one of the most important and most distributed Resistance newspapers, along with Combat. During the first six months of its existence, the writing was managed by John Rochon, who worked as an editor for La Montagne a daily in Clermont-Ferrand. From 1942 to April 1944, when he was arrested, the editor in chief was journalist Louis Martin-Chauffier. Just like the liberation movement itself, the writing came from a mix of men with diverse political views and backgrounds: socialists, communists, CGT syndicates and militant Christians. Amongst the first contributors were writers such as Anna Bellini, Lionel Brahic, David Wettel ou Pierre Savornin.
