= Mitterrand (disambiguation) =

François Mitterrand (1916–1996) was the President of France from 1981 until 1995.

Mitterrand may also refer to:

== Relatives of François Mitterrand ==
- Danielle Mitterrand (1924–2011), wife
- Frédéric Mitterrand (1947–2024), nephew, former Minister of Culture and Communication
- Henri Mitterand (1928–2021), French academic, author, critic, and editor
- Jean-Christophe Mitterrand (born 1946), son and political advisor
- Olivier Mitterrand (born 1943), nephew, business executive

== Others ==
- Jacques Mitterrand (1908–1991), French freemason and leftwing politician

== Similar spelling ==
- Alexandre Millerand (1859–1943), President of France from 1920 to 1924
