= Lucie Aubrac (film) =

- Directed by: Claude Berri
- Written by: Lucie Aubrac; Claude Berri
- Produced by: Pierre Grunstein
- Starring: Carole Bouquet; Daniel Auteuil
- Cinematography: Vincenzo Marano
- Edited by: Hervé de Luze
- Music by: Philippe Sarde
- Production company: October Films
- Distributed by: AMLF
- Release date: 25 February 1997
- Running time: 115 minutes
- Country: France
- Language: French

Lucie Aubrac is a 1997 French biopic of the World War II French Resistance member Lucie Aubrac. The film starred Carole Bouquet in the title role and was directed by Claude Berri. The story loosely follows the role of Lucie Aubrac and her husband during the Second World War and their parts in the resistance in Lyon. The film was entered into the 47th Berlin International Film Festival.

== Cast ==
- Carole Bouquet as Lucie Aubrac
- Daniel Auteuil as Raymond Aubrac
- Patrice Chéreau as Max (Jean Moulin)
- Eric Boucher as Serge
- Jean-Roger Milo as Maurice
- Heino Ferch as Klaus Barbie
- Jean Martin as Paul Lardanchet
- Andrzej Seweryn as Lt. Schlondorff
- Alain Maratrat as Lassagne
- Pascal Greggory as René Hardy
- Jean-Louis Richard as M. Henry
- Franck de la Personne as Aubry
- Bernard Verley as Charles-Henri
- Jacques Bonnaffé as Pascal

== Reception ==
The film opened in second place at the French box office behind fellow opener Mars Attacks! with a gross of $3.3 million for the week from 335 screens.

On review aggregator website Rotten Tomatoes, the film holds an approval rating of 74% based on 23 reviews, with an average rating of 6.7/10.
