= Bitter Victory =

1957 film by Nicholas Ray

- Original US film poster
- Directed by: Nicholas Ray
- Screenplay by: René Hardy; Nicholas Ray; Gavin Lambert; Paul Gallico (additional dialogue)
- Based on: Amère victoire 1956 novel by René Hardy
- Produced by: Paul Graetz
- Starring: Richard Burton; Curt Jürgens; Ruth Roman
- Cinematography: Michel Kelber
- Edited by: Léonide Azar
- Music by: Maurice Leroux
- Color process: Black and white
- Production companies: Transcontinental Films S.A. Robert Laffont Productions
- Distributed by: Columbia Pictures
- Release dates: 29 August 1957 (Venice FF); 20 November 1957 (France); 25 January 1958 (UK); 3 March 1958 (US)
- Running time: 102 minutes
- Countries: France; United States
- Language: English

Bitter Victory (French title Amère victoire) is a 1957 Franco-American international co-production drama war film, shot in CinemaScope and directed by Nicholas Ray. Set in World War II, it stars Richard Burton and Curt Jürgens as two British Army officers sent out on a commando raid in North Africa. Ruth Roman plays the former lover of one and the wife of the other. It is based on the novel of the same name by René Hardy.

== Plot ==
During the Western Desert Campaign of World War II, two Allied officers in Egypt are interviewed to lead a dangerous commando mission behind German lines in Benghazi. Major David Brand, a South African, is a regular army officer but lacks command and combat experience. He does not speak Arabic and has only a limited knowledge of Libya. Captain Jimmy Leith, a Welshman, is an amateur volunteer with extensive knowledge of the area who speaks Arabic. It is decided that both officers will go, with Major Brand in command. The men see Brand as a disciplinarian — "the only thing he's slept with is the rule book."

Major Brand's wife Jane is a Women's Auxiliary Air Force (WAAF) Flight Officer who enlisted to be near her husband. When Brand invites Leith to drinks with his wife, he picks up the fact that the two had had an affair before she married Brand. Leith had walked out on her without explanation.

The unit parachutes into Benghazi with the mission of attacking a German headquarters and bringing back secret plans from a safe to be opened by Wilkins, an experienced safecracker. Dressed as local civilians, Brand's hand shakes with fright when he has to knife a German sentry; the deed is done by Leith.

The mission is completed with the British suffering only one death and one man wounded. The patrol ambushes a German detachment, capturing Oberst Lutze, whom Brand knows to be responsible for the secret documents. Possibly in the hope of getting rid of Leith, Brand leaves him alone with two seriously wounded men, one British, one German. Leith decides to put them out of their pain. He shoots the German, who pleads for his life. The Briton encourages Leith to act quickly and get it over with. Leith puts his pistol to the soldier's head and fires but there are no bullets left. Rather than reloading, Leith picks the man up and sets out to carry him to safety. The man cries out in agony and curses Leith's failure, but dies before Leith puts him down again. Leith, whose Arab friend has joined him, then catches up with the rest of the unit.

The patrol is supposed to escape on camels but they discover the men left with them have been murdered and the camels taken. During the long march back across the desert, Brand's animosity towards Leith grows, not only due to the affair with his wife but to Brand's fear that Leith will reveal him as a coward to headquarters and destroy his career. While the group are resting, Brand sees a scorpion climb up the leg of Leith's trousers but does not warn him in time. When Leith is stung, Brand refrains from shooting him as his orders permit and lets him die in pain during a sandstorm. The men believe he killed him.

A patrol eventually picks up the group and takes them back to HQ. Brand's wife is distraught to learn of Leith's death and when Brand is immediately awarded the Distinguished Service Order, instead of congratulating him, she walks off disconsolate. In the closing shot Brand ruefully pins the medal on a stuffed training dummy.

== Cast ==
- Richard Burton as Captain Jim Leith
- Curd Jürgens as Major David Brand (as Curt Jürgens)
- Ruth Roman as Flight Officer Jane Brand
- Raymond Pellegrin as Mekrane
- Anthony Bushell as General Patterson
- Alfred Burke as Lieutenant Colonel Callander
- Sean Kelly as Lieutenant Barton
- Ramón de Larrocha as Lieutenant Sanders
- Christopher Lee as Sergeant Barney
- Ronan O'Casey as Sergeant Dunnigan
- Fred Matter as Colonel Lutze
- Raoul Delfosse as Lieutenant Kassel
- Andrew Crawford as Private Roberts
- Nigel Green as Lance Corporal Wilkins
- Harry Landis as Private Browning
- Christian Melsen as Private Abbot
- Sumner Williams as Private Anderson
- Joe Davray as Private Spicer

== Production and release ==
Although labelled a Franco-American co-production, Bitter Victory was mainly a French production, made by Transcontinental Films, the production company set up by German-born producer Paul Graetz (not to be confused with the German actor with the same name). The US co-production consisted of Columbia Pictures putting up some financing in return for worldwide distribution rights. The French financing came from the publisher Robert Laffont. Production started on 17 February 1957 and finished two months later. Much of the film was shot on location in Libya, with support from the British War Office and the British Army, while some interior scenes were done at the Victorine Studios, Nice, France.

Christopher Lee writes in his autobiography that upon arriving in Libya, all but the main stars essentially took part in a cast lottery for parts. Nobody was satisfied with the role they ended up with, particularly Raymond Pellegrin, who was stuck as an Arab guide who had only four lines. Lee says that the whole cast parted, "in the certain knowledge of having shared in a failure."

The film had its premiere at the 18th Venice Film Festival on 29 August 1957, where it competed for the Golden Lion award (which went to Satyajit Ray's Aparajito) as a French entry, but with English dialogue and Italian subtitles. The first general release was in France, on 20 November 1957.

The film's British distributors released a second version with the final scenes removed, cutting the film down from 101 minutes to 90. This version, released on 25 January 1958, ends with the arrival of help and Lutze setting fire to the documents. The British Board of Film Censors (predecessor of the British Board of Film Classification) required only minor cuts, which made Leith's execution of the wounded German less explicit. In 2006 British television aired the uncut version for the first time. The film was released in the United States on 3 March 1958, cut to 83 minutes.

== See also ==
- List of American films of 1957
- "Bitter Victory" (1988), a history of the July–August 1943 Allied invasion of Sicily by Carlo D'Este
