= Pierre Dejussieu-Pontcarral =

French military man

Pierre Dejussieu-Pontcarral (14 February 1898, Lyon – 1 August 1984, Paris) was a French military man who fought during World War I, and again during World War II when he became one of the leaders of French Resistance.

== Biography ==
Dejussieu-Pontcarral was a Second lieutenant by the end of the first World War, and was decorated for his actions during the Battle of Verdun. In the 1920s and 1930s he served in Tunisia, Morocco, China, and Indochina.

A recipient of the Grand Cross of the Legion of Honour and a member of the Order of Liberation, during the Second World War Dejussieu-Pontcarral became one of the founders of the French Resistance. He joined a combat section in 1941 and led the resistance in the Auvergne. On 20 July 1943 he was chosen to succeed general Charles Delestraint to lead the secret army in the southern zone. Arrested in May 1944 by the Gestapo, he was deported to Buchenwald and then to Mittelbau-Dora.

When he returned from Germany, he was appointed to a high position in the army in the area of Toulon-Nice; he became a general in 1957 and a commander of the land forces of NATO (1957-1958). Decorations he received include the French War Cross (1914-1918) and the French War Cross (1939-1945).
