= François-Yves Guillin =

French doctor and resistance fighter (1921–2020)

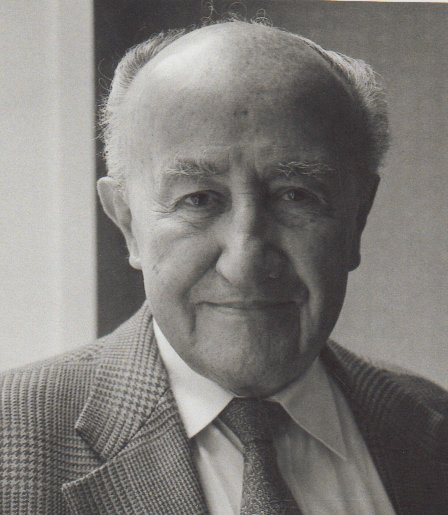
- François-Yves Guillin
- Born: 7 September 1921; Orléans, France
- Died: 18 October 2020 (aged 99); Sainte-Foy-lès-Lyon, France
- Occupations: Doctor; Historian

François-Yves Guillin (7 September 1921 – 18 October 2020) was a French resistance fighter, doctor, and historian.

== Biography ==
At the start of World War II, Guillin was a student at the Lycée Lalande in Bourg-en-Bresse, where he published Gaullist propaganda in 1940. In September of that year, he met General Charles Delestraint, who had taken refuge in Bourg-en-Bresse and began to recruit officers. In June 1941, Guillin began his medical studies. He left school the following year to join the French Resistance and began working as a liaison under the pseudonym Mercure. He then became Delestraint's personal secretary after the latter was appointed by Charles de Gaulle to lead the Armée secrète. Delestraint's arrest by the Gestapo in Paris on 9 June 1943, attempts to reach Guillin in Bourg-en-Bresse and Lyon were unsuccessful, and he joined the Maquis.

After the War, Guillin resumed his studies and pursued a career as a rheumatologist. Towards the end of his career, he pursued a doctorate in history. He defended a thesis on General Delestraint in 1992, and it was published in 1995.

François-Yves Guillin died on 18 October 2020 in Sainte-Foy-lès-Lyon at the age of 99.

== Publications ==
- Le général Delestraint en 1943 (1994)
- Le général Delestraint : premier chef de l'Armée secrète (1995)
- Les Lieux secrets de la Résistance : Lyon, 1940-1944 (2003)
- Le colonel Joseph Gastaldo, une vie de soldat (2005)
- Parcours 40/44 (2006)

== Distinctions ==
- Knight of the Legion of Honour
- Croix de Guerre 1939–1945
- Combatant's Cross
- Knight of the Ordre des Palmes académiques
