= Lucie Aubrac =

Member of the French Resistance in World War II (1912–2007)

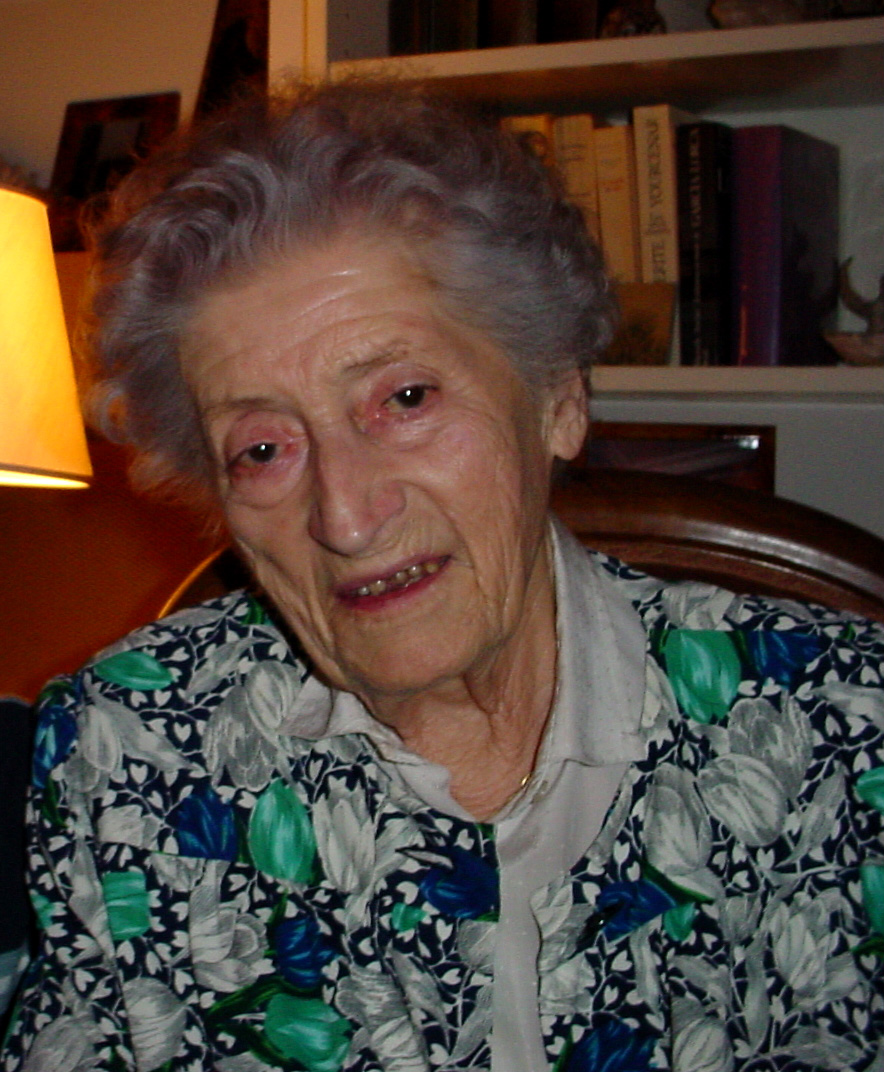
- Lucie Aubrac in 2003
- Born: Lucie Bernard; 29 June 1912; Mâcon, France
- Died: 14 March 2007 (aged 94); Issy-les-Moulineaux, France
- Resting place: Salornay-sur-Guye
- Occupations: Member of the French Resistance, member of the Provisional Consultative Assembly in Paris, history teacher
- Political party: French Communist Party
- Spouse: Raymond Aubrac (1939–2007; her death)
- Children: 3 (son Jean-Pierre, daughters Catherine and Élisabeth)
- Awards: Legion of Honor

Lucie Samuel (née Bernard; 29 June 1912 – 14 March 2007), known as Lucie Aubrac (French: [lysi obʁak]), was a member of the French Resistance in World War II. A history teacher by occupation, she earned a history agrégation in 1938, a highly uncommon achievement for a woman at that time. In 1939 she married Raymond Samuel, who took the name Aubrac in the Resistance. She was active on a number of operations, including prison breakouts. Like her husband, she was a communist activist, which she remained after the war. She sat in the Provisional Consultative Assembly in Paris from 1944 to 1945.

Her life was depicted in the 1997 film Lucie Aubrac by Claude Berri. The Paris Métro station Bagneux–Lucie Aubrac is named after her.

== Career ==
In 1940, Lucie was amongst the first to join the French Resistance. In Clermont-Ferrand, Emmanuel d'Astier de La Vigerie formed the Resistance group La Dernière Colonne, later known as Libération-sud, with her husband and Jean Cavaillès. During 1941, the group carried out two sabotage attacks at train stations in Perpignan and Cannes. In February, they organised the distribution of 10,000 propaganda flyers, but one of the distributors was caught by the police, leading to the arrest of d'Astier's niece and uncle. At this time, Lucie gave birth to her first child. The group decided to hide, and, after a few months' hiatus, began to work on an underground newspaper, Libération. The first edition was put together with the help of the typographers from a local newspaper and printed on paper supplied by local trade-unionists; 10,000 copies were produced in July 1941.

In March 1943, Raymond was arrested. He was released in May, after Lucie intervened with the local Vichy public prosecutor, telling him they were members of the Résistance and he had 24 hours to release Raymond or be killed, and the couple then organized the clever escape of three other members of their group. A month later, Raymond was arrested again. Lucie went to see Klaus Barbie, the notorious Gestapo chief in Vichy France and claimed to be Raymond's fiancée, saying he was named "Ermelin" (one of his aliases) and had been caught in a raid while innocently visiting a doctor. She was told Raymond was to be executed for being a member of the Resistance, but she was able to get permission to marry him first, supposedly to save her honor and legitimize the child with which she really was pregnant. When Raymond was being brought back to prison after "wedding", he and fifteen other prisoners were rescued by a commando unit led by Lucie, who attacked the vehicle he was in, killing the six guards.

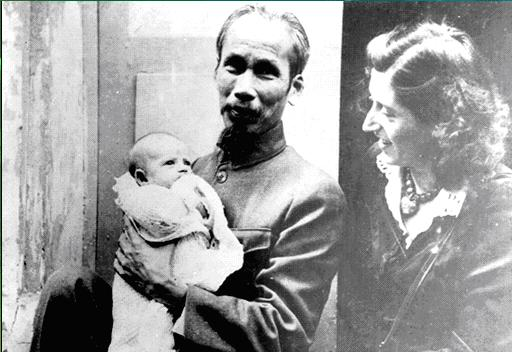
Ho Chi Minh, baby Elizabeth Aubrac and Lucie Aubrac, 1946

In 1944, Charles de Gaulle established a consultative assembly, which Lucie joined as a resistance representative, making her the first woman to sit on a French parliamentary assembly. In 1945, she published the first short history of the French Resistance. In 1946, she and Raymond hosted Ho Chi Minh at their home when he went to France on what turned out to be an unsuccessful mission to win independence for the then-French colony of Vietnam, and Ho Chi Minh and Raymond became friends.

In 1984, Lucie published a semi-fictional version of her wartime diaries, the English translation of which is known as Outwitting the Gestapo. She was inspired to publish her own writing on the war by Klaus Barbie's claim that her husband Raymond had become an informer and betrayed Jean Moulin after his arrest. In 1985, she sat on the "Jury of Honor" to assess whether the documentary Des terroristes à la retraite should be aired. Aubrac hated the film, which she called "misery loving", complaining it dwelled on all that was ugly in France. The 1992 film Boulevard des hirondelles was about her and Raymond's life during the French Resistance.

In 1996, Lucie was awarded the Legion of Honor by the French government for her heroism during World War II. The 1997 film Lucie Aubrac, which stars Carole Bouquet as Lucie, is about her efforts to rescue her husband. She herself endorsed the film.

In April 1997, Jacques Vergès produced the "Barbie testament", which he claimed Klaus Barbie had given him ten years earlier, that purported to show the Aubracs had tipped off Barbie regarding Moulin. Vergès' "Barbie testament" was timed for the publication of the book Aubrac Lyon 1943 by Gérard Chauvy, which was meant to prove the Aubracs were the ones who informed Barbie about the fateful meeting at Caluire where Moulin was arrested in 1943. On 2 April 1998, following a civil suit launched by the Aubracs, a Paris court fined Chauvy and his publisher Albin Michel for "public defamation". In 1998, the French historian Jacques Baynac, in his book Les Secrets de l'affaire Jean Moulin, claimed Moulin was planning to break with de Gaulle to recognize General Giraud, which led the Gaullists to tip off Barbie before this could happen. Twenty leading resistance survivors published a letter protesting against the accusations against the Aubracs, who asked to appear before a panel of leading French historians. The Aubracs did appear in a discussion with historians, organized by the newspaper Libération. While none of the historians involved believed that Raymond was an informer, they did note inconsistencies in Lucie's account of his case.

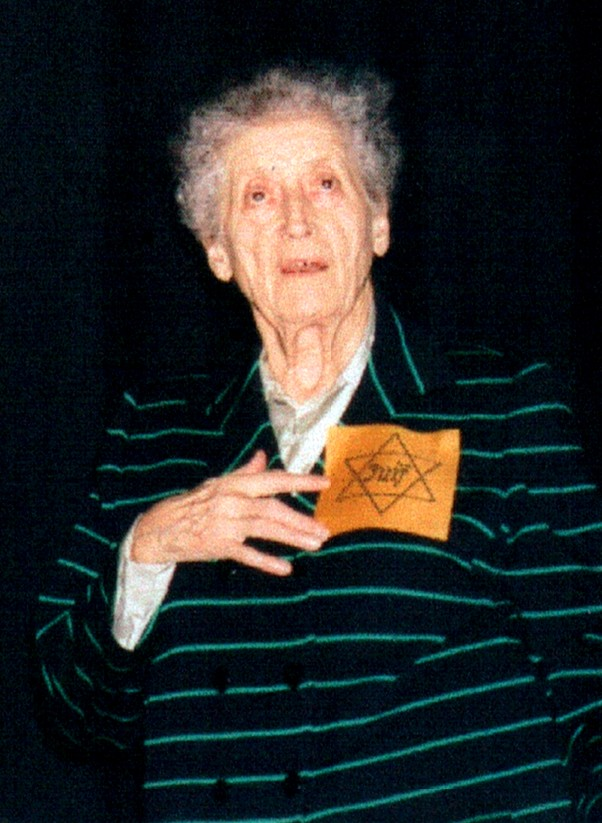
Lucie Aubrac in 2001

Patrick Marnham's biography of Moulin, The Death of Jean Moulin: Biography of a Ghost (2001) suggests Raymond and possibly Lucie betrayed Moulin. In his book Resistance and Betrayal: The Death and Life of the Greatest Hero of the French Resistance (2002), Marnham suggested that, because Raymond's overriding allegiance was to Communism, he would not have considered himself a traitor if he had betrayed Moulin, claiming that French Communists such as the Aubracs at times gave non-Communists, such as Moulin, to the Gestapo.

Lucie had three children with Raymond. Charles de Gaulle was godfather to their second child, Catherine and Ho Chi Minh was godfather to their third child, Elizabeth.

President Nicolas Sarkozy, in a statement after Raymond's death in 2012, said that Raymond's escape from the Nazis led by Lucie in 1943 had "become a legend in the history of the Resistance", and praised him and all Resistance members as "heroes of the shadows who saved France's honor, at a time when it seemed lost". Serge Klarsfeld, the president of the Sons and Daughters of Jewish Deportees from France, said to BFM-TV that Raymond and Lucie "were a legendary couple" and "exceptional people". François Hollande said in a statement: "In our darkest times, [Raymond] was, with Lucie Aubrac, among the righteous, who found, in themselves and in the universal values of our Republic, the strength to resist Nazi barbarism". Lucie's ashes are beside Raymond's in the family tomb in the cemetery in the Burgundian village of Salornay-sur-Guye.
