= Olivier Mitterrand =

French business executive

Olivier Mitterrand (born 1943) is a French business executive and the CEO of Les Nouveaux Constructeurs. He is the nephew of former French President François Mitterrand and the brother of the Minister of Culture, Frédéric Mitterrand.

He is a graduate of the École Polytechnique and Harvard Business School. In 1969, he worked for Générale de Location, and for Compagnie de La Hénin in 1971. In 1972, he founded Les Nouveaux Constructeurs, a real-estate company.

In April 2010, he became Officer of the Légion d'honneur.

== Biography ==
Olivier Robert Léon Mitterrand was born on July 17, 1943, in the 15th arrondissement of Paris, to Robert Mitterrand (brother of François Mitterrand) and Édith Cahier. He is the older brother of Frédéric Mitterrand .

His marriage to Édith Breguet, granddaughter of aircraft manufacturer Louis Charles Breguet (1880-1955), produced two children, Louis-David and Marie. He married Anne-Marie Hubin, his second wife, whose two children from a previous marriage, Vendémiaire and Antigone, he adopted, and with whom he later had two children, Moïse and Maël Mitterrand. He married Valentine Gay, publisher and founder of Globe Publishing, mother of his stepson Harold, in his third marriage.
