= Jean Moulin =

French Resistance hero (1899–1943)

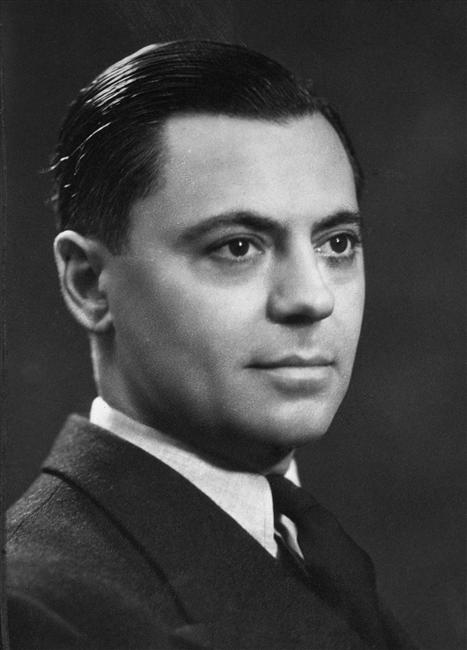
- Moulin in 1937
- Born: Jean Pierre Moulin; 20 June 1899; Béziers, France
- Died: 8 July 1943 (aged 44); Near Metz, occupied France
- Resting place: Panthéon, Paris
- Occupation: Prefect
- Known for: First president of the National Council of the Resistance (1943)
- Parent(s): Antoine-Émile Moulin; Blanche Élisabeth Pègue

Signature
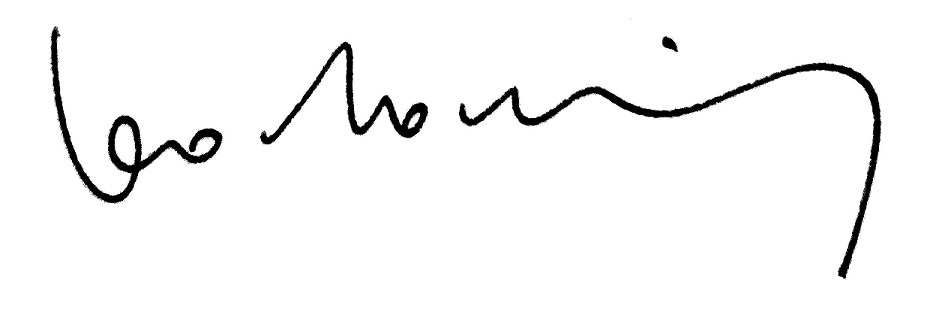

Jean Pierre Moulin (French: [ʒɑ̃ mulɛ̃]; 20 June 1899 – 8 July 1943) was a French civil servant and French Resistance leader who succeeded in unifying the main networks of the Resistance in World War II. He served as the first president of the National Council of the Resistance (CNR) from 27 May 1943 until he was killed less than two months later.

A prefect of the Aveyron (1937–1939) and Eure-et-Loir (1939–1940) departments, Moulin is remembered today for his leadership within the Resistance under Charles de Gaulle's government-in-exile in London. He was tortured by German officer Klaus Barbie while in Gestapo custody. His death was registered at Metz railway station as he was being transferred to Germany.

In 1964, Moulin's remains were transferred to the Panthéon. Culture Minister André Malraux spoke on the occasion in what would become one of the most famous speeches in French history.

== Early life ==
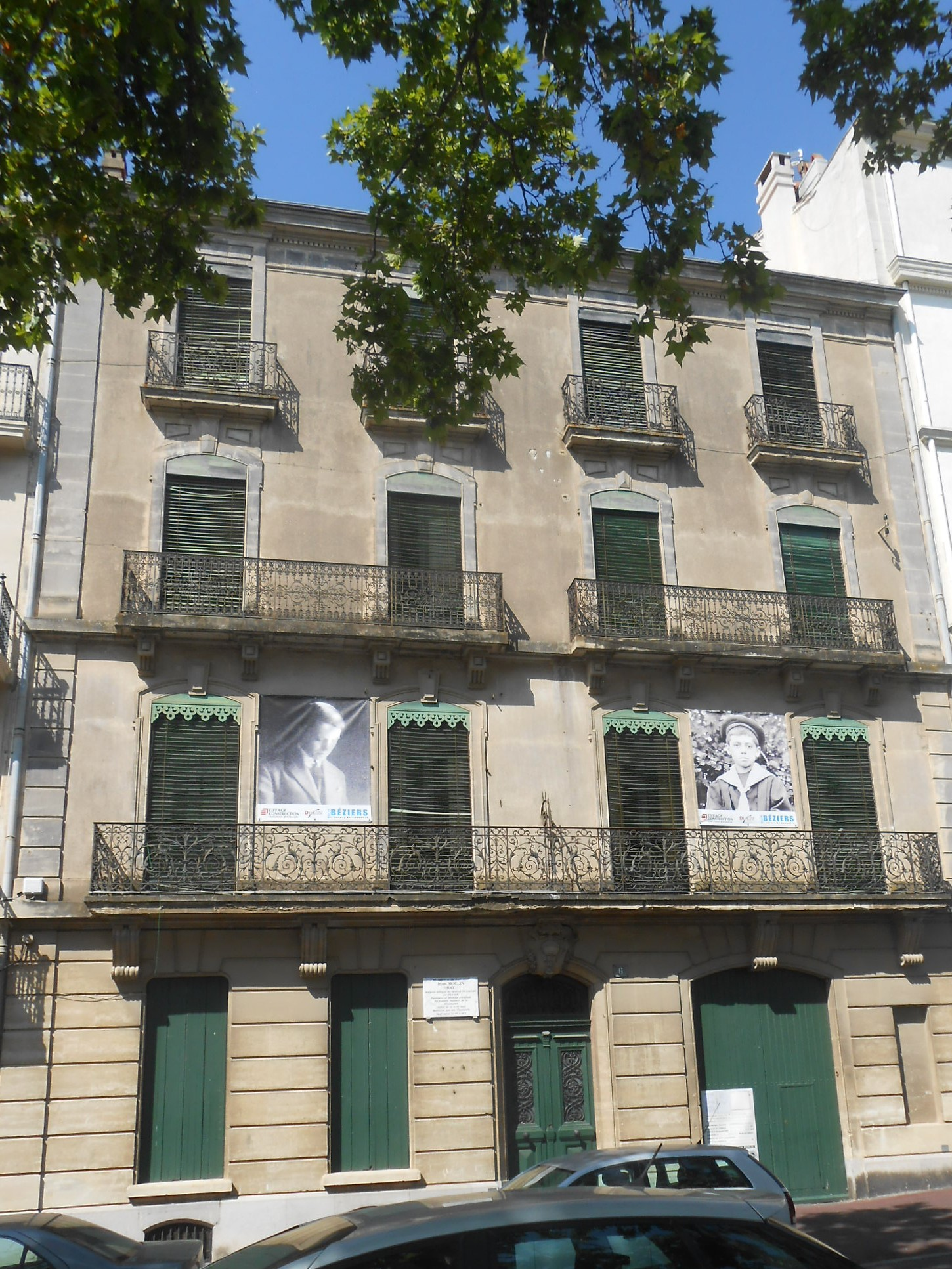
Birthplace of Jean Moulin in Béziers

Jean Moulin was born at 6 Rue d'Alsace in Béziers, Hérault, son of Antoine-Émile Moulin and Blanche Élisabeth Pègue. He was the grandson of an insurgent opposing the coup d'état of 2 December 1851. His father was a lay teacher at the Université Populaire and a Freemason at the lodge Action Sociale.

Moulin was baptised on 6 August 1899 in the church of Saint-Vincentin in Saint-Andiol (Bouches-du-Rhône), the village his parents came from. He spent an uneventful childhood in the company of his brother, Joseph, and his sister, Laure. Joseph died of acute peritonitis in 1907.^{:27} Throughout his early years, Moulin was an average student, including at the Lycée Henri IV in Béziers. One of his report cards states that "he would be an excellent student, if he were ever to start working."^{:33}

In 1917, he enrolled at the Faculty of Law of Montpellier, where he was not a brilliant student though he did finish his legal studies with a diploma.^{:33} However, thanks to the influence of his father, he was appointed as attaché to the cabinet of the prefect of Hérault under the presidency of Raymond Poincaré.

== Military service during World War I ==
Moulin was mobilised on 17 April 1918 as part of the age class of 1919, the last class to be mobilised in France. He was assigned to the 2nd Engineer Regiment of Montpellier. At the beginning of September, after an accelerated training, he headed with his regiment to the front in the Vosges, where he was posted to the village of Socourt.^{:43}

His regiment was preparing to go to the front lines as part of the attack planned by Foch for 13 November, but the Armistice was signed on 11 November.^{:43}

Although Moulin did not fight directly on the front lines, he was nevertheless in a position to observe the horrors of war. He saw its aftermath on the battle fields and the devastation of villages. He helped to bury the war dead in the region around Metz.^{:47} He wrote home expressing his shock at seeing the starved state of British prisoners of war who had just been freed. Nevertheless, nothing in the documented history of Jean Moulin's experience during World War I hinted at what his role would be during World War II.^{:34–35}

While still enlisted after the War, he was posted successively to Seine-et-Oise, Verdun and Chalon-sur-Saône. He worked as a carpenter, a digger and later a telephonist for the 7th and 9th Engineer Regiments.

He was de-mobilised in November and, on 4 November 1919, resumed his post as attaché to the préfecture of Hérault, in Montpellier.^{:52}

== Interwar years ==
After World War I, Moulin resumed his studies of law. His position as attaché at the préfecture of Hérault allowed him to finance his university studies while also providing a useful apprenticeship in politics and government. He obtained his law degree in July 1921^{:52}. He then entered the prefectural administration as chief of staff to the deputy of Savoie in 1922 and then sous-préfet of Albertville from 1925 to 1930.

After his proposal of marriage to Jeanette Auran was rejected, Moulin, then aged 27, married a 19-year-old professional singer, Marguerite Cerruti, in the town of Betton-Bettonet in September 1926. The marriage did not last long. Cerruti quickly became bored and Moulin responded by offering her further singing lessons in Paris, where she disappeared for two days. Biographer Patrick Marnham cites one of the causes of the divorce being Moulin's mother-in-law, who had wanted to prevent her estate passing into Moulin's control upon Cerruti's 21st birthday. Moulin attempted to hide this rejection by excusing his wife's disappearances and not informing his family until after his divorce.

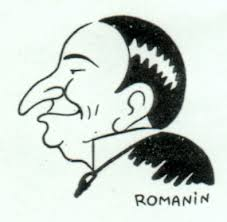
Caricature of Georges Mandel by Jean Moulin, under his pseudonym, Romanin

Moulin was appointed sous-préfet of Châteaulin, Brittany in 1930. At the same time, he published political cartoons in the newspaper Le Rire under the pseudonym Romanin. He also illustrated books by the Breton poet Tristan Corbière, including an etching for La Pastorale de Conlie, Corbière's poem about Camp Conlie where many Boon soldiers died in 1870 during the Franco-Prussian War. He also made friends with the Breton poets Saint-Pol-Roux in Camaret and Max Jacob in Quimper.

In 1932, Pierre Cot, a Radical-Socialist politician, named Moulin his second in command or chef adjoint when he was serving as Foreign Minister under Paul Doumer's presidency. In 1933, Moulin was appointed sous-préfet of Thonon-les-Bains, parallel to his function of head of Cot's cabinet in the Air Ministry under President Albert Lebrun. On 19 January 1934, Moulin was appointed sous-préfet of Montargis, but he did not assume the office and chose to remain under Cot. In the first half of April, Moulin was appointed to the Seine préfecture and, on 1 July, he took his place as secretary general in Somme, in Amiens. In 1936, he was once more named chief of cabinet of Cot's Air Ministry of the Popular Front. In that capacity, Moulin was involved in Cot's efforts to assist the Second Spanish Republic by sending it planes and pilots. For the Istres-Damas-Le Bourget race, he presented the winners with their prize; Benito Mussolini's son was one of those winners. He became France's youngest préfet in the Aveyron département, based in the commune of Rodez, in January 1937. It has been claimed that during the Spanish Civil War, Moulin assisted with the shipment of arms from the Soviet Union to Spain. A more commonly accepted version of events is that he used his position in the French air ministry to deliver planes to the Spanish Republican forces.

== Experience as prefect during the early part of World War II ==
In January 1939, Moulin was appointed prefect of the Eure-et-Loir department, based in Chartres. After war against Germany was declared, he asked multiple times to be demoted because "[his] place is not at the rear, at the head of a rural departement". Against the advice of the Minister of the Interior, he asked to be transferred to the military school of Issy-Les-Moulineaux, near Paris. The minister forced him to return to Chartres, where the War quickly made its way to him in the form of German air strikes and columns of distressed and sometimes wounded refugees. As the Germans approached Chartres, he wrote to his parents, "If the Germans – who are capable of anything – make me say dishonorable words, you already know, it is not the truth". In mid-June, German troops entered Chartres.

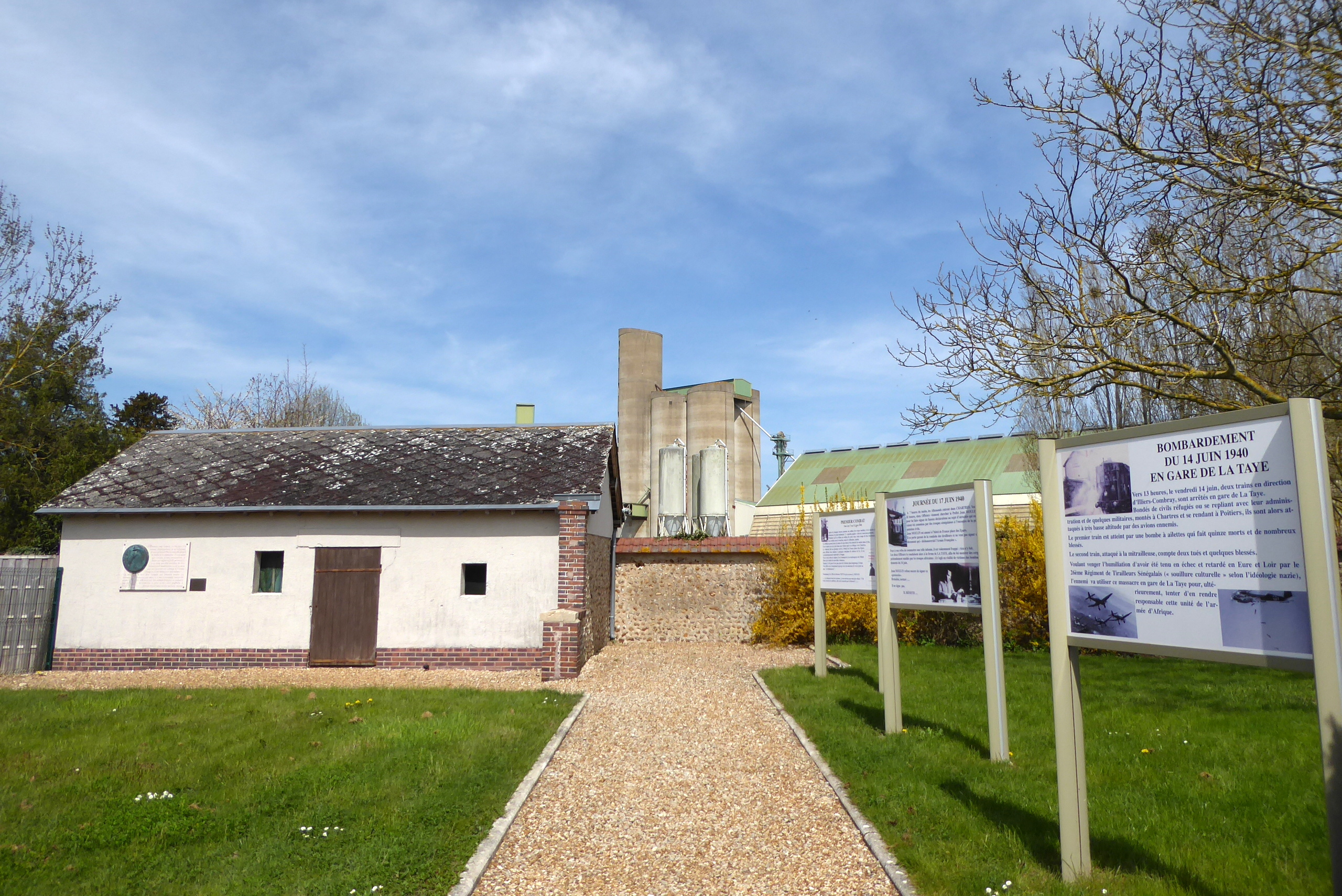
House where Moulin was tortured in La Taye, Saint-Georges-sur-Eure in the Eure-et-Loire department

Moulin was arrested by the Germans on 17 June 1940 because he refused to sign a false declaration that three Senegalese tirailleurs had committed atrocities, killing civilians in La Taye. In fact, those civilians had been killed by German bombings.

Beaten and imprisoned because he refused to comply, Moulin attempted suicide. The suicide attempt did not succeed because he was discovered by a guard and taken to a hospital for treatment.

Because he was a Radical, he was dismissed by the Vichy regime, led by Marshal Philippe Pétain on 2 November 1940, along with other left-wing préfets. He then began writing his diary, First Battle, in which he relates his resistance against the Nazis in Chartres, which was later published at the Liberation and prefaced by de Gaulle.

== The Resistance ==
Having decided not to collaborate, Moulin left Chartres for his parents' home town, Saint-Andiol, Bouches-du-Rhône, and joined the French Resistance, specifically, the organisation Free France. Under the name Joseph Jean Mercier, he went to Marseille, where he met other résistants, including Henri Frenay and Antoine Sachs.

Moulin travelled to London in September 1941 after passing through Spain and Portugal. He was received on 24 October by Charles de Gaulle, who wrote about Moulin, "A great man. Great in every way".

Moulin summarised the state of the French Resistance to de Gaulle. Part of the Resistance considered him too ambitious, but de Gaulle had confidence in his network and skills. He gave Moulin the assignment of co-ordinating and unifying the various Resistance groups, a difficult mission that would take time and effort to accomplish. On 1 January 1942, Moulin parachuted into the Alpilles and met with the leaders of the resistance groups, under the codenames Rex and Max:

- Henri Frenay (Combat)
- Emmanuel d'Astier (Libération)
- Jean-Pierre Lévy (Francs-tireurs)
- Pierre Villon (Front national, not to be confused with the later political party of the same name)
- Pierre Brossolette (Comité d'action socialiste)

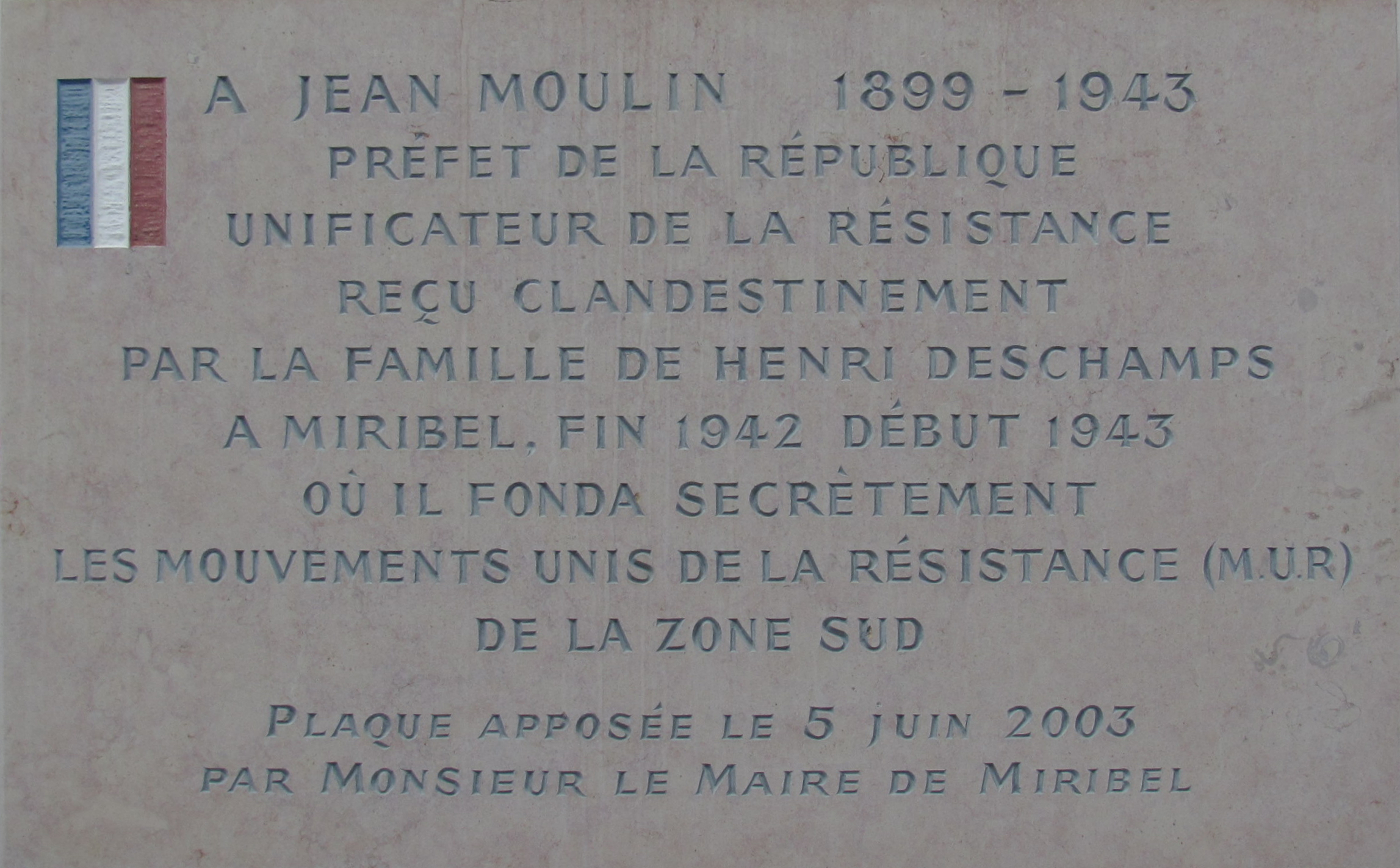
Plaque commemorating the creation of the United Resistance Movement (MUR is French acronym) in the town of Miribel in January 1943

He succeeded to the extent that the first three of these resistance leaders and their groups came together to form the United Resistance Movement (Mouvements Unis de la Résistance, MUR) in January 1943. The next month, Moulin returned to London, accompanied by Charles Delestraint, who led the new Armée secrète, which grouped together the MUR's military wings. Moulin left London on 21 March 1943, with orders to unify the French resistance by forming the National Resistance Council (Conseil national de la Résistance); CNR). Again, this was a difficult task since the other resistance movements, besides the three already in the MUR, wanted to retain their independence.

== Creation of the Conseil National de la Résistance ==
Moulin succeeded in this task by obtaining unanimous adoption of a unified ‘Program’ and recognition of Charles de Gaulle as their leader by disparate elements of the French resistance, including by various resistance units as well as by outlawed labour unions and political parties. Because he was known as a left-wing republican, he also succeeded in obtaining the cooperation of the Communist resistance groups, which had been reluctant to accept de Gaulle as their leader. The unifying Program was set forth in a document called the 'Program of the National Council of the Resistance.'

Adopted on March 15, 1944,:^{62–63} the Program is a text of fewer than ten pages. It consists of two parts: an "immediate action plan", which concerns resistance action prior to the Liberation of France. The second part describes "measures to be applied after the territory is liberated", a kind of government program describing how Nazi influence should be purged from French society as well as longer-term measures, such as the restoration of universal suffrage, liberty of the press, the right to unionise and social security. The first meeting of the CNR took place in Paris on 27 May 1943. The meeting was attended by representatives of eight resistance movements, two major labour unions and the six most important political parties of the Third Republic.

This show of unity consolidated the position of de Gaulle vis-à-vis the allied forces, who were considering a plan to administer post-War France themselves. The Conseil National de la Résistance – by bringing together (both symbolically and as a context for meetings) major resistance units, labour unions and political parties – enhanced the credibility of the French Resistance as a unified movement. With Charles de Gaulle as its recognised head, it also fortified de Gaulle’s position as a national leader who could govern France after the war. Thus, while it is not clear that the CNR actually managed to create a unified military force from the various resistance movements, it did play a role in consolidating the role of France as a politically and militarily viable force within post-War French society and as ally of the Allied Forces.

In his work in shepherding the Resistance, Moulin was aided by his private administrative assistant, Laure Diebold.

== Betrayal and death ==
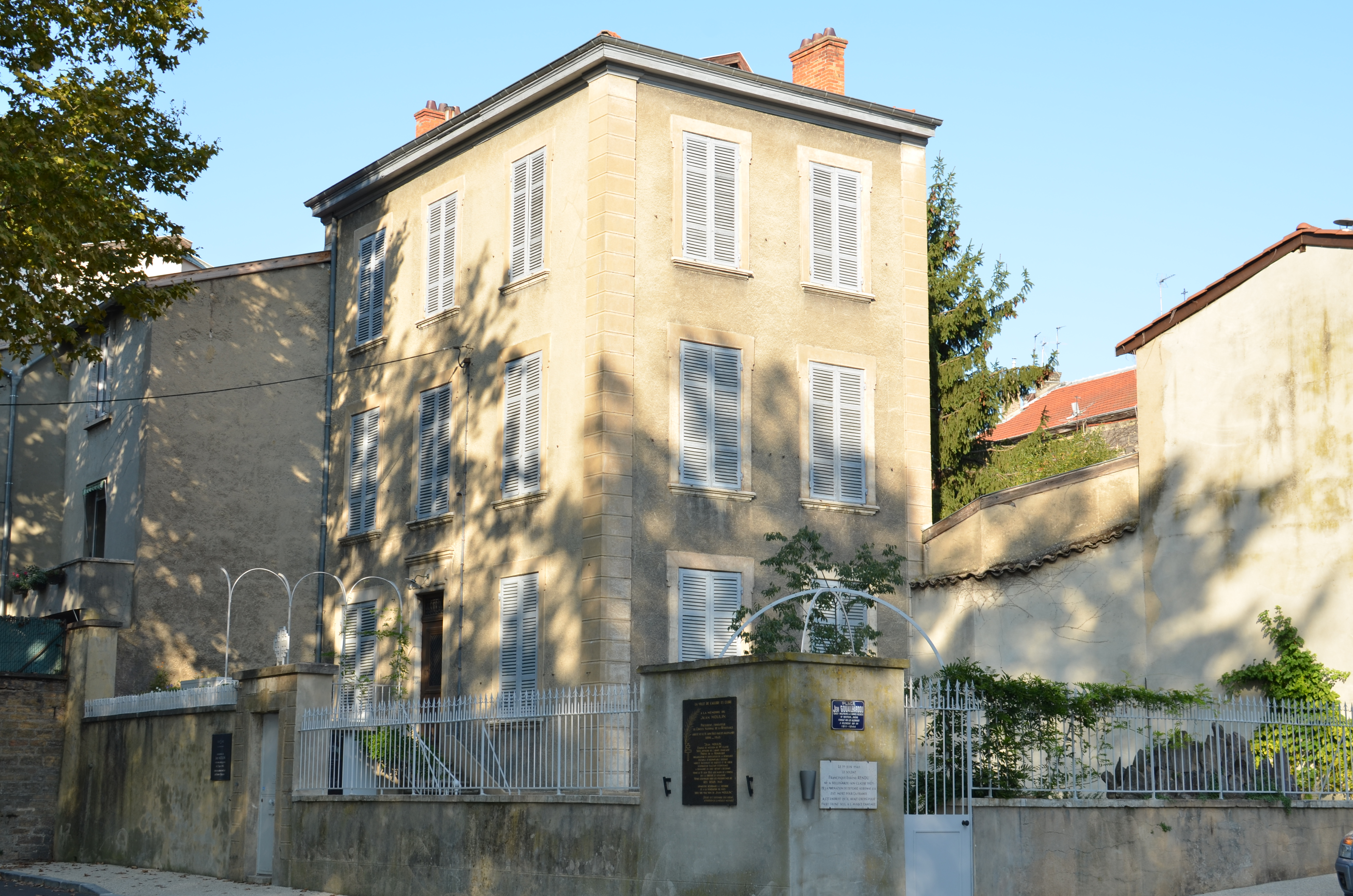
The house of Dr. Dugoujon, where Jean Moulin was arrested in 1943

On 21 June 1943, Moulin was arrested by the Sicherheitsdienst (a branch of the Nazi Secret Service) while holding a meeting with fellow Resistance leaders in the home of Dr. Frédéric Dugoujon in Caluire-et-Cuire, a suburb of Lyon, as were Dugoujon, Henri Aubry (alias Avricourt and Thomas), Raymond Aubrac, Bruno Larat (alias Xavier-Laurent Parisot), André Lassagne (alias Lombard), Colonel Albert Lacaze and Colonel Émile Schwarzfeld (alias Blumstein). René Hardy (alias Didot), a member of the resistance movement Combat and a specialist in railroads, was also present for reasons that are not clear and in what appears to have been a breach of good security practice.^{:157}

Moulin and the other Resistance leaders were sent to Montluc Prison in Lyon (but not René Hardy, who either escaped or was allowed to flee). They were detained there until the beginning of July. While there, he was tortured by Klaus Barbie, head of the Gestapo in Lyon and, later, briefly in Paris. According to witnesses, Moulin and his men had their fingernails removed using hot needles as spatulas. In addition, his fingers were placed in the door frame of the interrogation cell, with the door then repeatedly closed until his knuckles were shattered. They increasingly tightened his handcuffs until they penetrated the skin, breaking the bones in his wrists. He was beaten until his face was unrecognizable and he fell into a coma.

After the torture sessions, Barbie ordered that Moulin be displayed as an object lesson to other imprisoned members of the Resistance. The last time he was seen alive he was still in a coma, his head swollen and yellow from bruising and wrapped in bandages, according to the description given by Christian Pineau, fellow prisoner and member of the Resistance. There is some uncertainty surrounding the exact circumstances of Moulin's death, including about the view that he died while being transported by train to Germany. According to his death certificate (established by the occupying force), he died near or in the train station of Metz, but there are conflicting reports as to when and where he actually died.^{:429,}

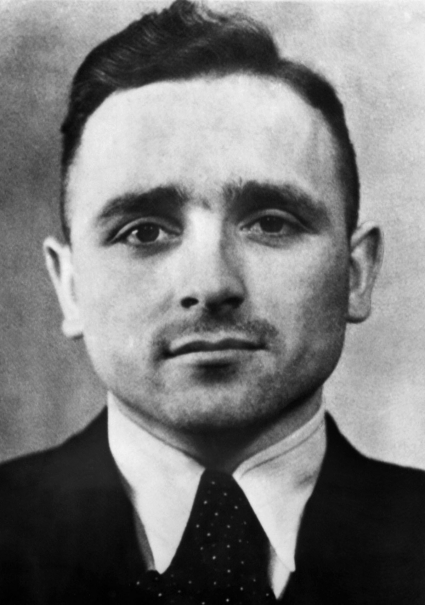
Klaus Barbie, head of the Sicherheitsdienst (a branch of the Nazi Secret Service) in Lyon when Jean Moulin was arrested

== Theories about who betrayed Moulin ==
The question of who betrayed Jean Moulin has attracted a great deal of research, speculation, judicial scrutiny and media coverage. Many members of the French Resistance who could have provided first-hand accounts were killed during the War. Furthermore, internecine tensions within the Resistance movement are well documented and have left fertile ground for speculation about who within the movement might have provided the information to the Nazis.

Regarding Moulin's arrest, suspicions have focused on Resistance member René Hardy, who, prior to accusations that he betrayed Moulin, was known to be a reliable Resistance fighter. Hardy was arrested on 7 June 1943 by the Sicherheitsdienst on the Paris-Lyon night train. This arrest took place in the context of a wave of arrests of resistance fighters, including Resistance leader General Charles Delestraint. After his arrest, Hardy was subjected to torture or threats of torture. It is suspected, and some Nazi documentation supports this, that he became a Nazi agent after his arrest. In any case, at the insistence of many of his colleagues in the Resistance, Hardy was present at the house in Caluire-et-Cuire at the time of Moulin's arrest.^{:404–409} However, either Hardy escaped or was allowed to flee. He was injured during the escape (though some suspected that the wound was self-inflicted), and he also managed to escape from his hospital, scaling a high wall despite having his arm in a cast. In two post-war trials that examined his alleged role in the arrest, Hardy was acquitted for lack of evidence.^{:404–409}

Communists have also been the target of allegations, though no hard evidence has ever backed up that claim. Marnham looked into these assertions but found no evidence to support them (although Communist Party members could easily have seen Moulin as a "fellow traveller" because he had communist friends and supported the Republican side in the Spanish Civil War). As préfet, Moulin even ordered the repression of communist 'agitators' and went so far as to have police keep some of them under surveillance. At the trial of Klaus Barbie in 1987, his lawyer, Jacques Vergès, made much out of speculation that Moulin was betrayed by either Communists and/or Gaullists as part of an attempt to distract attention away from the actions of his client, by making the true authors of Moulin's arrest his fellow résistants, rather than Barbie. Vergès failed in his effort to acquit Barbie but succeeded in creating a vast industry of various conspiracy theories, many very fanciful, about who betrayed Moulin. Leading historians, such as Henri Noguères and Jean-Pierre Azéma, rejected Vergès's conspiracy theories under which Barbie was somehow less culpable than the supposed traitors who tipped him off.

The British intelligence officer Peter Wright, in his 1987 book Spy Catcher, wrote that Pierre Cot was an "active Russian agent" and called his protégé Moulin a "dedicated Communist". Clinton wrote that Wright based his allegations against Moulin entirely on secret documents that he claimed to have seen but which no historian has ever seen, and on conversations that he is supposed to have had decades ago with others long dead, which made his case against Moulin very "dubious". Henri-Christian Giraud, the grandson of General Henri Giraud (who had been outmaneuvered by de Gaulle for the leadership of the Free French movement), hit back in his two-volume work De Gaulle et les communistes, published in 1988 and 1989, which outlined a conspiracy theory suggesting that de Gaulle had been "manipulated" by the "Soviet agent" Moulin into following the PCF's line of "national insurrection" and thereby eclipsed his grandfather, who, he maintained, should have been the rightful leader of Free France. Taking up Giraud's theories, the lawyer Charles Benfredj argued in his 1990 book L'Affaire Jean Moulin: Le contre-enquête that Moulin was a Soviet agent who had not been killed by Barbie but allowed by the German government to go to the Soviet Union in 1943, where Moulin supposedly died sometime after the war. Benfredj's book was published with an introduction with Jacques Soustelle, the archaeologist of Mexico and wartime Gaullist whose commitment to Algérie française had made him a bitter enemy of de Gaulle by 1959. The essence of all theories about Moulin, the alleged Soviet agent, was that because de Gaulle had agreed to co-operate with the Communists during the war, all of which was Moulin's work, he had set France on the wrong course and led to him granting Algeria independence in 1962, instead of keeping Algeria in France.

Tribute to Jean Moulin in the Rail station of Metz.

It has also been suggested, principally in Marnham's biography, that Moulin was betrayed by communists. Marnham points the finger specifically at Raymond Aubrac and possibly his wife, Lucie. He alleges that communists at times betrayed non-communists to the Gestapo and that Aubrac was linked to harsh actions during the purge of collaborators after the war. In 1990, Barbie, by then "a bitter dying Nazi", named Aubrac as the traitor. To counteract the accusations levelled at Moulin, Daniel Cordier, his personal secretary during the war, wrote a biography of his former leader. In April 1997, Vergès produced a "Barbie Testament", which he claimed that Barbie had given him ten years earlier and purported to show the Aubracs had tipped off Barbie. It was timed for the publication of the book Aubrac Lyon 1943 by Gérard Chauvy, who meant to prove that the Aubracs were the ones who informed Barbie about the fateful meeting at Caluire on 21 June 1943. On 2 April 1998, following a civil suit launched by the Aubracs, a Paris court fined Chauvy and his publisher, Albin Michel, for "public defamation". In 1998, the French historian Jacques Baynac, in his book Les Secrets de l'affaire Jean Moulin, claimed that Moulin was planning to break with de Gaulle to recognise General Giraud, which led the Gaullists to tip off Barbie before that could happen.

== Legacy ==
A famous photograph of Jean Moulin with a scarf and fedora, taken in 1940 by Marcel Bernard

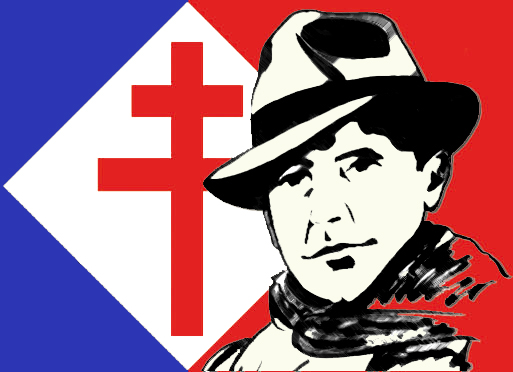
Drawing of Jean Moulin based on the iconic photograph with a fedora and scarf and a cross of Lorraine in the background

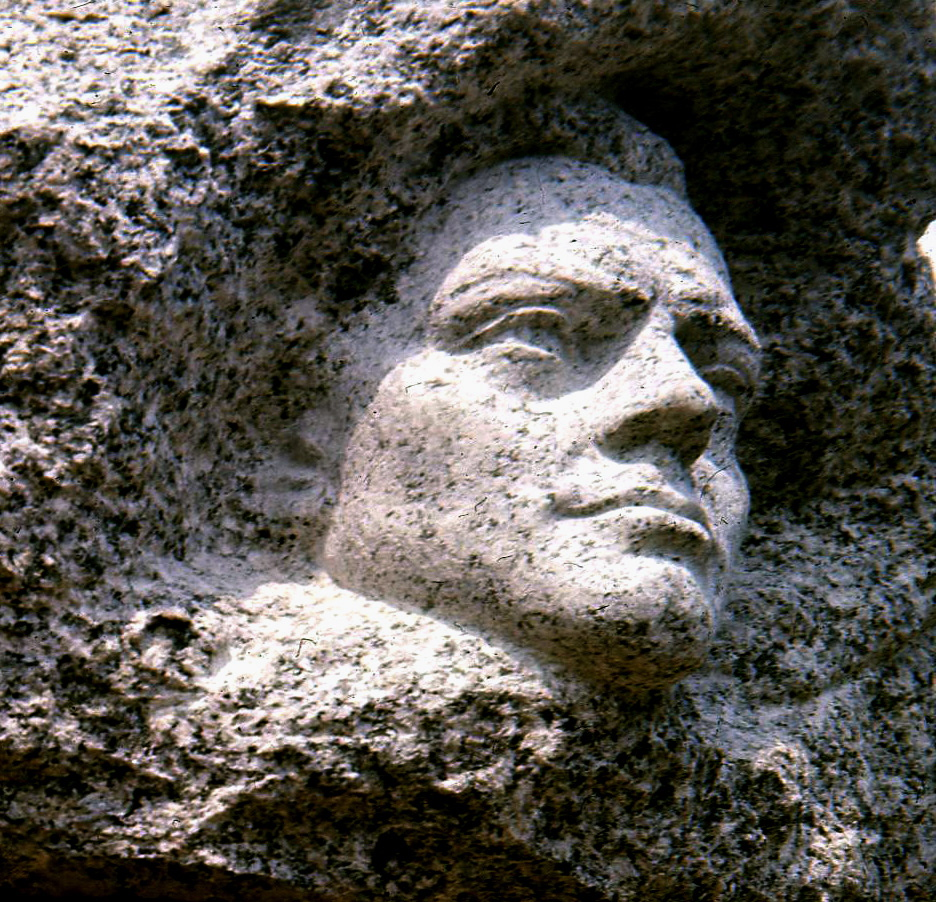
Monument to Jean Moulin at Aix-les-Bains

Ashes that are thought to be those of Jean Moulin were buried in Le Père Lachaise Cemetery in Paris and later transferred to the Panthéon on 19 December 1964. The speech given at the transfer site by André Malraux, a writer and cabinet minister, is one of the most famous speeches in French history.

France's French education curriculum commemorates Moulin as a symbol of the French resistance and a model of civic virtue, moral rectitude and patriotism. As of 2015, Jean Moulin was the fifth most popular name for a French school, and as of 2016 his is the third most popular French street name. Lyon 3 university and a Paris tramway station have also been named after him.

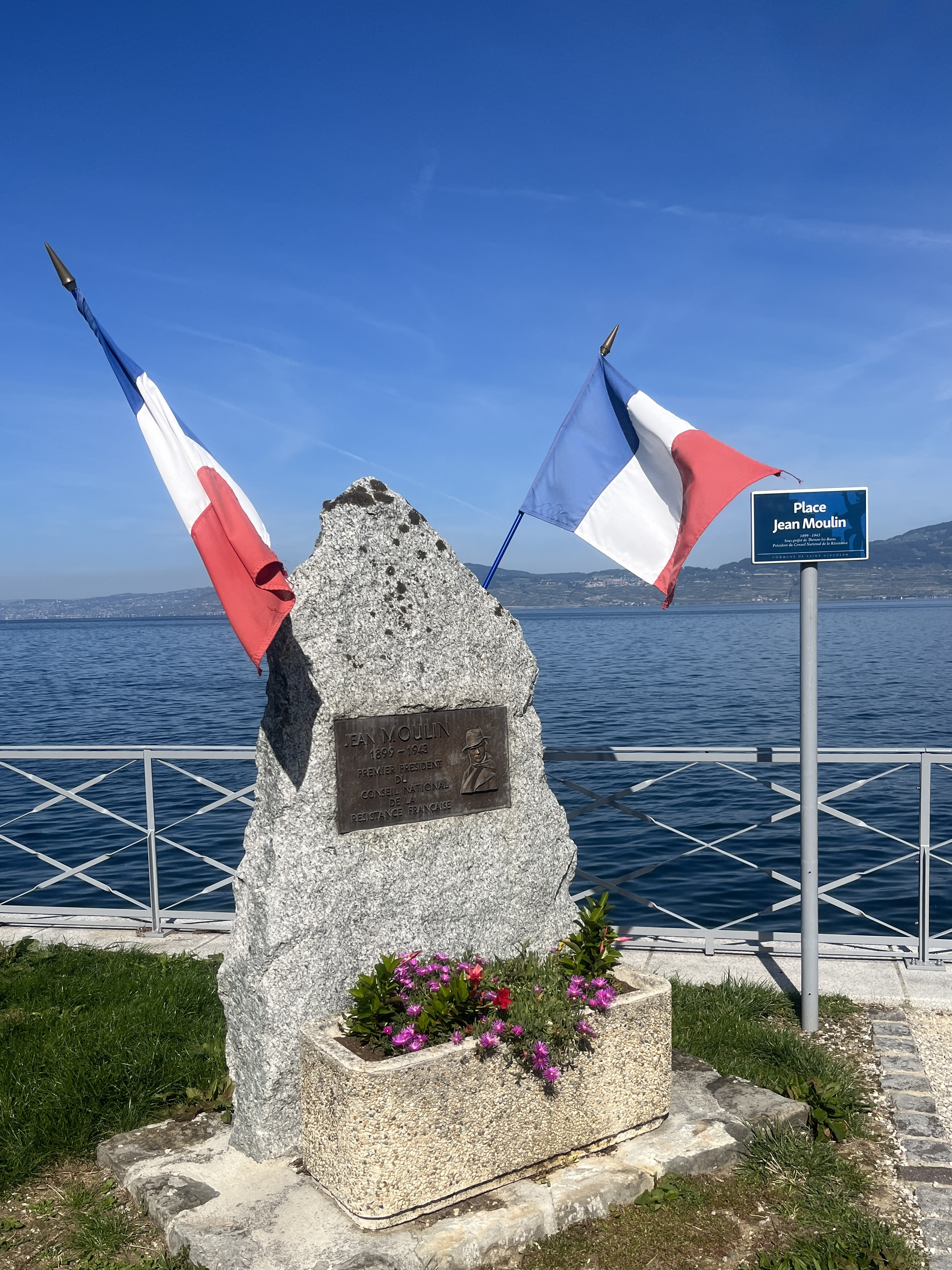
Jean Moulin memorial in Saint-Gingolph

The photograph with a fedora and scarf has become a popular representation of Jean Moulin and more generally the Resistance movement; in it, Jean Moulin seems to hide from onlookers to protect his clandestine life. However, the photograph itself was taken in Montpellier in February 1940 during a family visit, before his first arrest in June 1940 and subsequent decision to join the Resistance.

In 1967, the Centre national Jean-Moulin de Bordeaux was created in Bordeaux. Its archives contain documents on the Second World War and the Resistance. The Centre provides pedagogical supports and research material on the involvement of Jean Moulin in the Resistance. Another member of the resistance, Antoinette Sasse, created a bequest in her will to found The Musée Jean Moulin in 1994.

The 1969 Jean Pierre Melville fictional film Army of Shadows, based on a book of the same name, depicts, through the character of Luc Jardie, played by Paul Meurisse, several events in Moulin's war experience but with some inaccuracy; in the film, his homosexual male secretary is replaced by a female assistant. Two French made-for-television films deal with Jean Moulin: in 2002, Jean Moulin, directed by Yves Boisset and starring Charles Berling and, in 2003, Jean Moulin, une affaire française, directed by Pierre Aknine and starring Francis Huster. Moulin is also a supporting character in the 1997 film Lucie Aubrac, directed by Claude Berri, where he is portrayed by Patrice Chéreau.

In 1981, the newly elected President François Mitterrand placed a rose at Moulin's tomb in the Panthéon on the day of his inauguration ceremony.

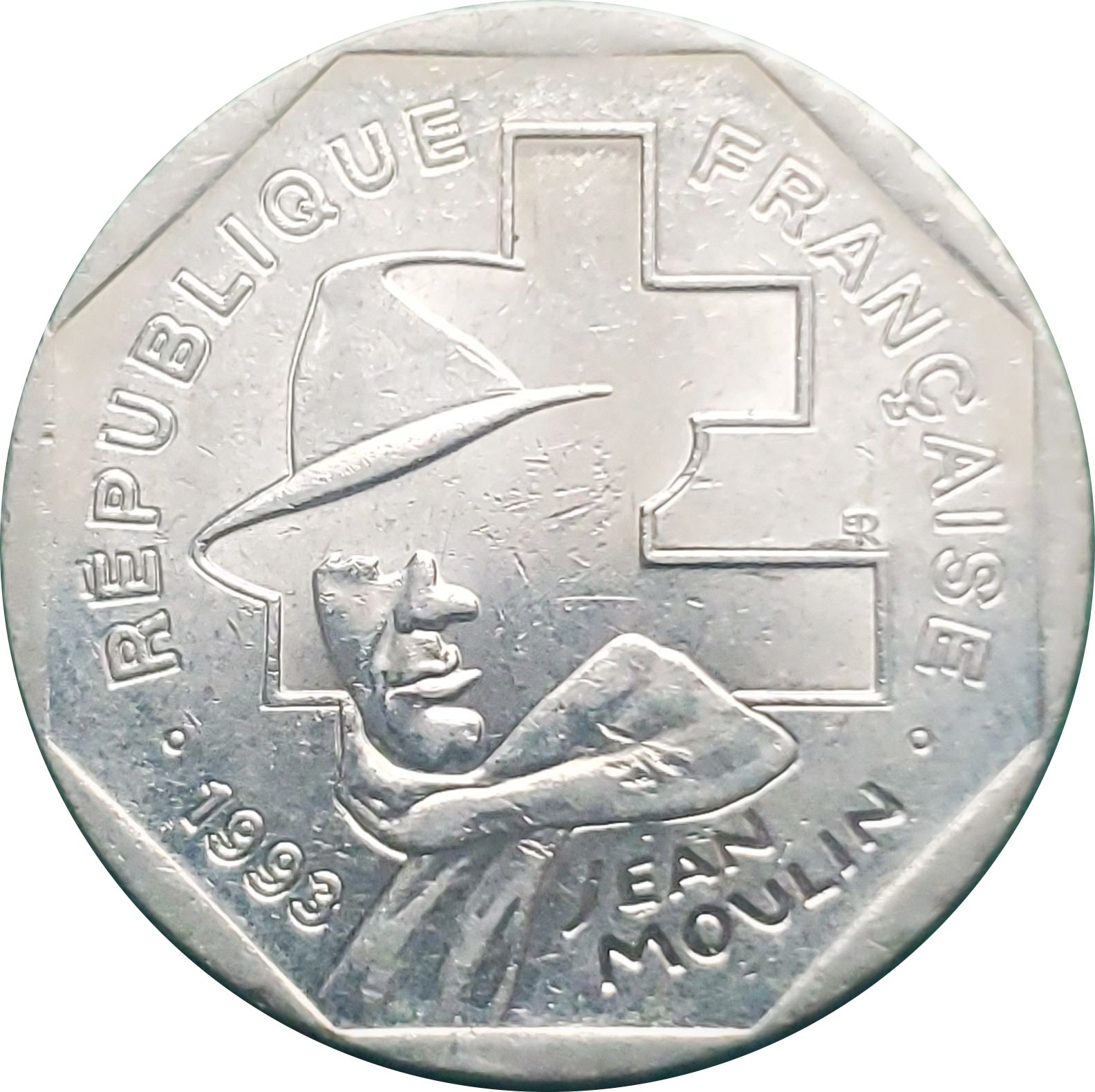
Commemorative 2 franc coin

In 1993, commemorative French 2, 100 and 500 franc coins were issued, showing a partial image of Moulin against the Croix de Lorraine and using a fedora-and-scarf photograph, which is well recognised in France.

== In popular culture ==
Moulin is the subject of an eponymous 2026 feature film directed by László Nemes.

Jean Moulin is featured in GS Carberry's novel In the Shadow of Monsters, set in WW2 and about the fictional character Niki Frolov and the French Resistance."

== Honors and awards ==
- Officer of the Order of Legion of Honour (1945)
- Companions of Liberation (1942)
- Médaille Militaire (1946)
- Croix de guerre 1939-1945
- Knight of the Order of Agricultural Merit (1945)
- Commemorative medal for voluntary service in Free France
- 1914–1918 Inter-Allied Victory medal
- 1914–1918 Commemorative war medal
- Order of the Yugoslav Crown
- Order of Brilliant Jade

== See also ==
- Hôtel Terminus
- Lionel Floch
