= Raymond Aubrac =

Member of the French Resistance in World War II (1914–2012)

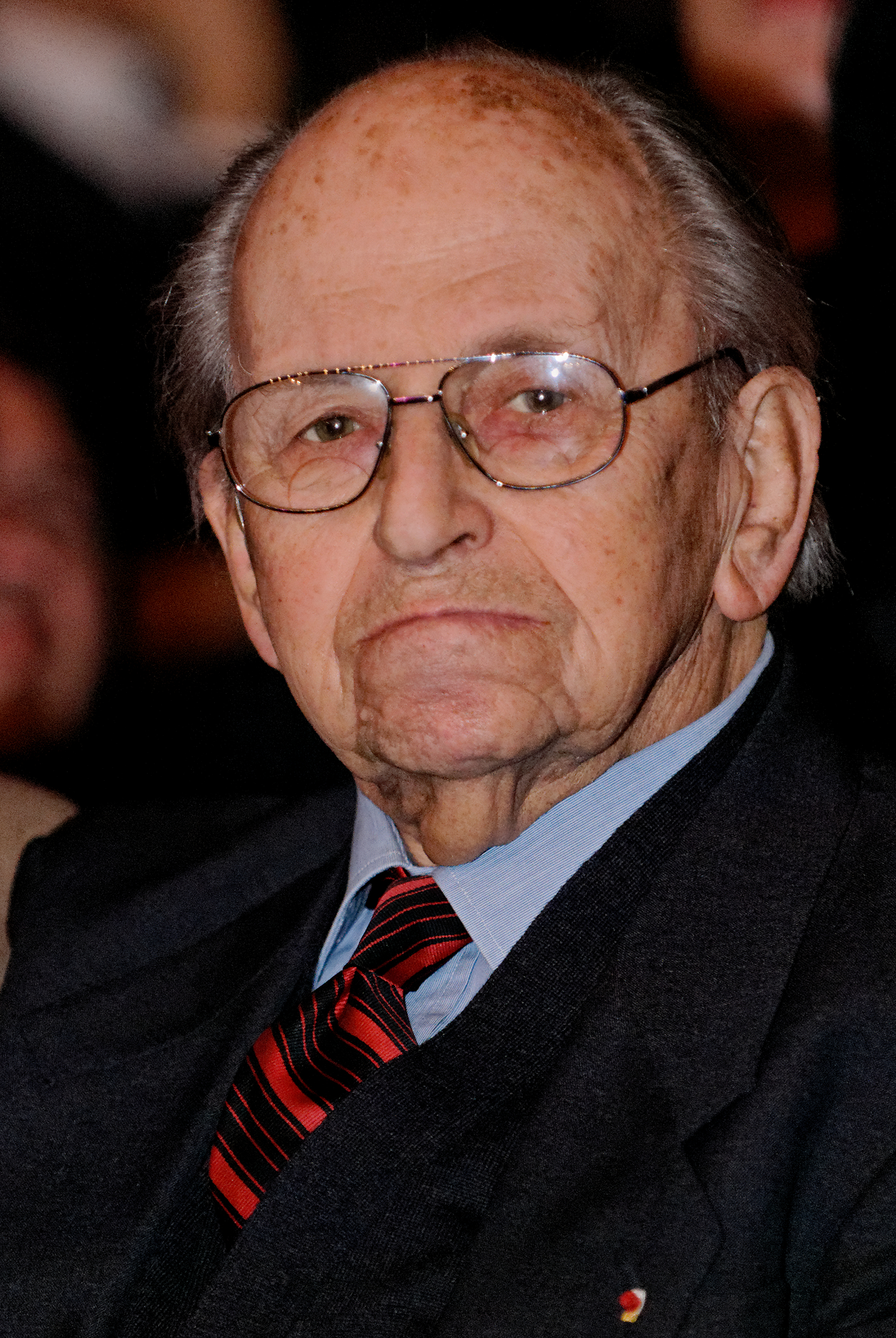
- Aubrac in 2008
- Born: Raymond Samuel; 31 July 1914; Vesoul, France
- Died: 10 April 2012 (aged 97); Paris, France
- Resting place: Salornay-sur-Guye
- Education: Lycée Saint-Louis; École nationale des ponts et chaussées Harvard University; Massachusetts Institute of Technology
- Occupations: French Resistance leader, member of the Provisional Consultative Assembly in Algiers, commissioner in Marseille (1944–1945), co-founder of the Mouvement de la Paix, civil engineer
- Spouse: Lucie Bernard (m. 1939; died 2007)
- Children: 3 (son Jean-Pierre, daughters Catherine and Élisabeth)
- Awards: Grand Cross of the Legion of Honour

Raymond Aubrac (French pronunciation: [ʁɛmɔ̃ obʁak]; born Samuel, 31 July 1914 – 10 April 2012) was a member of the French Resistance in World War II. A civil engineer by trade, he assisted General Charles Delestraint within the Armée secrète. Aubrac and his wife Lucie, both communist Resistance members, were friends with Ho Chi Minh; US Secretary of State Henry Kissinger solicited his help amid the Vietnam War to establish contact with North Vietnam.

== Early life ==
Aubrac was born Raymond Samuel into a middle-class Jewish family in Vesoul, Haute-Saône. His father, Albert Samuel, was born on 2 March 1884 in Vesoul, and his mother, Hélène Falk, was born on 2 March 1894 in Crest. His parents were shop owners. In 1939, he married Lucie Aubrac.

== Graduate studies in Paris and the United States ==
After the baccalauréat, he became an intern in Paris at the Lycée Saint-Louis, and entered the École des ponts ParisTech in 1934, from which he graduated in 1937 in the same promotion as the Laotian prince Souphanouvong, future figurehead of the communist left wing of his country and one of the founders of Pathet Lao, then the first president of the People's Democratic Republic of Laos.

Like the majority of high school students, he followed the "PMS" (higher military preparation) and became an officer during his military service. Previously, as a recipient of an American Field Service scholarship, he left for the United States in August 1937 to study at Massachusetts Institute of Technology (MIT) and Harvard University where he had the opportunity to follow the courses of Joseph Schumpeter.

== Second World War ==
Samuel was serving in the French army as an engineering officer on the Maginot Line at the outbreak of the Second World War. Samuel was taken prisoner by the German army on 21 June 1940, but he managed to escape from the internment camp with the aid of his wife. He and Lucie joined the French Resistance in 1940. He also became an attaché to the staff of the French Army. He adopted several noms de guerre, among them "Vallet, Ermelin, Balmont and Aubrac". Their Resistance activities started off with buying boxes of chalk and writing graffiti on walls. They then moved on to writing tracts and putting them into people's letterboxes. In the autumn of 1940, they also formed one of the first underground Resistance groups—Libération-Sud—in Lyon. In May 1941, after the birth of their first child Jean-Pierre, they helped Emmanuel d'Astier de La Vigerie to set up an underground newspaper called Libération to promote the French Resistance. Raymond Aubrac was arrested by the Milice on 15 March 1943 in a routine raid. He was operating with fake identity papers under the pseudonym François Vallet. His captors had no idea whom they had captured. He was eventually released two months later.

On 21 June 1943, Aubrac was one of eight senior Resistance leaders, including Jean Moulin, secretly meeting in a doctor's surgery in the Lyon suburb of Caluire when Gestapo officers, under the orders of Klaus Barbie, stormed the place and arrested all the eight leaders. The Caluire meeting was held to select a replacement for Charles Delestraint as the commander of the Armée secrète. Delestraint had been arrested twelve days earlier by the Gestapo in Paris on 9 June. Aubrac was arrested under the pseudonym Claude Ermelin. Taken to Montluc prison in Lyon, the eight leaders were interrogated and tortured under the direction of Barbie. Aubrac was sentenced to death by a Paris court, but the execution was not quickly carried out because the authorities still hoped to obtain intelligence from him. Lucie Aubrac helped to organise his escape from the prison. She claimed to be his fiancée, saying he was named "Ermelin" (one of his aliases) and that he had been caught in the raid while innocently visiting a doctor. She was told that he was to be executed for resistance, and asked to marry him; a French legal clause allowed engaged people to marry if one of them was soon to die. Later, when he was being brought back to prison after the supposed marriage, he and fifteen other prisoners were rescued by résistants in cars, led by Lucie, who attacked the vehicle he was in.

He and Lucie later joined Charles de Gaulle's government in exile.

The Aubracs' wartime exploits made interesting movie material. Two French films, Claude Berri's Lucie Aubrac (1997) and Boulevard des hirondelles (1992), have immortalized the Aubracs in the nation's collective memory.

Raymond Aubrac's parents, whom he had tried unsuccessfully to convince to leave for Switzerland, were arrested in France, deported to Auschwitz Concentration Camp by convoy No. 66 on 20 January 1944 and died there.

In August 1944, Charles de Gaulle appointed Aubrac to the post of commissaire de la république in Marseille. The mission of these commissaires was to establish some form of provisional authority in the areas of France just liberated from the Germans. Aubrac organised the purge of the police forces and oversaw the often brutal treatment meted out to suspected collaborators with the Nazis. He requisitioned a number of local industries, leading to allegations that he was really working in the interests of the Communists. Aubrac was dismissed from his post and recalled to Paris after only four months.

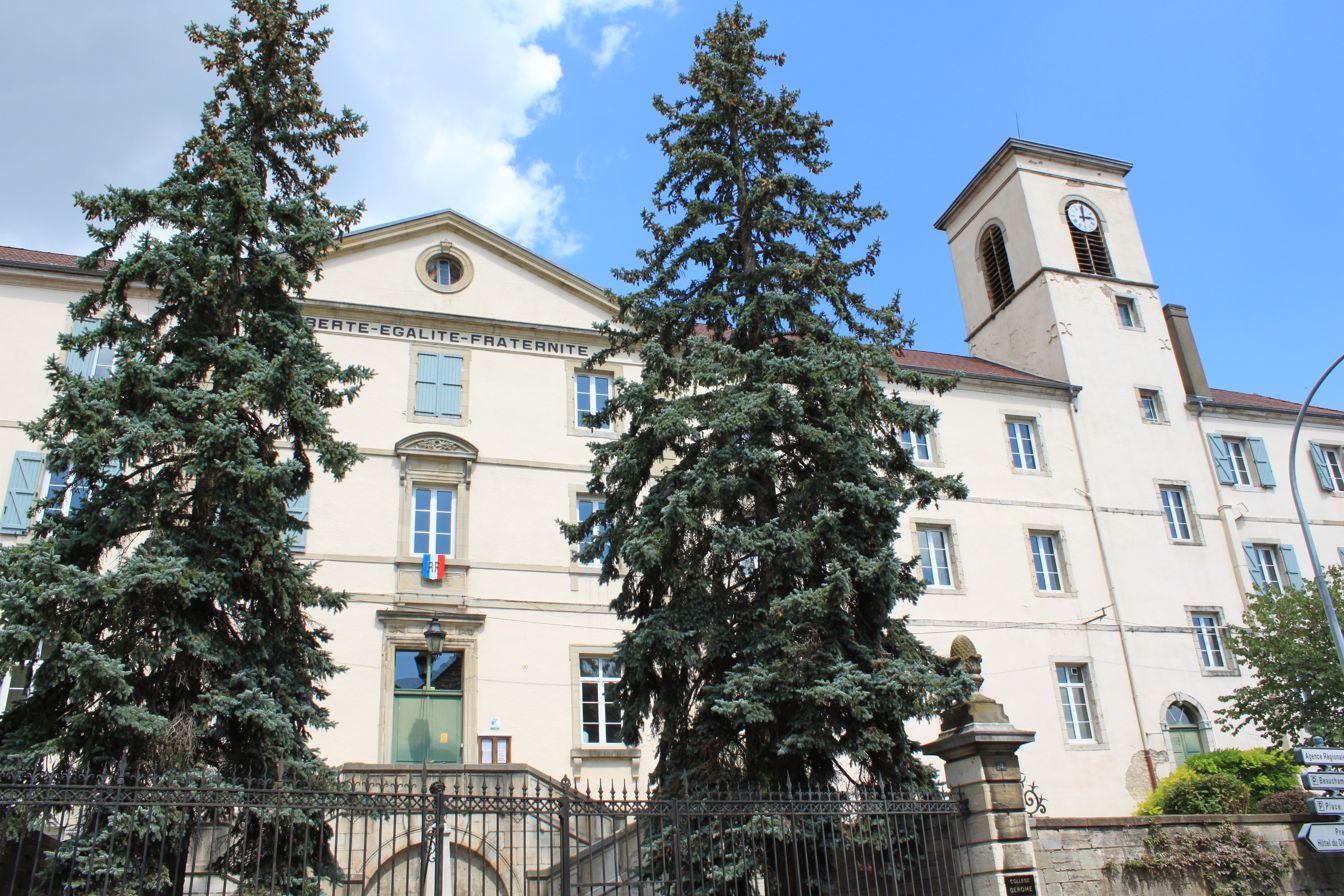
The Gérôme de Vesoul high school, where Raymond Aubrac began his studies.

== Postwar ==
After the end of the Second World War, Aubrac was appointed to a senior post by the Ministry of Reconstruction from 1945 to 1948, during which he oversaw reconstruction and mine clearance.

Lucie Aubrac had been appointed to sit in the Provisional Consultative Assembly as representative of Liberation-Sud. Her childbirth forced her to stay in London, but Emmanuel d'Astier, who had been in Algiers since November 1943, where he was appointed commissioner of the interior of the French Committee of National Liberation (CFLN) asked Raymond to go and join him there. Therefore it was Raymonde who sat in the assembly where, according to his own words, he was bored.

In 1947 and 1950, he was a witness for the prosecution during two trials of fellow French Resistance leader René Hardy, who was accused of betraying Jean Moulin to the Gestapo but eventually acquitted. Although Aubrac and Hardy had both been detained and released prior to the Caluire meeting (supposedly creating an opportunity for the Germans to "turn" them), arrested at the Caluire raid, and subsequently escaped Gestapo custody, Aubrac alleged that in Hardy's case, his escape was too easy and claimed that when Hardy made a run for it, "from all the Germans with their sub-machine guns, there were only a couple of scattered shots."

Aubrac's relations with Charles de Gaulle were sometimes tense because of his Communist leanings. When Ho Chi Minh came to France to negotiate Vietnam's independence in 1946, he decided to stay in the Aubracs' home for several months and he and Raymond Aubrac became friends. Aubrac's Communist sympathies made him a controversial figure with the French right. With Madeleine Ruffaud, a friend from the Resistance who reported for L'Humanité from Hanoi, he supported the Vietnamese resistance to the reimposition of French colonial rule in the 1950s.

In 1948, Aubrac founded an institute, Bureau d'études et de recherches pour l'industrie moderne (BERIM) (the Study and Research Group for Modern Industry), to encourage trade with Communist countries in the Eastern Bloc. He headed the institute for ten years.

He also served in a series of international roles. He was a Director of the United Nations' Rome-based Food and Agriculture Organization (FAO) from 1964 to 1975. In 1978, he joined UNESCO, the United Nations Educational, Scientific and Cultural Organization cultural agency, to work on cooperation projects.

Aubrac worked on many civil engineering projects in Europe, North Africa and Asia. In 1948, he helped to create a civil engineering consultancy firm, at first working mainly with Communist-run local authorities, then in Eastern Europe. It established close links with Eastern Europe, which later led to allegations that it was really a front to raise funds for the Communists.

He served as a technical adviser to the government of Morocco, which has just attained independence from France, from 1958 to 1963.

Aubrac was to be used in the late 1960s by Henry Kissinger, as a secret intermediary between the Americans and the North Vietnamese at the height of the Vietnam War. In the early 1970s, as America tried to negotiate an end to the Vietnam War, Aubrac served as a mediator between the American and North Vietnamese governments. He also joined a group of intellectuals and scientists working to end the war.

In 1973, he worked with the United Nations Secretary-General, Kurt Waldheim, on the followup to the signing of the Paris Peace Accords in January 1973 to end the Vietnam War. In 1975, he was employed by Kurt Waldheim to communicate with the North Vietnamese and Viet Cong in the last few months of the war. In 1975, while working on rebuilding projects in Vietnam, Aubrac witnessed the Fall of Saigon.

In 1985, Aubrac sat on the "Jury of Honor" that was to decide whatever the documentary Des terroristes à la retraite should be aired or not. Aubrac helped write the report of the "Jury of Honor" that concluded: "though it is highly desirable that a film inform French of all generations about the saga of the FTP-MOI, such a film nevertheless still remains to be made”.

Shortly before his death in 1990, Klaus Barbie issued a statement saying it was Raymond Aubrac who had betrayed the secret of Jean Moulin's 1943 Caluire meeting with the Resistance leaders. The same allegations were then insinuated in a book (Aubrac, Lyon 1943; first published by Albin Michel in 1997) written by a French journalist and historian, Gérard Chauvy. In 1997, the Aubracs, feeling outraged by such allegations and attempting to clear their names, submitted themselves to a “jury” of French historians set up by the Libération newspaper. Their report dismissed the notion that the Aubracs were collaborators but noted inconsistencies. In his book Resistance and Betrayal: The Death and Life of the Greatest Hero of the French Resistance (2002), Patrick Marnham suggested that since Aubrac's overriding allegiance was to communism, he would not have considered himself a traitor if he had indeed betrayed Moulin, claiming that French Communists such as the Aubracs at times gave non-Communists such as Moulin to the Gestapo.

In 1994, Aubrac persuaded Madeleine Ruffaud, who had also survived torture and interrogation by the Germans, to break her silence and speak publicly of her experience of the Resistance. In 1996, Aubrac published his own autobiography Où la mémoire s'attarde ("Where the memory lingers").

In his later life, Aubrac made frequent visits to schools to educate the younger generation about the dangers of totalitarianism. He also sought to promote remembrance of the Resistance.

Aubrac endorsed the Socialist Party's François Hollande for France's 2012 two-round presidential election, starting on 22 April. Hollande said that he had met with Aubrac about three weeks before his death and Aubrac told him that he would be closely monitoring the election.

== Family ==
Aubrac was survived by his three children. Ho Chi Minh, a friend of Raymond Aubrac, became the godfather of the Aubracs' third child, daughter Elizabeth.

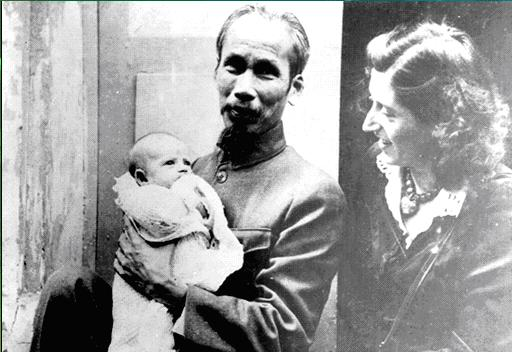
Raymond's daughter, Élisabeth Aubrac, and his wife Lucie Aubrac with Ho Chi Minh, 1946

== Awards ==
- Grand-croix de la Légion d'honneur
- Croix de guerre 1939–1945
- Médaille de la Résistance avec rosette
- Chevalier du Mérite social
- Officier de l'Ordre Ouissam alaouite
- Ordre de l'Amitié de la République socialiste du Viêt Nam

== Death, tributes and funeral ==
Aubrac died on 10 April 2012, aged 97, in the Val-de-Grâce military hospital in Paris, surrounded by his family. He had been hospitalized in recent days after suffering from fatigue. Lucie Aubrac died in 2007 at the age of 94. At the time of his death, he was the sole survivor of the group of eight Resistance leaders arrested in Caluire in June 1943.

President Nicolas Sarkozy, in a statement, said that Aubrac's 1943 escape from the Nazis had "become a legend in the history of the Resistance" and praised him and all Resistance members as "heroes of the shadows who saved France's honor, at a time when it seemed lost." Serge Klarsfeld, the president of the Sons and Daughters of Jewish Deportees from France, hailed Aubrac as the "last great actor and last great witness" of the French Resistance. " They (Raymond and Lucie Aubrac) were a legendary couple," Klarsfeld told BFM-TV. "They were exceptional people." François Hollande said in a statement, “In our darkest times, he was, with Lucie Aubrac, among the righteous, who found, in themselves and in the universal values of our Republic, the strength to resist Nazi barbarism.“

Aubrac was accorded a state funeral will full military honors. It was held on Monday, 16 April 2012, starting at 10am local time, in the main courtyard of the Hôtel national des Invalides in Paris. His flag-draped coffin was borne by ten members of the Republican Guard. President Nicolas Sarkozy presided over the ceremony. Three cabinet ministers—Gérard Longuet, Claude Guéant and Michel Mercier—also represented the government during the ceremony. Aubrac's three children, ten grandchildren, great-grandchildren, as well as several notable French politicians such as François Hollande, François Bayrou, Eva Joly and Bertrand Delanoë were also present. Jean-Louis Crémieux-Brilhac (a member of the Free French Forces and France Libre based in London) and Jacques Vistel (president of the Fondation de la Résistance) delivered eulogies during the ceremony. Aubrac had said he wanted only ex-Resistance fighters to speak at his funeral. "Lucie and Raymond Aubrac have become a reference for all of those who identified with the legacy of the resistance," Crémieux-Brilhac, a 95-year-old ex-member of the Resistance, said in his eulogy. "Lucie and Raymond, from now on a mythic couple, continue to carry the torch of justice and hope," he added. Vistel hailed Raymond Aubrac for "committing himself to make France more just and the world more humane". "He is a monument to the part of our contemporary history (World War II) which is fading from our memories and that only strengthens the duty to remember it," said Nicolas Sarkozy at the end of the 35-minute ceremony outside the main courtyard. As Aubrac's flag-draped coffin was carried away from the courtyard, a French Army choir sang a cappella the French Resistance anthem "Le Chant des Partisans".

Aubrac was later cremated on the same day with only family members present. His ashes were put beside those of Lucie Aubrac in the family tomb of the cemetery in the Burgundian village of Salornay-sur-Guye.

== Books and articles ==
- Bowles, Brett (2011). "Historiography, Memory, and the Politics of Form in Mosco Boucault's Terrorists in Retirement". In Sandra Ott (ed.). War, Exile, Justice, and Everyday Life, 1936–1946. Reno: University of Nevada. pp. 191–224. ISBN 978-1-935709-09-1.
