= René Hardy =

French resistance member (1911–1987)

- Born: 11 October 1911; Mortrée
- Died: 4 December 1987 (aged 76); Melle
- Known for: Resistance fighter

René Hardy (31 October 1911 – 12 April 1987) was a member of the French Resistance during World War II. Hardy was born in Mortrée, Orne. In spite of having rendered dedicated and valuable service as a member of the resistance group, Combat (French Resistance), he was still suspected of being instrumental in the arrest of Jean Moulin, General Charles Delestraint and other members of the resistance. He was acquitted in two separate trials, but suspicions about his role persisted.

== Treason ==
In January 1943 Hardy was seduced by the 20-year-old Lydie Bastien, described by one journalist as a great "French beauty" whose true loyalty was to her German lover, Gestapo officer Harry Stengritt. Hardy was arrested on 7 June 1943 when he walked into a trap laid by Bastien. Bastien, a devotee of the occult and the philosophy of Friedrich Nietzsche, had taken Stengritt as her lover and was paid for her work for the Gestapo in the form of gems that Stengritt had confiscated from French Jews before deporting them to Auschwitz. In turn, Stengritt worked for Klaus Barbie, the "Butcher of Lyon". Bastien recalled: "I was already working for the Germans and they told me how to find and get to know Hardy, whom I met and seduced at their request". Hardy fell madly in love with her, and Bastien later mentioned: "He was soon obsessed with me. Very quickly he was telling me all his secrets and I had complete access to his secret files." Bastien loathed Hardy and slept with him only out of her loyalty to Strengritt and the gems he paid her. On 7 June 1943, Hardy bought a train ticket; as Bastien recalled: "The fool even thought I was coming with him. I warned the Germans he was on his way. Then Barbie called me to Lyon where they had taken Hardy and I told him that he had no choice. He had to collaborate with Barbie, or my parents and myself would be arrested as well."" Faced with the prospect of losing Bastien forever, and unaware of her true loyalties or the fact that she secretly hated him, Hardy agreed to start working for Barbie.

When, in 1943, Gestapo officers under the orders of Klaus Barbie stormed the house in Caluire where the French Resistance leadership was secretly meeting, only Hardy was not put in handcuffs. As the seven other men were led away, Hardy successfully made a break for it. The incident seemed suspicious to Raymond Aubrac, who, based on the ease with which the SS had let him go, always remained convinced that Hardy had alerted the Gestapo of their meeting. "From all the Germans with their submachine guns, there were only a couple of scattered shots," Aubrac later stated.

== After the war ==
After the war, he was tried twice for collaboration for a number of reasons but was found not guilty, despite committing perjury at the first trial. Shortly before his death, he was accused again by Barbie himself, but died before any new charges could be brought.

After his trials, Hardy became a novelist and wrote the book Bitter Victory (French title Amère victoire) which was adapted for the cinema in a Franco-US co-production starring Richard Burton and directed by Nicholas Ray. Shortly before his death, a destitute, broken-down Hardy, dressed in pajamas and apparently living in somebody's attic, was interviewed by film-maker Marcel Ophüls for Hôtel Terminus: The Life and Times of Klaus Barbie. Hardy denied having betrayed Moulin.
