= Charles Delestraint =

French general (1879–1945)

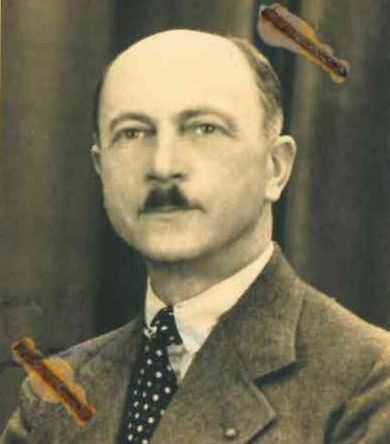
- Photo from French identity card, 1943

Personal details
- Born: 12 March 1879 Biache-Saint-Vaast, France
- Died: 19 April 1945 (aged 66) Dachau, Germany
- Education: École spéciale militaire de Saint-Cyr

Military service
- Allegiance: France
- Branch/service: French Army; Armée secrète
- Rank: Général de corps d'armée
- Commands: 505e régiment de chars de combat 2e division de cavalerie (France); Armée secrète

Charles Delestraint (also called Vidal) (12 March 1879 — 19 April 1945) was a French general, hero of the French Resistance and the first commander of the Armée secrète during World War II. He was a Companion of the Liberation. Delestraint was killed by the Gestapo in 1945.

== Early life ==
Delestraint was born in Biache-Saint-Vaast, Pas-de-Calais, France. He entered the École spéciale militaire de Saint-Cyr in 1897 and later joined the 16th Battalion of the chausseurs à pied in the French Armée de terre (France).

== Military career ==
=== World War I ===
Delestraint achieved the rank of Captain in 1913 and entered the École de guerre in March 1914. In July he took command of the 9th Company of the 58th Battalion of chasseurs à pied, Reserve Unit. At Haybes in the Ardennes, the 9th Company prevented a group of German soldiers crossing the Meuse from infiltrating the French lines. Delestraint and others of the 9th Company were taken prisoner on August 30, 1914 during the attack on Chesnois-Auboncourt. Delestraint was not released until November 1918.

=== Interwar Period ===
After the war he remained in the army where he was a proponent for the use of armoured forces. Regularly promoted from 1918 to 1936 to the rank of colonel, he commanded the 3rd Tank Brigade at Quartier Lizé in Montigny-lès-Metz and counted Lieutenant-Colonel Charles de Gaulle (then Colonel de Gaulle commanding the 507th Tank Regiment) among his subordinates. Both men inherited from General Jean-Baptiste Eugène Estienne the same innovative vision of the use of armored vehicles in modern strategy. In 1936, Delestraint made brigadier general (général de brigade). In March 1939, he was transferred to the reserve.

=== World War II ===
General Delestraint was recalled to active duty on 1 September 1939 during the French general mobilisation at the start of World War II. He commanded, then as a divisional general raised to the dignity of corps general (in May 1940), the combat tanks of the 7th Army and then, from 2 June 1940, the 1st armoured group, which coordinated the attacks on the Abbeville pocket and then covered the withdrawal of the two armies during the Battle of France.

==== In the Resistance ====
Throughout the retreat, after having fought as far as Valençay, General Delestraint refused defeat and the armistice. He was demobilized and retired to Bourg-en-Bresse.

Henri Frenay recruited him into the French Resistance. Delestraint began to organize resistance in Lyon.

In August 1942, after advice from Henri Frenay, and on the proposal of Jean Moulin, General de Gaulle chose him to organize and command the Armée sécrète, which was to bring together different Resistance movements in the southern zone: Combat, Libération-Sud and Franc-Tireur. Delestraint accepted the orders of his former subordinate, took the pseudonym "Vidal" and worked in coordination with Jean Moulin to expand the structure to the northern zone. During this period, he had François-Yves Guillin as his secretary, and Joseph Gastaldo as head of the 2nd office of his staff, whose deputy was André Lassagne. Despite the traps set, Vidal would organize, structure, and command the Secret Army until his arrest.

He was arrested by the Gestapo on 9 June 1943 and interrogated by Klaus Barbie. He was taken as special prisoner (Nacht und Nebel) to Natzweiler-Struthof and then to the Dachau concentration camp, where he was executed on 19 April 1945, only a few days before the camp was liberated and the war ended.

== Legacy ==
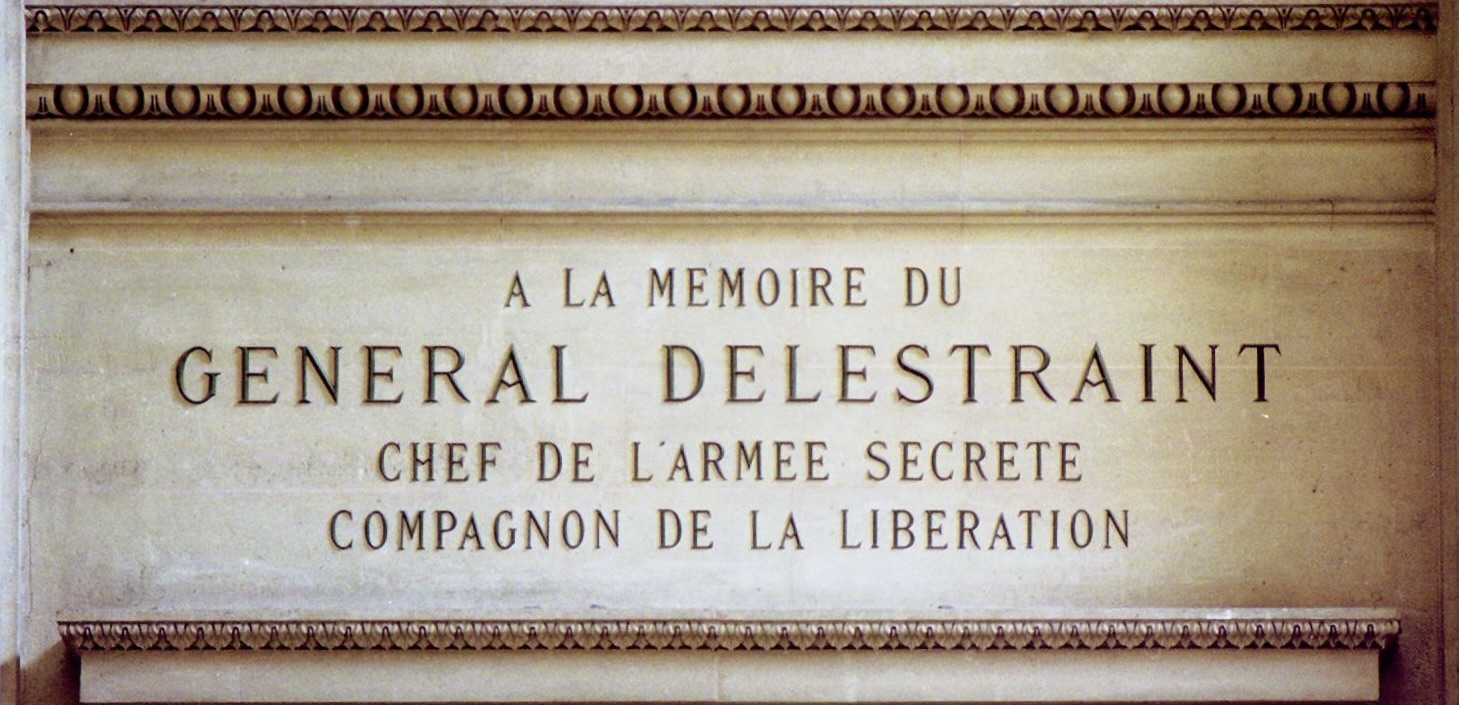
Inscription honoring Charles Delestraint at the Panthéon in Paris

Delestraint was inducted into the Panthéon in 1989.

== Honours ==
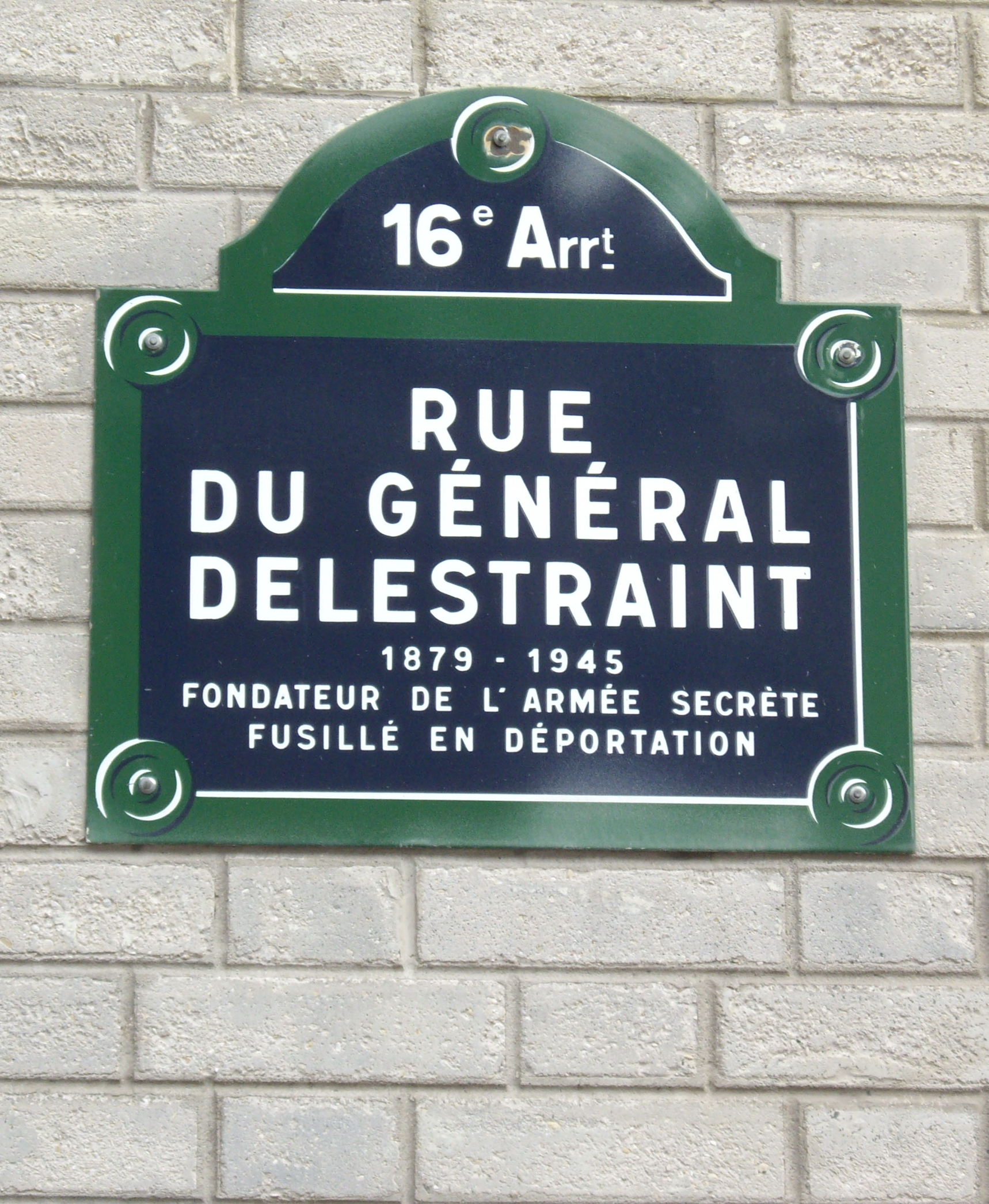
Memorial plaque at the rue du Général-Delestraint, Paris 16e, France

- Commander of the Légion d'honneur
- Companion of the Liberation
- Croix de guerre 1914–1918 with palm
- Croix de guerre 1939–1945
- Croix de Guerre from Belgium
