= André Lassagne =

French politician (1911–1953)

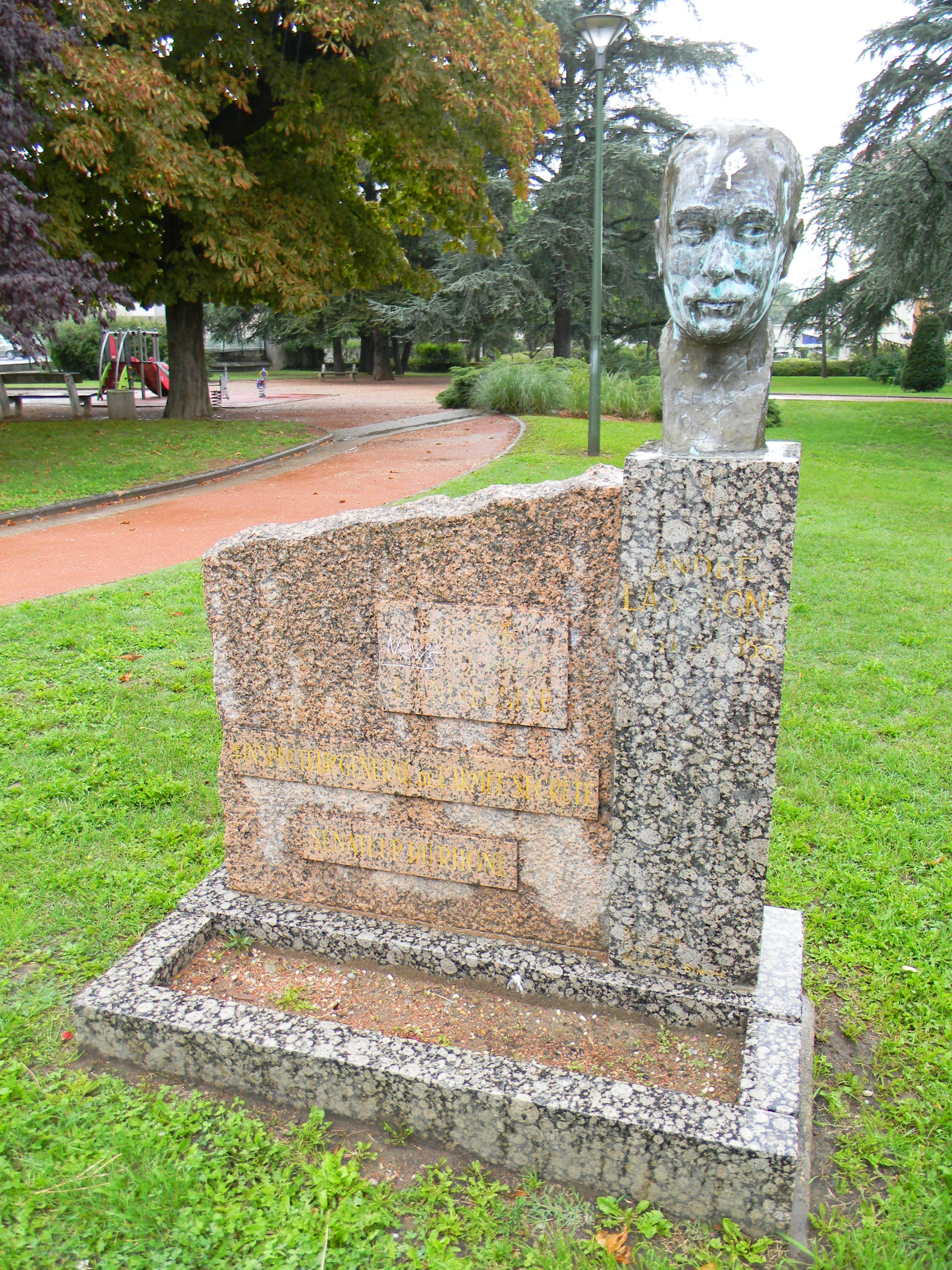
Stele of André Lassagne in a park in Caluire-et-Cuire.

André Lassagne (23 April 1911 – 3 April 1953) was a member of the French Resistance during World War II. The secretary general of "L'Armée Secrète" (AS), he was arrested (along with Jean Moulin) on June 21, 1943, in Caluire-et-Cuire (Rhône). After the war he became Senator for Rhone and was awarded the Legion d'Honneur.

== Before the war ==
=== Childhood ===
Lassagne was born in Lyon, France.

== Recognition ==
- Légion d'honneur
- Quai André Lassagne
- College André Lassagne
- Rue André Lassagne

== Publication ==
Feuillets Clandestins De Fresnes - (8 Juillet 1943-16 Février 1944)
