= Gilles Salles =

French haematologist

- Education: Claude Bernard University Lyon 1
- Title: Chief of the Lymphoma Service
- Scientific career
- Fields: Hematology Lymphoma
- Workplaces: Memorial Sloan Kettering Cancer Center, New York, USA

Gilles Salles is a French haematologist who joined the Memorial Sloan Kettering Cancer Center in New York in 2020 after a career as a French University Professor & Medical Doctor in Lyon University Hospitals (France). He is specialized in hematologic malignancies, in particular non-Hodgkin and Hodgkin lymphomas.

== Education ==
Salles obtained his master DEA degree in Differentiation, Genetics and Immunology from the Claude Bernard University of Lyon in 1986. In 1989 he continued his university studies and graduated as a Doctor of Medicine, in 1992 he obtained an Advanced Specialised Studies Degree in Cancerology. 1994 he defended his PhD thesis in Immunology on signals regulating B lymphocytes formation. He completed his post-doctorate fellowship at the Dana Farber Cancer Institute of the Harvard Medical School of Boston in the United States (1990–92).

== Career ==
Salles was nominated full professor of Medecine at the Claude Bernard University of Lyon in 1996 (Faculté de Médecine et de Maïeutique Lyon-Sud Charles Mérieux), and he chaired the Departement of Hematology of Lyon University Hospital (Hospices Civils de Lyon, Lyon Sud Hospital) from 2011 until his departure to MSKCC.

In1996, he founded is the research team “Indolent B-cell proliferation” in Lyon University, that examined several aspects of lymphoma biology (ontogeny of B- and T-cell lymphoma, biology of splenic marginal zone, prognostic factors in lymphoma). This research team was successfully affiliated with the Laboratoire de Biologie Moléculaire de la Cellule (UMR5239 : ENS-Lyon, CNRS, Hospices Civils de Lyon) and then to the Cancer Research Center of Lyon (INSERM, Université Claude Bernard, Centre Léon Bérard).

His interest in clinical research led him to chair the scientific committee of the "Groupe d'Etude des Lymphomes de l'Adulte" (1996-2007) and then to become the chair of the LYSA cooperative group (the Lymphoma Study Association, a leading cooperative group in lymphoma research). (2012-2020)

Previously, he also held the following positions: vice-president in charge of research at the board of directors of the Hospices Civils de Lyon (2010-2016); head of the steering committee of the CALYM consortium (2011-2020); chair of the Leukaemia Committee of the “Fondation de France” (2005–07) and chair of the scientific programme committee of the European Hematology Association (EHA) for its 13th Congress (2008); member of the editorial board of Journal of Clinical Oncology (2010-2013), of Blood (2014–2018).

Salles is on secondment of his position of professor of medicine (haematology) at Université Lyon-1, (1996) and is the chief of the Lymphoma Service, within the Division of Hematologic Malignancies, Departement of Medecin at Memorial Sloan Kettering Cancer Center. He is also associate editor at the journal Haematologica.

He is also a member of several professional societies, including the American Society of Hematology, the American Society of Clinical Oncology, the European Heamatology Association and the French Society of Hematology. He serves on the Scientific Advisory Board of the Lymphoma Research Foundation.

He was designated as "Chevalier de l'Ordre du Mérite" in 2016 and received the Jose Carreras Award from the European Hematology Association in 2020.

== Research ==
Salles has been especially interested in the clinical and biological study of malignant lymphoma – major focuses of his work include the description and validation of prognostic factors as well as clinical trials in indolent lymphomas. He has been involved as a coordinator or co-investigator in many clinical trials and studies within his field. Gilles Salles has directed or contributed to several International studies leading to the approval of several drugs used for the treatment of lymphoma, including rituximab, obinutuzumab, idelalisib, tisagenlecleucel, tafasitamab, tazemetostat, polatuzumab Bedouin.

Salles is the author of more than 600 international publications.

== Selected publications ==
- Uppal M, Bhinder B, Marderstein AR, Lee Batlevi C, Falchi L, Hamlin P, Horwitz S, Kumar A, Noy A, Zelenetz AD, Lue JK, Torka P, Epstein-Peterson ZD, Arcila M, Dogan A, Imber B, Yahalom J, Vardhana SA, Intlekofer A, Raj S, Shouval R, Hodkinson B, Stokes ME, Kittai AS, Brody JD, Elemento O, Salles G, Joffe E. Integrative Molecular Analysis Reveals Determinants of Clinical Outcomes in TP53-Mutated Diffuse Large B-Cell Lymphoma. J Clin Oncol. 2026 Apr 29:JCO2501928. doi: 10.1200/JCO-25-01928. Epub ahead of print. PMID 42054619.
- Tilly H, Morschhauser F, Sehn LH, Friedberg JW, Trněný M, Sharman JP, Herbaux C, Burke JM, Matasar M, Rai S, Izutsu K, Mehta-Shah N, Oberic L, Chauchet A, Jurczak W, Song Y, Greil R, Mykhalska L, Bergua-Burgués JM, Cheung MC, Pinto A, Shin HJ, Hapgood G, Munhoz E, Abrisqueta P, Gau JP, Hirata J, Jiang Y, Yan M, Lee C, Flowers CR, Salles G. Polatuzumab Vedotin in Previously Untreated Diffuse Large B-Cell Lymphoma. N Engl J Med. 2022 Jan 27;386(4):351-363. doi: 10.1056/NEJMoa2115304. Epub 2021 Dec 14. PMID 34904799; PMCID: PMC11702892.
- Sehn LH, Salles G. Diffuse Large B-Cell Lymphoma. Reply. N Engl J Med. 2021 Jun 10;384(23):2262. doi: 10.1056/NEJMc2105452. PMID 34107189.
- Huet S, Tesson B, Jais JP, Feldman AL, Magnano L, Thomas E, Traverse-Glehen A, Albaud B, Carrère M, Xerri L, Ansell SM, Baseggio L, Reyes C, Tarte K, Boyault S, Haioun C, Link BK, Feugier P, Lopez-Guillermo A, Tilly H, Brice P, Hayette S, Jardin F, Offner F, Sujobert P, Gentien D, Viari A, Campo E, Cerhan JR, Salles G. A gene-expression profiling score for prediction of outcome in patients with follicular lymphoma: a retrospective training and validation analysis in three international cohorts.Lancet Oncol. 2018;19(4):549-561.
- Le Gouill S, Thieblemont C, Oberic L, Moreau A, Bouabdallah K, Dartigeas C, Damaj G, Gastinne T, Ribrag V, Feugier P, Casasnovas O, Zerazhi H, Haioun C, Maisonneuve H, Houot R, Jardin F, Van Den Neste E, Tournilhac O, Le Dû K, Morschhauser F, Cartron G, Fornecker LM, Canioni D, Callanan M, Béné MC, Salles G, Tilly H, Lamy T, Gressin R, Hermine O; LYSA Group. Rituximab after Autologous Stem-Cell Transplantation in Mantle-Cell Lymphoma. N Engl J Med. 2017 Sep 28;377(13):1250-1260.
- Ribrag V, Koscielny S, Bosq J, Leguay T, Casasnovas O, Fornecker LM, Recher C, Ghesquieres H, Morschhauser F, Girault S, Gouill SL, Ojeda-Uribe M, Mariette C, Cornillon J, Cartron G, Verge V, Chassagne-Clément C, Dombret H, Coiffier B, Lamy T, Tilly H, Salles G. Rituximab and dose-dense chemotherapy for adults with Burkitt's lymphoma: a randomised, controlled, open-label, phase 3 trial. Lancet. 2016; 387(10036):2402-11.
- Swerdlow SH, Campo E, Pileri SA, Harris NL, Stein H, Siebert R, Advani R, Ghielmini M, Salles GA, Zelenetz AD, Jaffe ES. The 2016 revision of the World Health Organization (WHO) classification of lymphoid neoplasms. Blood. 2016 19;127(20):2375-90.
- Ghesquieres H, Slager SL, Jardin F, Veron AS, Asmann YW, Maurer MJ, Fest T, Habermann TM, Bene MC, Novak AJ, Mareschal S, Haioun C, Lamy T, Ansell SM, Tilly H, Witzig TE, Weiner GJ, Feldman AL, Dogan A, Cunningham JM, Olswold CL, Molina TJ, Link BK, Milpied N, Cox DG, Salles GA, Cerhan JR. Genome-Wide Association Study of Event-Free Survival in Diffuse Large B-Cell Lymphoma Treated With Immunochemotherapy. J Clin Oncol. 2015 20;33(33):3930-7.
- Gopal AK, Kahl BS, de Vos S, Wagner-Johnston ND, Schuster SJ, Jurczak WJ, Flinn IW, Flowers CR, Martin P, Viardot A, Blum KA, Goy AH, Davies AJ, Zinzani PL, Dreyling M, Johnson D, Miller LL, Holes L, Li D, Dansey RD, Godfrey WR, Salles GA.;PI3Kδ Inhibition by Idelalisib in Patients with Relapsed Indolent Lymphoma. N Engl J Med. 2014 370(11):1008-18 (A)
- Positron emission tomography-computed tomography (PET-CT) after induction therapy is highly predictive of patient outcome in follicular lymphoma: analysis of PET-CT in a subset of PRIMA trial participants.; Trotman J, Fournier M, Lamy T, Seymour JF, Sonet A, Janikova A, Shpilberg O, Gyan E, Tilly H, Estell J, Forsyth C, Decaudin D, Fabiani B, Gabarre J, Salles B, Van Den Neste E, Canioni D, Garin E, Fulham M, Vander Borght T, Salles G.; J Clin Oncol. 2011 Aug 10;29(23):3194-200.
- Prognostic significance of immunohistochemical biomarkers in diffuse large B-cell lymphoma: a study from the Lunenburg Lymphoma Biomarker Consortium.; Salles G, de Jong D, Xie W, Rosenwald A, Chhanabhai M, Gaulard P, Klapper W, Calaminici M, Sander B, Thorns C, Campo E, Molina T, Lee A, Pfreundschuh M, Horning S, Lister A, Sehn LH, Raemaekers J, Hagenbeek A, Gascoyne RD, Weller E.; Blood. 2011 Jun 30;117(26):7070-8.
- Rituximab maintenance for 2 years in patients with high tumour burden follicular lymphoma responding to rituximab plus chemotherapy (PRIMA): a phase 3, randomised controlled trial.; Salles G, Seymour JF, Offner F, López-Guillermo A, Belada D, Xerri L, Feugier P, Bouabdallah R, Catalano JV, Brice P, Caballero D, Haioun C, Pedersen LM, Delmer A, Simpson D, Leppa S, Soubeyran P, Hagenbeek A, Casasnovas O, Intragumtornchai T, Fermé C, da Silva MG, Sebban C, Lister A, Estell JA, Milone G, Sonet A, Mendila M, Coiffier B, Tilly H.; Lancet. 2011 Jan 1;377(9759):42-51.
