= André Vansteenberghe =

Member of the French Resistance

- Born: André Vansteenberghe; April 16, 1906
- Died: November 6, 1984; Marseille
- Occupation: physician
- Organization: French Resistance
- Known for: Leading a local French resistance group.

André Vansteenberghe (16 April 1906 - 6 November 1984) was a general medical practitioner and a leading member of the French Resistance in southern France during World War II.

== Biography ==
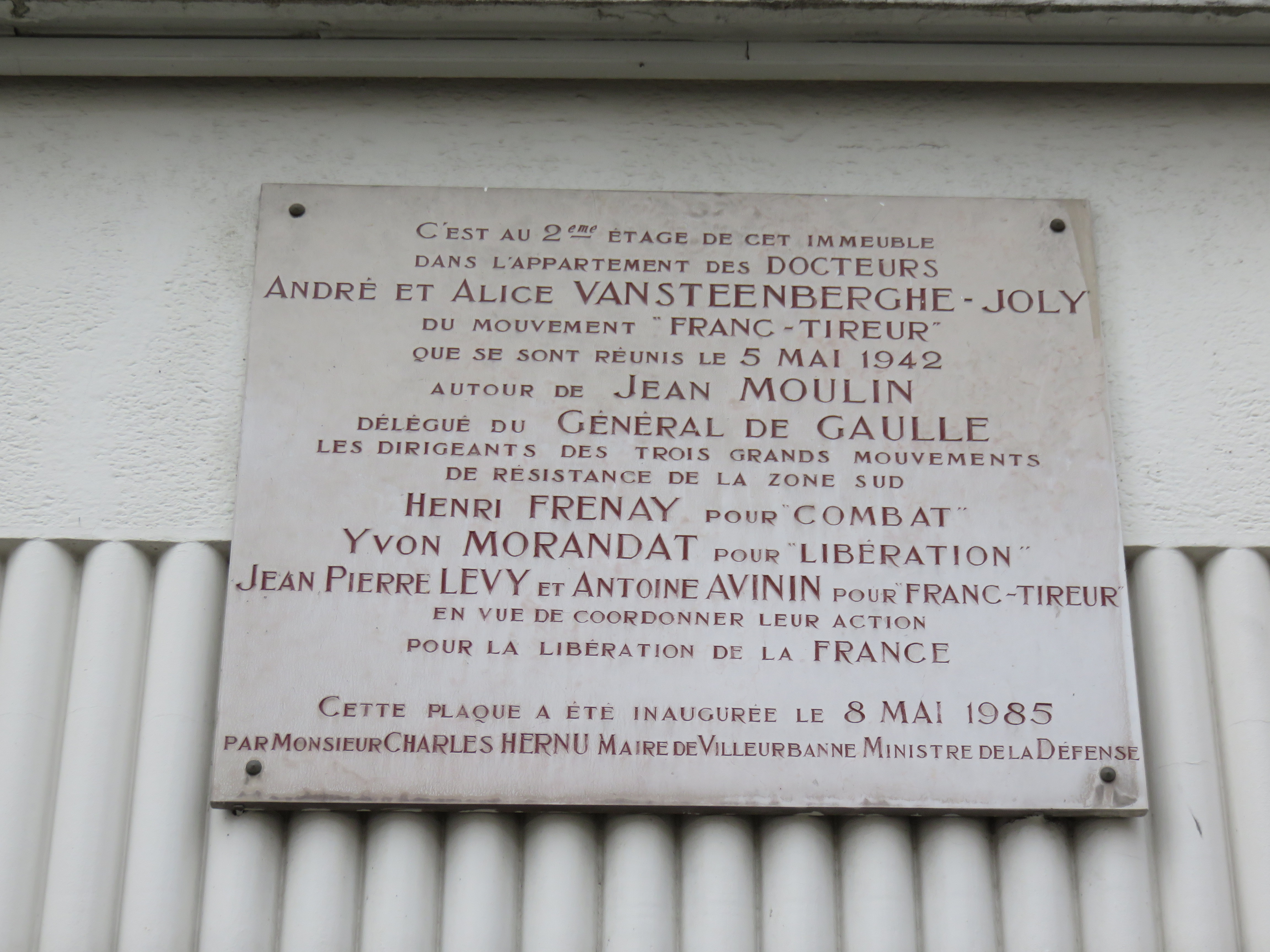
A plaque commemorating historic meetings held by French Resistance leaders at Vansteenberghe's home in Villeurbanne

He was born in Orléans. His father was a clerk in the local tobacco factory. He worked as a medical student in hospitals in Lyon in 1926, followed by a period as an intern in Saint Étienne in 1929, returning to Lyon as an intern that year until he obtained his doctorate from la faculté de médecine de Lyon in November 1932. During his studies he had met Alice Joly - a fellow medical student on his course - and they married at Lyon town hall on 21 October, 1929. In December 1932, they moved into a first-floor flat on 3 avenue Aristide-Briand, Villeurbanne, where they had separate offices in a home-based general practice. He offered free municipal medical care in Villeurbanne and lectured in hygiene at the local university. He and his wife joined the communist party and he became a freemason in the "Tolerance and Cordiality Lodge". From 1938, he worked as a medical inspector for schools before being called up in 1940 as a medical officer in the French 6th Army; his wife replaced him in his inspector role. He returned as a school inspector after being wounded. His communist party membership led to his and his wife's dismissal in July 1941 under a new Vichy regime law.

In July 1940, they joined the French Resistance. Under the guidance of Jean-Pierre Lévy, they produced Le Franc-Tireur, an underground newspaper. Claudius Billon recruited them into the resistance army. They were twice denounced to the medical authorities by the mayor of Villeurbanne for suspected anti-Vichy activities. They exchanged secret messages with London and received materials dropped from British aircraft by parachute; his code-name was "Michel" and his wife's was "Geneviève Prunier". Resistance leaders Henry Frenay, Yvon Morandat, Antoine Avinin and Jean Moulin - the latter sent by Charles de Gaulle in London - visited their home. The Vansteenberghes treated wounded resistance fighters and faked medical proof to help men avoid recruitment as compulsory labour in Germany. In 1943, they joined the Gallia-RPA network. French police raided their home in September and questioned them but they were released. On 24 April 1944, the Gestapo raided it again, looking for Jewish refugees, but Vansteenberghe had been warned by his daughter and stepfather that the Gestapo were drinking in the café below, giving him time to move his weapons and archives from his home to his secretary's. He and his wife hid with the Resistance in Beaujolais before continuing activity from a different flat in Lyon.

Because of Nazi successes against Resistance leaders, Vansteenberghe was promoted to regional head of the RPA network on 4 August 1944 and his wife became the medical chief. She was captured on the street the following day, detained and tortured in Montluc prison under the direction of the local Gestapo chief, Klaus Barbie. She was freed with the other prisoners on 24 August 1944 without having provided any names but disabled for life. Vansteenberghe interrogated Nazi collaborators in the La Part-Dieu barracks and searched premises formerly occupied by the Nazis. He found that their flat had been looted. They continued with their medical practice after the war.

== Awards ==
Vansteenberghe was awarded the Légion d’Honneur and the Médaille de la Résistance.

== Death and legacy ==
Vansteenberghe died on 6 November 1984, in Marseille, survived by his wife and daughter, Georgette. A plaque commemorating the Resistance meetings held at their home in Villeurbanne was inaugurated by the mayor of Villeurbanne in 1985. A park honouring their memory, le parc Alice et André Vansteenberghe, was inaugurated in June 1991.
