= Rabesa Zafera Antoine =

President of the University of Mahajanga

Antoine Zafera Rabesa

President of the University of Mahajanga
- In office 23 April 2010 – 10 October 2014
- Preceded by: Ralison Andrianaivo
- Succeeded by: Interim Committee

Personal details
- Born: 20 May 1950 (age 75) Antsohihy, French Madagascar
- Party: Economic Liberalism and Democratic Action for National Recovery
- Nickname: Danjy

Antoine Zafera Rabesa (born 20 May 1950 in Antsohihy, French Madagascar) is a Malagasy. He was President of the University of Mahajanga from 23 April 2010 until 10 October 2014.

== Academic career ==
=== Studies ===
After his graduation, Antoine obtained four postgraduate qualifications, which enabled his progression among the élite of Madagascar and even French itself:

- Ingéniorat of the Tertiary College (French: École Supérieure) of Tropical Agronomy in Nogent-sur-Marne and Montpellier.
- Doctorate of Science at Claude Bernard University Lyon 1.
- Ph.D. in plant biology at Pierre and Marie Curie University in the Sorbonne, Paris.
- Certificate of Higher Education in Physiology and Applied pharmacology at Claude Bernard University Lyon 1.

=== Career ===
His professional career is based in the world of higher education, being a professor of the University of Mahajanga teaching general studies, ecology, and general research and development in plant biology in the Faculty of Sciences: He is also an advisor to the University's Rector.

He is known in French academic circles, and in 1990 was given the honorary title of the Grand officier of the Ordre national du Mérite of France for his work there and for his contribution to Franco-Malagacian relations. He has made a name for himself in the scientific world by publishing over 34 scientific papers, and has two patents, one for a plant-based anti-asthmatic drug and one for a traditional plant-based Madagascar cosmetic.

== Political career ==
=== Minister ===
From 1983 to 1991, Antoine was Minister of Research and Technology Development under Admiral Didier Ratsiraka.

On 26 May 2011, he was appointed Minister of Higher Education and Scientific Research by the Interim President Andry Rajoelina under the head of government, Albert Camille Vital.

=== Ambassador ===
After a break of a few years he was asked by Admiral Didier Ratsiraka to represent the Malagasy diplomatic mission to West Germany as Ambassador of Madagascar. Until 2009, he combined this with his professorial role at the University of Mahajanga.

== Bianco ==
In May 2023 he was summoned by the BIANCO - Malagasy Anti-corruption agency to appear before it in connection with allegations of corruption related to the awarding of contracts during his tenure. But he preferred not to show up.

=== University President ===
On 23 April 2010, Antoine officially took his position as President of the University of Mahajanga. He wrote a paper detailing ten projects for the development of the university:

1. Creation of an Institute of Applied Biology
2. Creation of an Institute of Languages and Civilisations of the Mascarene Islands
3. Creation of an Institute of Commercial Foreign Languages
4. Creating of a School of Law and Political Science
5. Creation of a School of Business Management
6. Creation of a Higher School of Industrial Science and Technology" and a Vocational School of Rural, Urban and Civil Engineering
7. Creation of a School of Tourism
8. Review the progress of the first year of the CDR (Faculty of Medicine)
9. Review the natural sciences affiliates, and creation of a materials science affiliate
10. Creation of a Technical Centre for the Dissemination of Communication and Information
