= Ulrich Wilhelm Paetzold =

German physicist

Ulrich Wilhelm Paetzold (born October 1, 1982, in Lingen) is a German physicist specializing in photovoltaics and a university professor at the Faculty of Electrical Engineering and Information Technology at the Karlsruhe Institute of Technology (KIT). He heads departments at the Institute for Microstructure Technology and the Light Technology Institute at KIT.

== Academic career and research ==
After completing his secondary education at Gymnasium Nepomucenum Rietberg and completing civil service with the Brazilian NGO AVICRES, Ulrich Wilhelm Paetzold began studying physics at RWTH Aachen University in 2003, graduating in 2009. Alongside his studies at RWTH Aachen and his subsequent doctoral research, Paetzold pursued an interdisciplinary Master of Science in "Industrial Ecology" at Chalmers University of Technology in Gothenburg, Sweden, which he completed in 2011.

From 2009 to 2013, Paetzold was a doctoral candidate at Forschungszentrum Jülich and earned his doctorate at the Faculty of Mathematics, Computer Science, and Natural Sciences at RWTH Aachen University under the supervision of Uwe Rau and Gero von Plessen. His dissertation, titled "Light Trapping with Plasmonic Back Contacts in Thin-Film Silicon Solar Cells", focused on nanophotonic concepts to enhance light absorption in thin-film silicon solar cells.

After an additional year as a postdoctoral researcher at Forschungszentrum Jülich, where he investigated optical fundamentals and nanophotonic light management in solar cells, Paetzold joined imec in Leuven, Belgium, in 2014. Initially supported by a DAAD fellowship, he later worked as a research scientist at the institution.

In 2016, Paetzold received funding for early-career scientists from the Helmholtz Association to establish an independent research group at the Karlsruhe Institute of Technology (KIT). In March 2021, he was appointed to a tenure-track professorship in "Next Generation Photovoltaics" at KIT. His research group focuses on the fabrication, scaling, characterization, and understanding of perovskite photovoltaics, particularly on perovskite-based tandem photovoltaics.

As of May 2024, Paetzold is a full professor in the Faculty of Electrical Engineering and Information Technology at KIT.

Since February 2023, Paetzold has been a member of the supervisory board of BürgerEnergie Karlsruhe eG i.G.

== Teaching ==
At the Karlsruhe Institute of Technology (KIT), Ulrich Wilhelm Paetzold delivers the lectures "Solar Energy" and *"Fabrication and Characterization of Optoelectronic Devices". Additionally, he oversees laboratory courses on "Solar Energy" and conducts the seminar "Novel Concepts for Solar Energy Harvesting".

== Awards ==
Ulrich W. Paetzold has received numerous awards and honors throughout his academic career. In 2014, he was a DAAD fellow and, in 2013, was awarded the HITEC Communicator Award. He participated in the Lindau Nobel Laureate Meeting in 2012. He was recognized for his outstanding performance in physics at RWTH Aachen University with the Springorum Medal and the Schöneborn Prize in 2010.

In early 2023, Paetzold was awarded the prestigious ERC Consolidator Grant by the European Research Council (ERC) for his project "LAMI-PERO".

== Publications ==
Ulrich W. Paetzold has authored over 200 journal publications and holds multiple patents. As of December 2024, his scientific work has been cited more than 10,000 times, according to Google Scholar.

In 2019, his research group achieved a world record for the highest open-circuit voltage in perovskite solar cells, with results published in Advanced Energy Materials. The paper has become one of the most-cited articles in the journal, with over 400 citations.

In 2022, Paetzold's team published the development of the world's first perovskite-perovskite tandem solar module. His group also holds world records for inkjet-printed perovskite solar cells, achieving a power conversion efficiency of 21.6% for absorbers and 17.2% for fully inkjet-printed cells.

Paetzold's groundbreaking research has garnered attention from national and international media outlets.
