= First Do No Harm (disambiguation) =

First do no harm is one of the principal precepts of bioethics that all students in healthcare are taught in school.

First Do No Harm (or Do No Harm) may refer to:

== Arts and entertainment ==
=== Writing ===
- "The Home Front: First, Do No Harm", a 2007 comic book issue by Adam Beechen and Allan Goldman
- First Do No Harm, a report on medical education by the General Medical Council and Medical Schools Council that Robina Shah helped with

==== Books ====
- First Do No Harm, a 1993 book by Felicity Goodyear-Smith
- First, Do No Harm: The Dramatic Story of Real Doctors and Patients Making Impossible Choices at a Big-City Hospital, a 1993 book by Lisa Belkin
- First Do No Harm, a 2005 collection of writing honoring pathologist Ken Mason
- First Do No Harm – How To Be a Resilient Doctor in the 21st Century, a 2009 book by physician Michael Kidd
- First, Do No Harm, a 2011 book based on the TV series Royal Pains
- Avant tout ne pas nuire, or First, Do Not Harm, a 2017 book by Patrick Froehlich

==== Short stories ====
- "First Do No Harm", a short story by Mildred Downey Broxon in Magic in Ithkar 4, a 1987 anthology
- "First, Do No Harm", a 2006 short story by Kevin Dilmore and Dayton Ward

=== Television episodes ===
- "Do No Harm", an episode of Adventure Time
- "First, Do No Harm", a television episode in All Saints season 3
- "Do No Harm" (Burn Notice), an episode of Burn Notice
- "First Do No Harm", a television episode in Casualty series 19
- "First...Do No Harm", the fifth episode of Commander in Chief (TV series)
- "First Do No Harm", a television episode in Diagnosis: Murder season 5
- "First, Do No Harm", an episode in The Fifth Estate (TV program)
- "First, Do No Harm", an episode in the television show Frasier, season 6
- "First: Do No Harm. Second: Do No Pussy Stuff", a segment from List of Full Frontal with Samantha Bee episodes
- "First Do No Harm", a television episode in Ghost Whisperer season 3
- "First Do No Harm", an episode of Law of the Land (TV series)
- "Do No Harm", an episode of Lie to Me
- "Do No Harm" (Lost), an episode of Lost
- "First Do No Harm", a television episode in List of Space Racers episodes
- "Do No Harm", an episode of Strong Medicine
- "First, Do No Harm", an episode of Who the (Bleep)...

=== Other media ===
- ...First Do No Harm, a 1997 American television film
- "First Do No Harm", a 2012 song by Michael J. Tinker in List of songs about abortion
- Do No Harm (TV series), a 2013 TV series on NBC

== Law and political science ==
- First, do no harm: Ensuring the rights of children with variations of sex characteristics in Denmark and Germany, one of several intersex human rights reports published in 2017
- First Do No Harm, a report of the 2007 special U.S. House of Representatives Committee on Child Abuse authored by its chair, John H. Rogers
- "First Do No Harm? Tort Reform and Birth Outcomes", a 2008 paper by economists W. Bentley MacLeod and Janet Currie
- First Do No Harm: Humanitarian Intervention and the Destruction of Yugoslavia, a 2009 book reviewed in 2014 by Dejan Jović, a Croatian political scientist

== Medicine ==
- Primum non nocere ("first, do no harm"), a principle in bioethics, with similarity to phrases found in the Hippocratic Oath
- Do No Harm: Stories of Life, Death and Brain Surgery, a 2014 book by Henry Marsh
- "Do No Harm" (HR report on Bahrain), a 2011 report by Physicians for Human Rights

== Other uses ==
- Do No Harm (organization), a United States anti-trans advocacy group
- Harm principle, a philosophical concept

== See also ==
- Ahimsa
