= Alice Vansteenberghe =

Member of the French Resistance

- Born: Alice Joly; 18 February 1908; Saint-Étienne, France
- Died: 9 February 1991 (aged 82); Lyon, France
- Occupation: Physician
- Organization: French Resistance
- Known for: Chief medical officer of the French resistance, testifying against Klaus Barbie

Alice Vansteenberghe (née Joly; 18 February 1908 – 9 February 1991) was a physician and a member of the French Resistance in World War II. In 1944, she was captured and tortured by the so-called "Butcher of Lyon", Klaus Barbie. She later testified against him at his trial for crimes against humanity.

== Biography ==
Vansteenberghe was born in Saint-Étienne. Her parents were teachers. She studied at the Lyon Faculty of Medicine to obtain her doctorate. There she met André Vansteenberghe - another medical student on her course - and they married at Lyon's town hall on 21 October 1929. In December 1932, they moved into a large flat at 3 avenue Aristide-Briand, where they also held their general practice. Additionally, Vansteenberghe gave pre-natal advice and medical consultations for infants in the dispensary located in the Palais du Travail in Lyon. She and her husband joined the communist party and she became a freemason in the "Evolution and Concord Lodge". In 1940, she worked as a medical inspector of schools, initially as her husband's replacement after he was called up as a medical officer in the French 6th Army. She was joined by him in the role when he left the army after being wounded, before their communist background led to their dismissal in July 1941 under a new Vichy regime law.

That July, they became part of the French resistance under the influence of Jean-Pierre Lévy and worked together to produce Le Franc-Tireur, the underground newspaper of the movement with the same name. Claudius Billon recruited them directly into the resistance army. They were suspected of being part of the movement, were twice reported by the mayor of Villeurbanne (the area where they lived) to the medical authorities. They exchanged secret messages with London and received materials sent from England by parachute; her code-name was "Geneviève Prunier" and her husband's was "Michel". They were visited in their home by leading Resistance leaders including Henry Frenay, Yvon Morandat, Antoine Avinin and Jean Moulin, the latter sent by Charles de Gaulle in London. As well as treating wounded resistance fighters, they falsified medical evidence to help young men avoid conscription as compulsory labour in Germany. In 1943, they joined the Gallia-RPA network. French police raided their flat in September and questioned them but they were released. On 24 April 1944, the Gestapo raided the flat looking for hidden Jews. They hid in Beaujolais before secretly resuming activity in central Lyon. Vansteenberghe became the chief medical officer of the resistance.

Vansteenberghe was captured on the street on 5 August 1944. While detained in Montluc prison, she was tortured by the Gestapo, sometimes by its local chief, Klaus Barbie. Her nails were pulled out and she was beaten, resulting in broken fingers and five broken vertebrae which disabled her permanently. She did not give up any information to her captors. The prison was liberated on 24 August 1944. André Vansteenberghe found that their flat had been looted, but the couple continued their practice after the war.

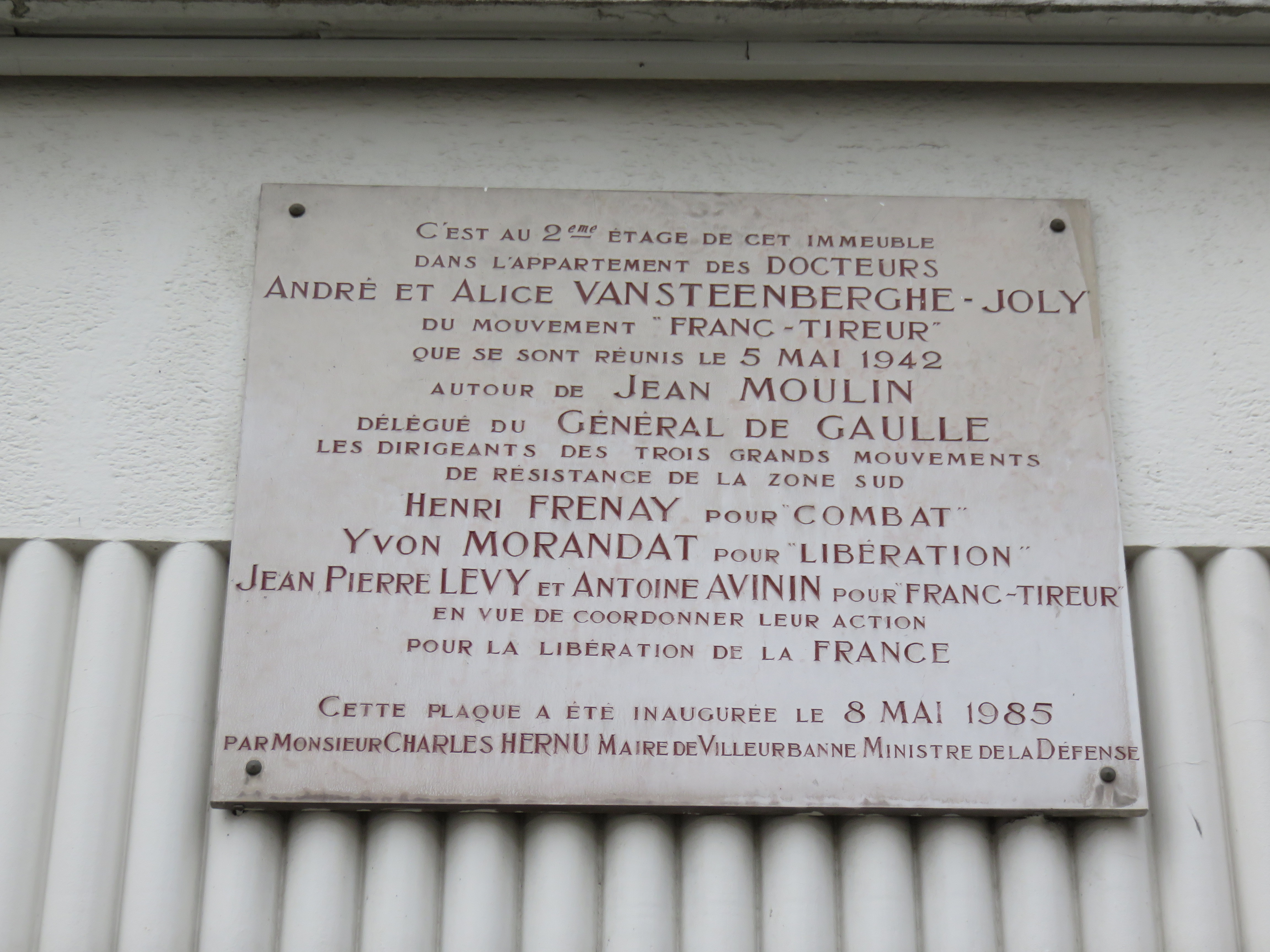
Plaque commemorating the direction of resistance operations from Vansteenberghe's home.

In 1987, Vansteenberghe was a prosecution witness in the case against Klaus Barbie. Following World War 2 and after being protected by working for the US Counterintelligence Corps (which helped to organise his move to Bolivia through Catholic-Church-supported ratlines), Bolivian military authorities and German Foreign Intelligence finally had Barbie arrested and extradited to France from the now-democratic Bolivia in 1983 and indicted in 1984 for his crimes as the Gestapo chief in Lyon between 1942 and 1944. Vansteenberghe testified that after her arrest, Barbie tortured her and broke her back, leaving her disabled for life. In her testimony she stated that she had climbed onto a platform and, from inside her cell, witnessed Barbie directing 4 officers in the deportation of 650 other prisoners to concentration camps. The defence disputed her testimony based on the fact that she "would not have been able to climb onto the platform." She claimed to recognize Barbie by certain unique physical aspects, such as a bump on his earlobe, which she noticed while he was torturing her. She stated that as a member of the Resistance she "expected the worst and made no complaint," but was angered by the torture of non-resistance prisoners. Based on the testimony of Vansteenberghe and others, Barbie was eventually found guilty of crimes against humanity and sentenced to life in prison.

== Awards ==
Vansteenberghe was awarded the Légion d'Honneur and the Médaille de la Résistance.

== Death and legacy ==
She died on 9 February 1991, aged 82, in Martigues (Bouches-du-Rhône), survived by her daughter. A plaque commemorating the historic nature of the resistance meetings held at her home and workplace in Villeurbanne was inaugurated by the mayor of Villeurbanne in 1985. A park honouring her memory and that of her husband, le parc Alice et André Vansteenberghe, was inaugurated in June 1991. She is commemorated at the former Montluc Prison, now the Mémorial National de la Prison de Montluc.
