= Herbin =

Herbin can refer to:

== Last name ==
- Auguste Herbin (1882–1960), French modern artist
- Raphaèle Herbin, French mathematician
- Robert Herbin (1939–2020), French footballer
- René Herbin (1911–1953), French classical pianist

== First name ==
- Herbin Hoyos, exiled Colombian journalist
