= Marivi Fernández-Serra =

Spanish physicist

Maria Victoria (Marivi) Fernández-Serra is a Spanish condensed matter physicist known for her research applying density functional theory to the structure and dynamics of water. Other topics in her research include supercomputer simulations of the quantum-mechanical behavior of liquid-metal interfaces, the design of semiconductor-based nanowires, and the development of sensors for detecting dark matter. She is a professor of physics and astronomy at Stony Brook University.

== Education and career ==
Fernández-Serra earned a bachelor's and master's degree in 1999 and 2001, respectively, at the Autonomous University of Madrid. She completed her Ph.D. in 2004 at the University of Cambridge.

After postdoctoral research in Lyon, France, at Claude Bernard University Lyon 1 and Centre Européen de Calcul Atomique et Moléculaire, she joined the Stony Brook University faculty in 2008.

== Recognition ==
Fernández-Serra was a winner of the Early Career Award of the United States Department of Energy, in 2010. In 2020, Fernández-Serra was named a Fellow of the American Physical Society (APS), after a nomination from the APS Division of Computational Physics, "for extending density functional theory in groundbreaking work on the structure and dynamics of complex materials, and especially for improving understanding of the electronic structure of water, including ice and interfaces".
