= Christian Dumas =

French biologist (born 1943)

Christian Dumas is a French biologist born on January 2, 1943. He is a professor at the École normale supérieure (ENS) in Lyon. Dumas has devoted himself to the study of the specific sexual reproduction mechanisms of flowering plants and their applications for the genetic improvement of cultivated plants. He is also the scientific director of the botanical garden of the Parc de la Tête d'Or in Lyon.

== Course ==
He studied at the IPES (Institut des Professeurs de l'Enseignement Secondaire) at Claude Bernard University (UCB) from 1962 to 1965). From 1965 to 1968, he was a teacher in secondary education including 1 year at the Centre Pédagogique Régional de Lyon. He passed the CAPES in natural sciences in 1968, followed by 2 years as a Volunteer in the National Active Service (VSNA) in Tunisia (Sousse high school).

He was seconded to higher education as an assistant at Claude Bernard University in 1968 and became a doctor of natural sciences in 1975, Assistant Professor at UCB from 1975 to 1984, Visiting Professor, Melbourne University in 1981 and 1984, Professor at the École Normale Supérieure de Saint-Cloud from 1985 to 1986 and at the École Normale Supérieure de Lyon (ENSL, 1987-), where he created and directed the Cellular Recognition and Plant Improvement Laboratory (UCB-LA 879 associated with Institut National de la Recherche Agronomique - INRA, between 1988 and 1992, and EP20 CNRS-LA INRA 879 from 1993 to 1998) then the Plant Reproduction and Development Laboratory (UMR 5667 CNRS, INRA, ENSL and UCB, from 1994 to 2006). He was Visiting Professor, Tohoku University and Miyasaki University (Japan Society of Promotion of Sciences in 1987), Stanford, UCLA, Flagstaff University (Invited by the French Embassy in California).

== Scientific work ==
Dumas first explored the mechanisms of stigmatous secretion: the stigma is in the flower, the female organ that receives pollen (male partner), before engaging in the study of male and female partners in sexual reproduction and their interactions at the origin of seed formation. This is controlled at several levels: a) pollen is accepted or rejected by the female organ through mechanisms governed by the "major sexual incompatibility complex"; b) fertilization is double and its determinism has been studied because female and male gametes have been isolated in vitro; c) the formation of zygotes in vitro and the analysis of mutants also allows the research of genes for early embryo development. In these various key areas of seed production, the team led by Christian Dumas characterized the stigmatic receptor linked to the incompatibility mechanism as well as its ligand, it also characterized the stigmatic and ovular receptivity period and also made it possible to carry out various pollination-fertilization bioassays, including the first in vitro fertilization in flowering plants under physiological conditions close to normal. This work has been carried out in several model and/or interesting species such as maize, cabbage Brassica oleracea and Arabidopsis thaliana, the fruit fly of plant biologists; in addition, the search for genes involved in floral fragrance and flower structure has been initiated in rose as well as preliminary work on the origin of flowering plants using Amborella trichopoda-core species of all current flowering plants endemic to New Caledonia. This work has been carried out within the framework of various international programmes (e.g. CEE, HFPS) and/or collaborations with industrial seed partners (Limagrain, AGPM-Arvalis, Rhône-Poulenc agrochemistry, Elf Sanofi, Orsan Lafarge, etc.).

== Pedagogical activity ==
Dumas has remained close to secondary education through his close links with the Association of Professors of Biology and Geology by organizing practical workshops, training seminars or participating in its events. In addition, he has worked with Pierre Léna, in "La main à la Pâte" in different forms: practices in the "science seed workshops" at the École des Houches or Cargèse. He was involved in the various committees of the French Academy of sciences which led to the creation of the "Fondation La Main à la Pâte" and the creation of the "Maisons pour la Science". He continues to be a referent for the Maison Auvergne and the École des sciences de Chateauneuf-les-Bains.

== Honours ==
He was elected to the French Academy of sciences as Correspondent, Animal and Plant Biology Section in 1989 and then as Member, Integrative Biology Section in 2002 to which he was a delegate between 2011 and 2014. He was elected senior member of the Institut Universitaire de France (IUF) from 1996 to 2006. He has been Professor Emeritus since 2011, he is a member of two Academy commissions: the Teaching Commission (including La Main à la Pâte) and the Environment Commission; he also chaired the working group on the reform of its governance in 2009.

- Correspondent of the French Academy of sciences (1993)
- Associate member of the Royal Academy of Belgium (1994)
- Senior member of the Institut Universitaire de France (1996-2006)
- Member of the French Academy of sciences (2002)
- Member of the Academy of Sciences, Fine Arts and Arts of Lyon (2004)
- Prize of the Academy of Sciences, Fine Arts and Arts of Lyon (2005)
- Chevalier in the Ordre national de la Légion d'Honneur (2013)
- Chevalier in the Ordre national du Mérite (2004)
- Chevalier in the Ordre des Palmes Académiques (2017)

== Bibliography (books) ==
- In : Pollination and crop production, P. Pesson and J. Louveaux eds, INRA series, pp. 3–90 (1984).
- Centenary of Léon Guignard's publication on double fertilization in flowering plants. Day organized by C. Dumas at the French Academy of sciences and published in Volume 324 of the Proceedings of the French Academy of sciences, June 2001, N°6, 505–576.
- La Reproduction, Douin ed., Paris .1 ère ed., 1994, 2de éd. 1998 (coll. D. Robert and C. Bajon), 384 p.
- Qu’est-ce qu’une Rose ? Le pommier ed. Paris, 59 p.
- Plant Biology, J-L. Bonnemain and C. Dumas, 1998, P.U.F., Paris, 125p.
- Russell S.D., Dumas C. (eds) 1992. Sexual Reproduction in Flowering Plants. International Review of Cytology, vol. 140, Academic Press, New York, 680 pages.
- Date Y., Dumas C., Gallais A.(eds). 1994. Reproductive Biology and Plant Breeding (Proceed. XIII Intern.EUCARPIA Congress). Springer Verlag, Berlin, New York, 480 pages.

== Media ==
- Le Maïs, film in collaboration with AGPM, awarded at the Palaiseau Scientific Film Festival, 1994.
- In the name of the flower. www://Futura-sciences, Section : files 01-12-2008
- La Rose, television show A2, June 1, 2007.
- Programs on Canal académie:

- The flower: from birth to reproduction! 2007

- Plants have their hormones, 2009

- Biodiversity explained to high school students, 2010

- The ingenuity of plants to ensure their survival under extreme conditions, 2011

- Orchids of France: 150 fragile and magnificent species, 2011.
