= Yasmine Motarjemi =

French food safety specialist

Yasmine Motarjemi (born 1955) is a French food safety specialist and whistleblower.

== Biography ==
Motarjemi studied chemistry and biology at the Claude-Bernard University in Lyon and food industry techniques at the University of Montpellier, before doing PhD studies in food technology at the University of Lund. She then worked as a research assistant at the same university.

In 1990, she joined the World Health Organisation in Geneva, where she became a scientific expert and Director of Food Security and Food Aid. From 2000, as Corporate Food Safety Manager and Assistant Vice-President, she became responsible for food safety at Nestlé's headquarters in Vevey.

In 2003, following a complaint from parents, she wanted to withdraw from the market baby biscuits manufactured by the multinational. From 2006 onwards, she called for an audit on the toxicity of baby products.

In 2009, a large-scale food poisoning of melamine-contaminated milk incident causing kidney disease affected 300,000 babies in China, 13 of whom died. The director of the offending products was promoted and became her manager. He took away her responsibilities and relegated her to menial tasks. In 2010, she was fired. In March 2011, she filed a complaint against Nestlé with the court of the canton of Vaud for moral and psychological harassment. By a judgement of 7 January 2020, the civil court of appeal recognised the grounds for harassment and that she had been intimidated in an "insidious manner". In 2023, Nestlé withdrew its appeal, and the company had to pay 2 million Swiss francs, 100,000 francs for legal costs and a symbolic 1 symbolic franc for moral damages.

In 2019, she received the GUE/NGL Award for Journalists, Whistleblowers and Defenders of the Right to Information.

Motarjemi was nominated for the Prix Courage 2020 by the Swiss magazine Beobachter, a prize that honours and promotes personalities "who fight fearlessly and with dedication for an idea - for an open, united and fair Switzerland".

== Bibliography ==
- (Co-editor) Encyclopedia on Food Safety, Academic Press, 2014
- Ce que l'empire Nestlé vous cache, Ed Robert Laffont, (in French), 2025, ISBN 978-2221279250
