= Catherine Tallon-Baudry =

Electrophysiologist

Catherine Tallon-Baudry is a CNRS senior researcher and group leader working at the Ecole Normale Supérieure Paris.

== Biography ==
Tallon-Baudry completed her PhD at the Claude Bernard University Lyon 1 in 1997 working with Olivier Bertrand. In 1998 she started as a Marie Curie research fellow in the lab of Andreas Kreiter at the University of Bremen in Germany. In 2002 she won the young researcher award from the Fyssen foundation and started working at the Pitié-Salpêtrière Hospital in Paris. In 2012 she started her own group at the Cognitive Sciences department of the Ecole Normale Supérieure, and in 2014 was the recipient of a European Research Council advanced grant. Tallon-Baudry is a fellow of the Canadian Institute for Advanced Research and associate editor for the journal Neuroscience of Consciousness.

== Research ==
Tallon-Baudry is an electrophysiologist working on the topics of visual consciousness and brain body interactions. Her PhD thesis focused on the role of gamma oscillations in visual integration. She works on the fields of induced gamma-band oscillations and visual consciousness. Her work utilizes a combination of EEG and MEG in healthy participants, intracranial recordings in epileptic patients, and behavioural experimentation methods. Her more recent work focuses on the relationship between signals arising in the viscera, brain dynamics, and cognition.

== Awards and honors ==
- Marie Curie fellowship
- Fyssen foundation young researcher award
- ERC Advanced Grant
- CNRS silver medal

== Publications ==
- Tallon-Baudry C, Bertrand O: Oscillatory gamma activity in humans and its role in object representation. Trends Cogn Sci. 1999 Apr;3(4):151-162. doi: 10.1016/s1364-6613(99)01299-1.
- Tallon-Baudry C: The roles of gamma-band oscillatory synchrony in human visual cognition. Front Biosci (Landmark Ed). 2009 Jan 1;14(1):321-32. doi: 10.2741/3246.
- Tallon-Baudry C, Campana F, Park HD, Babo-Rebelo M: The neural monitoring of visceral inputs, rather than attention, accounts for first-person perspective in conscious vision. Cortex. 2018 May;102:139-149. doi: 10.1016/j.cortex.2017.05.019.
- Damiano Azzalini, Ignacio Rebollo, Catherine Tallon-Baudry: Visceral Signals Shape Brain Dynamics and Cognition, Trends in Cognitive Sciences, Volume 23, Issue 6, 2019, Pages 488-509, https://doi.org/10.1016/j.tics.2019.03.007.
- Catherine Tallon-Baudry: The topological space of subjective experience, Trends in Cognitive Sciences, Volume 26, Issue 12, 2022, Pages 1068-1069, https://doi.org/10.1016/j.tics.2022.09.002.
- Loescher, M., Haggard, P., & Tallon-Baudry, C. (2025): Interoception vs. Exteroception: Cardiac interoception competes with tactile perception, yet also facilitates self-relevance encoding. Proceedings of the National Academy of Sciences, 122(49), e2516229122.
