= Sylvie Benzoni =

French mathematician

Sylvie Benzoni-Gavage (born 1967) is a French mathematician known for her research in partial differential equations, fluid dynamics, traffic flow, shock waves, and phase transitions. In 2017 she was named as the director of the Institut Henri Poincaré.

== Education and career ==
Benzoni was a student at the École normale supérieure de Saint-Cloud. She completed her Ph.D. in 1991 at the Claude Bernard University Lyon 1; her dissertation, supervised by Denis Serre, was Analyse numerique des modeles hydrodynamiques d'ecoulements diphasiques instationnaires dans les reseaux de production petroliere.

She became a researcher at CNRS in 1992, and in 2003 became a professor at Claude Bernard University. After five years as assistant director at the Camille Jordan Institute in Lyon, she became director there in 2016.

== Contributions ==
With her advisor Denis Serre, Benzoni is the author of Multi-dimensional Hyperbolic Partial Differential Equations: First-Order Systems and Applications (Oxford University Press, 2007) and the editor of Hyperbolic Problems: Theory, Numerics, Applications (Springer, 2008). She is the author of a French textbook on differential calculus and differential equations, Calcul différentiel et équations différentielles: Cours et exercices corrigés (Dunod, 2010; 2nd ed., 2014).

Benzoni is also active in communicating mathematics to the public, through her work with the European Mathematical Society, and is a supporter of open access publishing of research.
