= Patrick Mehlen =

French biologist

Patrick Mehlen (born in 1968), is a French biologist and research director at the Centre national de recherche scientifique (CNRS) at the Centre Léon-Bérard, a cancer research centre in Lyon.

== Education ==
Patrick Mehlen, a former student at the École normale supérieure de Lyon, defended his Ph.D. thesis at the Claude-Bernard University in 1995. From 1997 to 1998 he spent two sabbatical years at the Burnham Institute for Medical Research, program on "Aging and Cell Death" - Pr. D.E. Bredesen. Back in France, he became head of the "Apoptosis and Differentiation" group in the laboratory - CNRS UMR5534, CGMC until 2004. Then he became director of the "Apoptosis, Cancer and Development" research unit - CNRS FRE2870 then UMR5238 at the Léon Bérard Centre until 2011. He joined the Lyon Cancer Research Centre, where he became the director in 2019. He is also Director of Translational Research and Innovation at the Léon Bérard Centre since 2013, Director of the DEVweCAN Laboratory of Excellence since 2011 and Director of the Rabelais Institute for Interdisciplinary Cancer Research (Convergence Institute) since 2018.

== Research ==
Patrick Mehlen was one of the discoverers of the addictive receptor paradigm: from an original mechanism of cell death to clinical trials; explained below and which constitutes the presentation of his scientific work.

A few years ago, an original concept of cell biology was proposed: while classical dogma assumed that transmembrane receptors are inactive unless bound by their specific ligand, it was proposed that some receptors could be active not only in the presence of their ligand, but also in their absence. In the latter case, the downstream signalling of these unbound receptors leads to programmed cell death, also called apoptosis. These receptors have therefore been called "dependent receptors" because their presence on the cell surface makes the cell's survival dependent on the presence in the cell environment of its respective ligand. To date, Mehlen and his collaborators have identified or participated in the identification of the most well known dependent receptors.

Beyond the fundamental interest of studying a receptor capable of transducing two antagonistic signals - a "positive" one in the presence of ligands leading to cell differentiation, proliferation or migration and a "negative" one in the absence of ligands leading to cell suicide, they proposed that this dual function could lead these receptors to play a key role both during embryonic development and in regulating tumorigenesis.

In the context of their involvement in embryonic development, they hypothesized that the pro-apoptotic activity of these dependence receptors is crucial for the development of the nervous system as a mechanism "allowing" neural guidance, migration or localization in ligand situations. Thus, they found that the Sonic Hedgehog (Shh) Patched receptor is a dependency receptor and that its ability to induce apoptosis in the absence of Shh is essential for adequate neural tube development. They also showed that the receptors of netrin-1 DCC and UNC5H regulate the death/survival of specific neurons during the development of the nervous system. This involvement is not limited to the developing nervous system, as they have shown the importance of UNC5H-induced apoptosis in the formation of blood vessels - angiogenesis.

In the context of cancer, they hypothesized that these receptors are tumor suppressors that would limit cancer progression by inducing apoptosis of tumor cells outside the territories of ligand accessibility/availability. They were particularly interested in receptors that bind to the netrin-1 ligand -i.e., DCC and UNC5H-. They have shown that DCC and UNC5H are all dependency receptors in cancer cells: whereas in the presence of their netrin-1 ligand, they transduce classical "positive" signals, in the absence of netrin-1, they actively trigger apoptosis. Interestingly, DCC and UNC5H are considered tumor suppressors because their expression is lost in many cancers suggesting that the presence of these receptors is a constraint to tumor progression. This has in fact been formally proven by showing that in mice, the invalidation of UNC5H3, the overexpression of netrin-1 in the digestive tract or the specific inactivation of pro-apoptotic DCC activity similarly caused cancer progression. Thus, aggressive cancers that develop are cancers for which tumor cells block the pathways of dependent receptors and a mechanism for this inactivation of this cell death pathway is that tumor cells acquire an autocrine secretion of netrin-1. These researchers then showed that an agent blocking the interaction between netrin-1 and its receptors allowed in vitro to lead to the death of tumor cells and in animals to control tumor progression. With this in mind, they have generated a drug candidate - anti-netrin-1/NP137 antibody - which is currently being tested in patients with very advanced cancers with very encouraging signs of clinical activity.

== Honours ==
Mehlen was elected in 2013 to the French Academy of sciences.
