= Nouria Salehi =

Afghan-Australian nuclear physicist, biophysicist and humanitarian

Nouria Salehi AM
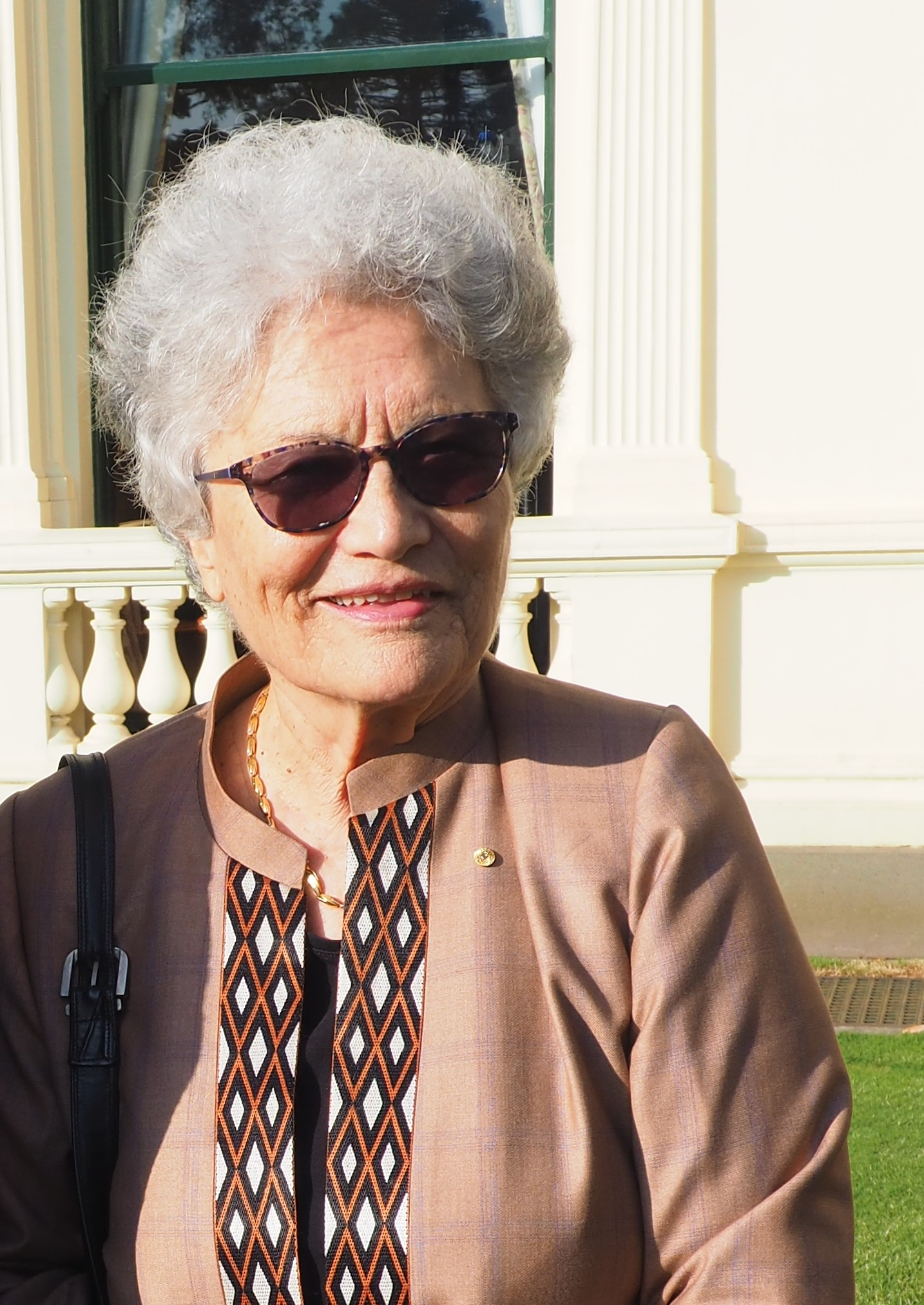
- Salehi in January 2020
- Born: Afghanistan
- Education: Kabul University
- Alma mater: Claude Bernard University
- Awards: Victorian Senior Australian of the Year (2012); Victorian Honour Roll of Women (2021)

Nouria Sultana Salehi AM is an Afghan-Australian nuclear physicist, biophysicist and humanitarian. She is the founder of the Afghan Australian Development Organisation.

== Early life and education ==
Salehi was born in Afghanistan and was educated at Kabul University. She graduated with a PhD from the Claude Bernard University in Lyon, France.

== Career ==
Salehi began practising nuclear medicine in Kabul but chose to migrate to Australia in 1981, shortly before the Russian invasion.

Salehi worked as a nuclear physicist and biophysicist with Melbourne Health from 1983 to 2017, most recently in the Department of Nuclear Medicine at the Royal Melbourne Hospital.

She founded the Afghan Australian Development Organisation in 2001 and serves as its executive director. She also founded the Afghan Australian Volunteers Association and was president from 2002 to 2006. She has also served as a committee member for a number of other refugee, ecumenical and human rights groups.

== Awards and recognition ==
Salehi was awarded the Medal of the Order of Australia in the 1997 Queen's Birthday Honours for "service to human rights, particularly through the Afghan community, and to refugees and women's support groups". She received the Centenary Medal in 2001 and was promoted to Member of the Order of Australia in the 2019 Australia Day Honours for "significant service to the Afghan, migrant and refugee communities".

Salehi was named Victorian Senior Australian of the Year in 2012 and was inducted onto the Victorian Honour Roll of Women in 2021. She was made a life member of The Order of Australia Association in 1997 and has served as an Australia Day Ambassador since 2012.
