= Marta Macho Stadler =

Spanish mathematics and scientific disseminator

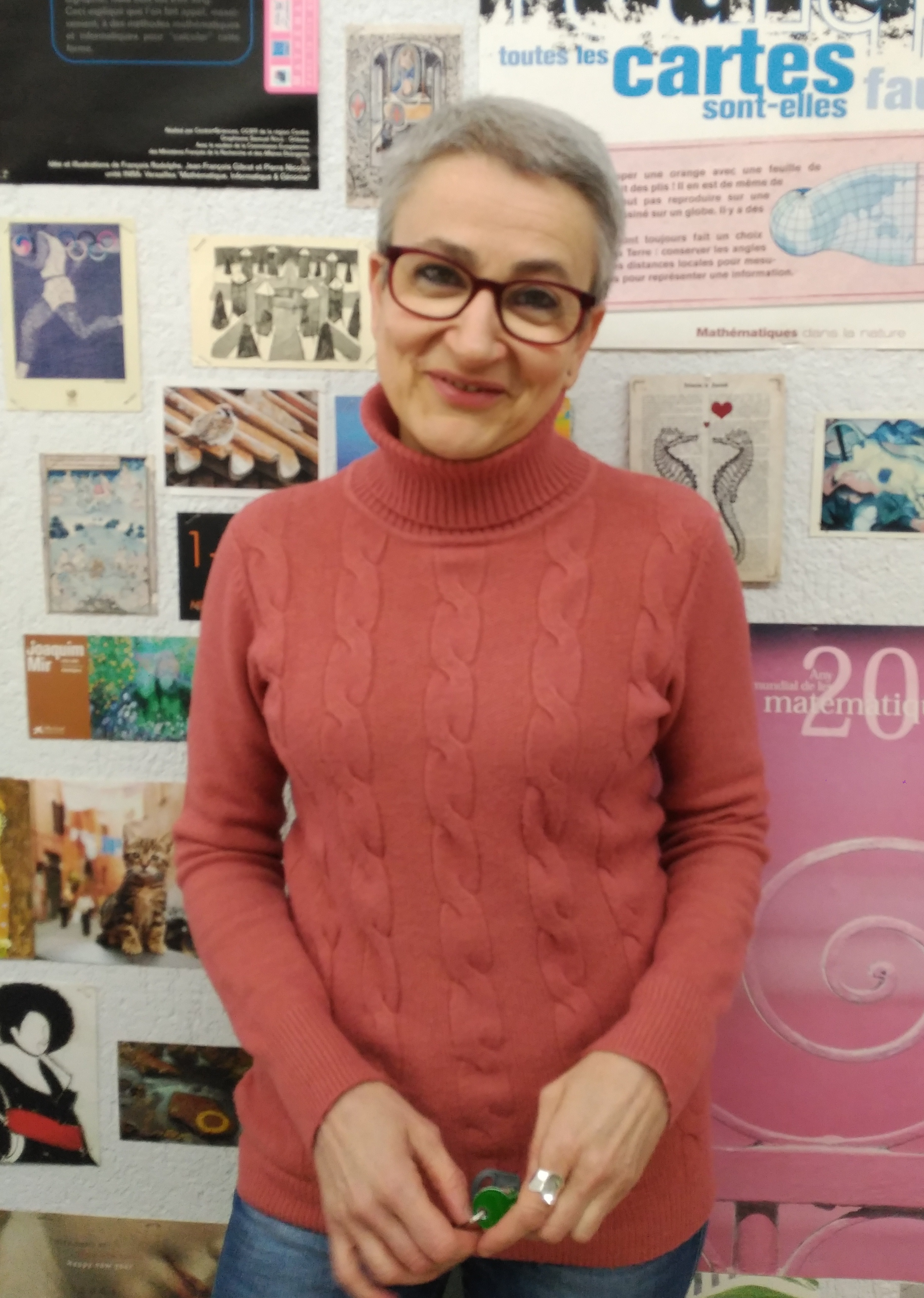
- Born: Marta Macho Stadler; 9 September 1962 (age 63); Bilbao, Spain
- Scientific career
- Fields: Mathematics

Marta Macho Stadler (Bilbao, 1962) is a Basque mathematician, expert in scientific divulgation. She teaches undergraduate courses on geometry and topology at the University of the Basque Country UPV/EHU and her research area is the Geometric Theory of Foliations and Noncommutative Geometry. She is editor in chief of the digital blog Mujeres con Ciencia (Women with Science) of the Scientific Culture Chair UPV/EHU and has been awarded several prizes, among others the Emakunde Equality Prize 2006.

== Professional career ==
Macho obtained a degree in mathematics from the University of the Basque Country in 1985, and started working as a lecturer in the Department of Mathematics at the same university. In 1987, she did research with Professor Gilbert Hector at the University Claude Bernard in Lyon, where she finished her 1996 Ph.D. thesis Isomorphisme de Thom pour les feuilletages presque sans holonomie (Thom isomorphism for foliation almost without holonomy). She is now associate professor of geometry and topology at the UPV/EHU. Her primary research area is the geometric theory of foliations.

Macho teaches the subjects of topology and ampliation of topology (third and fourth courses) of the undergraduate degree of mathematics at the Department of Science and Technology of the University of the Basque Country UPV/EHU and the optional topic "Mathematics in daily life: society and culture in the Classroom of Experience of Biscay UPV/EHU". She is an instructor of the master's degree in modelling and mathematics research, statistics and computing (MATG6), and specific master in mathematics and applied mathematics research.

=== Scientific contributions ===
Macho's activities in scientific divulgation started in 1999, when she collaborated in the organization of a conference cycle titled "A stroll through geometry" during 10 academic courses. One of her main interests in divulgation is the visibility of women's contributions in the scientific world.

Macho is a member of the Women's Commission of the Royal Spanish Mathematical Society (RSME, from Spanish) and an active collaborator in several social activities to improve the connection between science and civil society.

One of the main areas of her interest concerns scientific divulgation and the presence of mathematics in literature, which lead her to study the relation between scientific content and mathematical structure with texts from novels, comics, poetry, and plays. She is the main contributor to the sections "Literature and Mathematics" and "Theatre and Mathematics" in DivulgaMAT of the RSME. She has collaborated in different activities in cultural spaces or educational institutions in order to involve students and ordinary people in science and also has collaborated in different blogs, such as ZTFNews.org (Science and Technology Department, UPV/EHU) and Cuaderno de cultura científica ("Scientific culture notebook", Scientific culture chair, UPV/EHU). She also organizes the cultural event "Ellas hacen ciencia" ("They make science"), held yearly in the Bidebarrieta Library of Bilbao.

Since 2010, Macho is part of the Parity Commission of the Department of Science and Technology of the University of the Basque Country UPV/EHU, and since 2015, she is a member of the Cooperation Council of the same university. Since 2011 she is a member of the Female Researchers and Technologists Association (AMIT, from Spanish).

In May 2014, she created the digital space named "Women with science", which belongs to the Scientific Culture Chair of the University of the Basque Country, where she is the editor in chief. The purpose of "Women with science" is to spread the role of women in science and make visible the important work and contributions of past pioneers and present researchers, including cross-curricular subjects such as science and gender inequalities.

In 2015, she was awarded the Equality Prize from the Universidad de Alicante because of her contributions to scientific divulgation and actions supporting the visibility of women's scientific milestones for social development. She also received the medal of the Royal Spanish Mathematical Society due to her contributions to the divulgation of mathematics, her compromise with gender equality, and her work building bridges of knowledge between teachers of mathematics and different educational statements.

In November 2016, she was awarded the Emakunde Equality Prize as a recognition of her work in high-quality divulgation and promotion of women's scientific knowledge—including gender perspective—and her work in scientific and educational commissions to promote gender equality in the university. The money associated with the award was donated to refugee women and victims of gender violence who are studying at the University of the Basque Country.

Macho is coauthor of a handbook titled Mujeres en la Ciencia (Women in Science), an educational guide on the role of women in the history of science.

== Awards ==
- 2015 Equality prize of the Universidad de Alicante
- 2015 Medal of the Royal Spanish Mathematical Society
- 2016 Ekamunde Equality Prize
- 2019 Illustrious of Bilbao, for her work as a science communicator and for making visible the role of women in science.
- 2021 Finalist in the VII Edition of the Avanzadoras de 20Minutos and Intermón Oxfam Award.
- 2023 Lilly Foundation Award for Scientific Dissemination.
- 2023 Women Scientists Award, awarded by Muy Interesante magazine.

== Publications ==
- Topología general (General topology, 2002) Universidad del País Vasco
- Mujeres en la Ciencia. Guía didáctica sobre el papel de la mujer en la historia de la Ciencia (Women in science. Didactic guide about the role of women in the history of science, 2011). Coauthor. Universidad del País Vasco.
