= Wojciech Jurczak =

Wojciech Jan Jurczak (born August 9, 1966, in Kraków, Poland) is a Polish hematologist. His research focuses on blood cancers, particularly lymphomas and chronic lymphocytic leukemia. He is a professor of hematology and a Chair of the Department of Lymphoid Malignancies at the Maria Skłodowska‑Curie National Research Institute of Oncology in Kraków. He is a member of European Hematology Association (EHA), the American Society of Hematology (ASH) and the American Society of Clinical Oncology.

== Education and career ==
Jurczak graduated with distinction from the Medical Academy in Kraków in 1990, and completed additional coursework in mathematics and physics at the Jagiellonian University. He joined the academic staff of the Department of Hematology at the Jagiellonian University Medical College (UJ CM), where he led the lymphoma treatment team from 1992 and served as the Head of Department from 2018.

== Research ==
Jurczak's early research focused on the use of monoclonal antibodies to treat B-cell lymphomas, including radioimmunotherapy and stem cell transplantation. He has co-authored studies on treatments for blood cancers, including BTK inhibitors, PI3K inhibitors, venetoclax, which targets the BCL-2 protein and belinostat, an HDAC inhibitor.

His research has also examined combinations of treatments and targeted therapies for lymphoma.

Jurczak has co-authored clinical research published in The New England Journal of Medicine, Blood, Journal of Clinical Oncology, The Lancet, The Lancet Oncology, and Annals of Oncology. His publications cover targeted therapies, antibody–drug conjugates, and immunotherapies for blood cancers.
