= Teresa Torres =

Chilean palaeontologist

- Education: BSc Universidad de Santiago; PhD Claude Bernard University
- Scientific career
- Fields: Palaeontology; Paleobotany
- Workplaces: Universidad de Chile

Teresa Torres is a Chilean palaeontologist best known for her work linking Antarctic fossils to those found in Patagonia, Chile. She is a professor at the Universidad de Chile, and was one of the first Chilean women to study petrified forests in Antarctica.

== Early life and education ==
Torres grew up in Santiago and graduated as a physics schoolteacher at Universidad de Santiago. She completed postgraduate studies in Physics at Rennes University. She then completed a PhD in Paleobotany at Claude Bernard University, Lyon.

== Career and impact ==
Torres has been a professor at Universidad de Chile since 1971. She was a pioneer for Chilean women working in Antarctica. She has led projects to investigate links between Patagonia and the Antarctic peninsula through the study of fossilised plants and animals. She discovered 200 million year old fossilized leaves in Antarctica that appear similar to the conifers of southern Chile. She has participated in 20 expeditions to Antarctica.

In addition to peer-reviewed papers, Torres has also written books on Antarctica and popular palaeobotanical guides. She was a founding Member of Asociación Chilena de Paleontología.
