= Claude Bernard University Lyon 1 =

Public university of Lyon, France

- Université Claude-Bernard Lyon 1
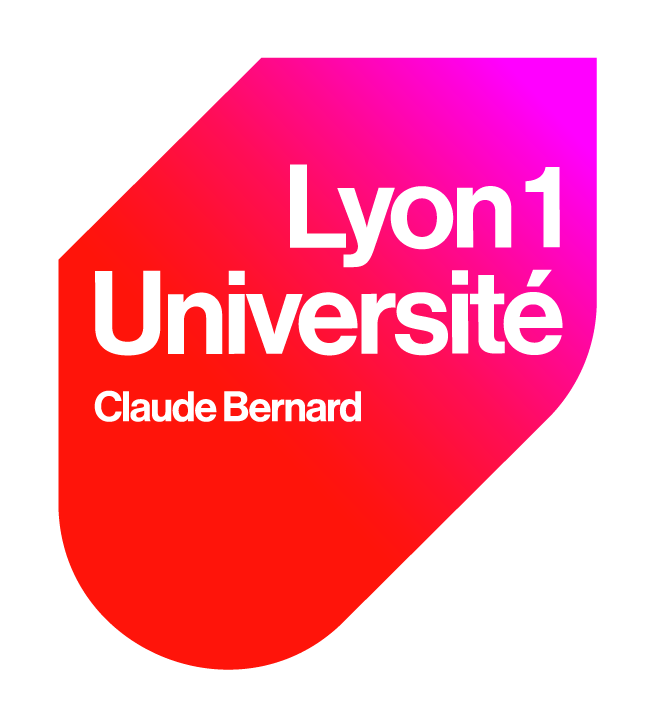
- Logo of Lyon 1 University, in use since 2026.
- Type: Public
- Established: 1971
- Affiliations: University of Lyon
- Budget: €420.5 M (2020)
- President: Bruno Lina
- Faculty: 2,857
- Administrative staff: 1,766
- Students: 47,860
- Location: Villeurbanne, France; 45.78098°N 4.86759°E
- Campus: Urban
- Website: www.univ-lyon1.fr

Lyon 1 Claude Bernard University (French: Université Lyon 1 Claude-Bernard, UCBL, known as Lyon 1) is one of the three public universities of Lyon, France. It is named after the French physiologist Claude Bernard and specialises in science and technology, medicine, and sports science. It was established in 1971 by the merger of the 'faculté des sciences de Lyon' with the 'faculté de médecine'.

The main administrative, teaching and research facilities are located in Villeurbanne, with other campuses located in Gerland, Rockefeller, and Laennec in the 8th arrondissement of Lyon. Attached to the university are the Hospices Civils de Lyon, including the 'Centre Hospitalier Lyon-Sud', which is the largest teaching hospital in the Rhône-Alpes region and the second-largest in France.

The university has been independent since January 2009. In 2020 it managed an annual budget of over €420 million and had 2857 faculty.

== History ==
On 17 March 1808, Napoleon I founded the University of France, a national organisation with responsibility for formal education from primary through to university level. This decree created the Academy of Lyon within the university and established the Lyon Faculty of Science. The Lyon Faculty of Medicine was founded on 8 November 1874 and was later merged with the Faculty of Science on 8 December 1970 to create Claude Bernard University.

== Locations and buildings ==
=== Main sites ===
The university is not located on a single campus but has departments and other facilities distributed across several key sites throughout Lyon and the wider region. The LyonTech-la Doua campus located north of Villeurbanne and east of Lyon's Parc de la Tête d'Or hosts the administrative headquarters of the university as well as its Faculties of Science and Technology and of Sport Sciences.

A second key site, the Lyon Health East Campus, is located in the eighth arrondissement next to the Edouard Herriot hospital and the Vinatier medical centre. It hosts the Faculty of Odontology and the Lyon East Faculty of Medicine, in addition to several research institutes dedicated to medical and biological sciences.

== Areas of study ==
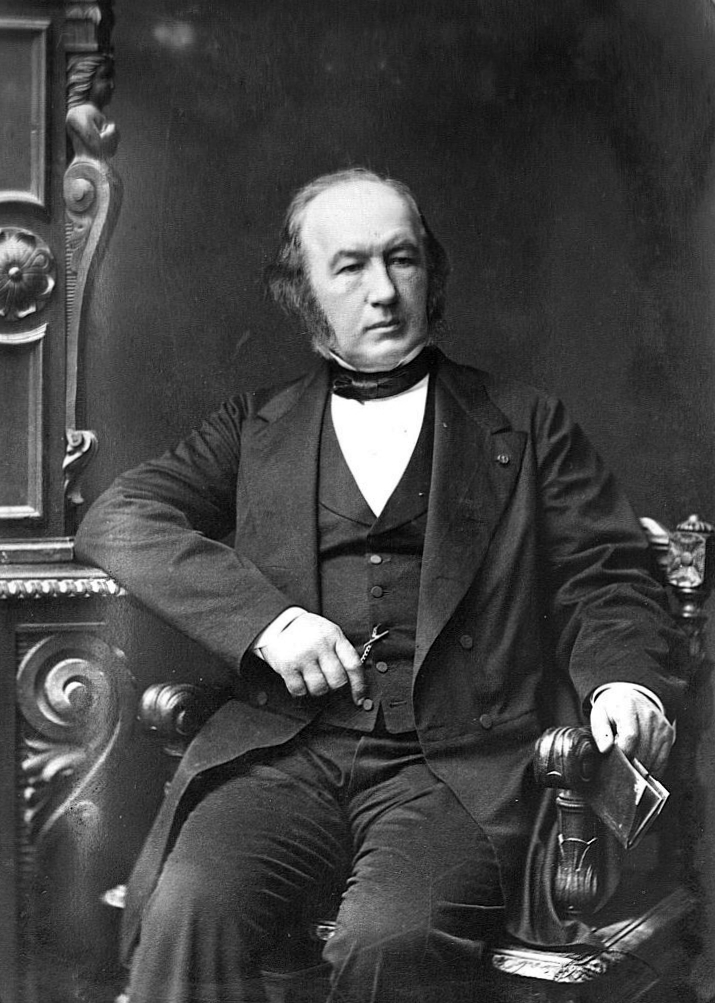
Claude Bernard

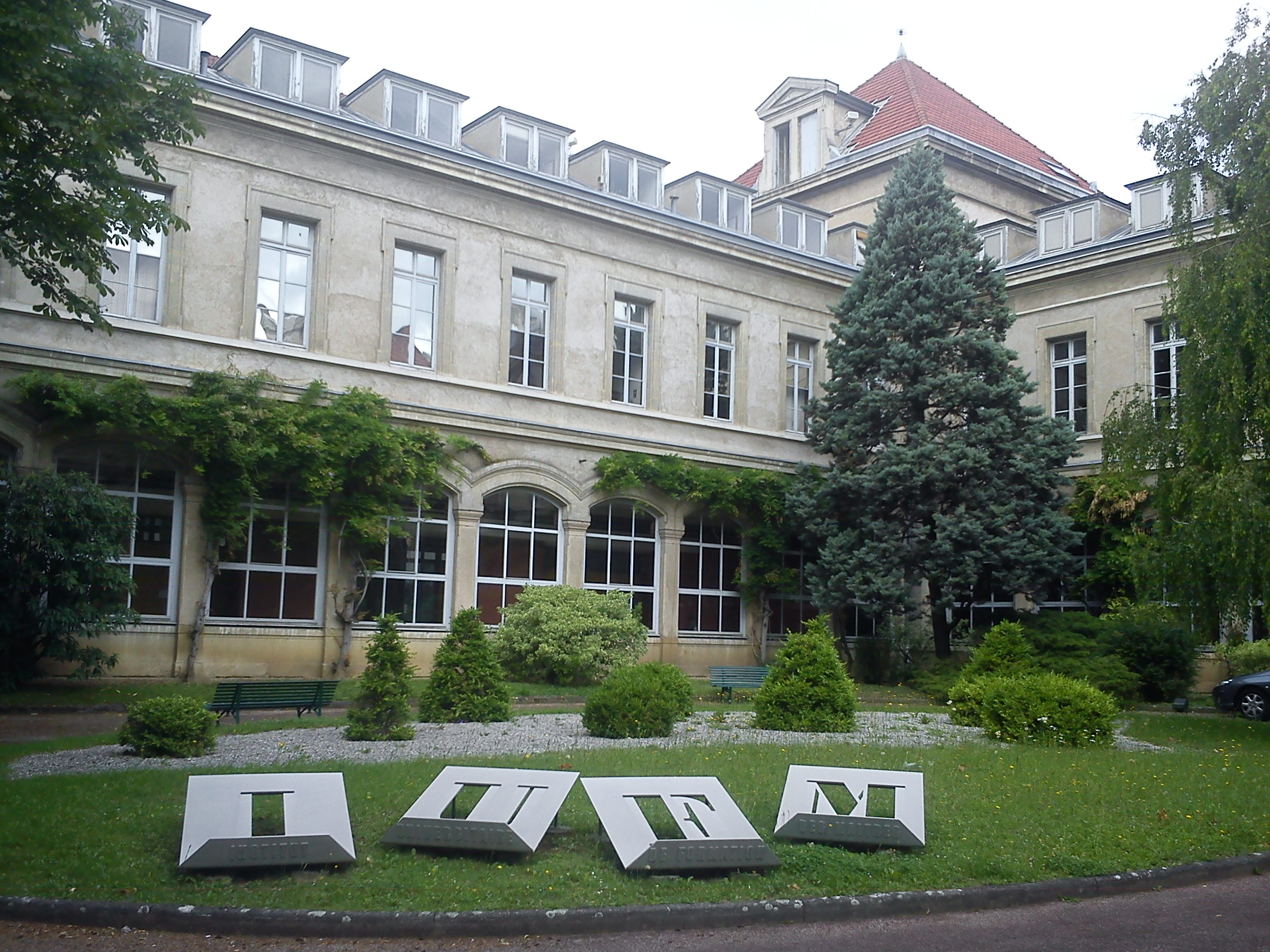
Institut Universitaire de Formation des Maîtres

=== Natural science ===
- Biology
- Chemistry and Biochemistry
- Mathematics
- Physics
- Earth science
- Electrical engineering
- Computer science
- Mechanical engineering

=== Public health ===
- Medicine
- Pharmacy
- Odontology
- Audiology
- Occupational therapy
- Physiotherapy
- Speech therapy
- Ophthalmology
- Psychomotricity

=== Other ===
- Sport (STAPS, "Sciences et Techniques des Activités Physiques et Sportives")
- Observatory of Lyon
- ISFA, Graduate School of Actuarial Studies (ISFA, "Institut de Science Financière et d'Assurances")
- Engineering school École polytechnique universitaire de l'université Lyon-I

University rankings

Global – Overall
- ARWU World: 201–300 (2023)
- QS World: =587 (2026)
- THE World: 401–500 (2024)

National – Overall
- ARWU National: 9–12
- THE National: 11–16

== Reputation ==
The university was ranked 9-11 out of universities in France and in the 201–300 band of world universities by Academic Ranking of World Universities 2021.

== Notable faculty ==
=== Mathematics ===
- Geneviève Comte-Bellot (born 1929) – physicist
- John Adrian Bondy (born 1942) – mathematician
- Michelle Schatzman (1949–2010) – mathematician
- Jean-Louis Nicolas – number theorist
- Pierre Auger (born 1953) – bio-mathematician
- Fokko du Cloux (1954–2006) – Dutch mathematician and computer scientist
- Christian Krattenthaler (born 1958) – mathematician
- Marta Macho Stadler (born 1962) – Basque mathematician
- Marie-France Sagot – computational biologist
- Isabelle Daniel – mineralogist
- Marivi Fernández-Serra – physicist
- Tuna Altınel (born 1966) – mathematician
- Sylvie Benzoni (born 1967) – mathematician
- Vincent Calvez (born 1981) – mathematician

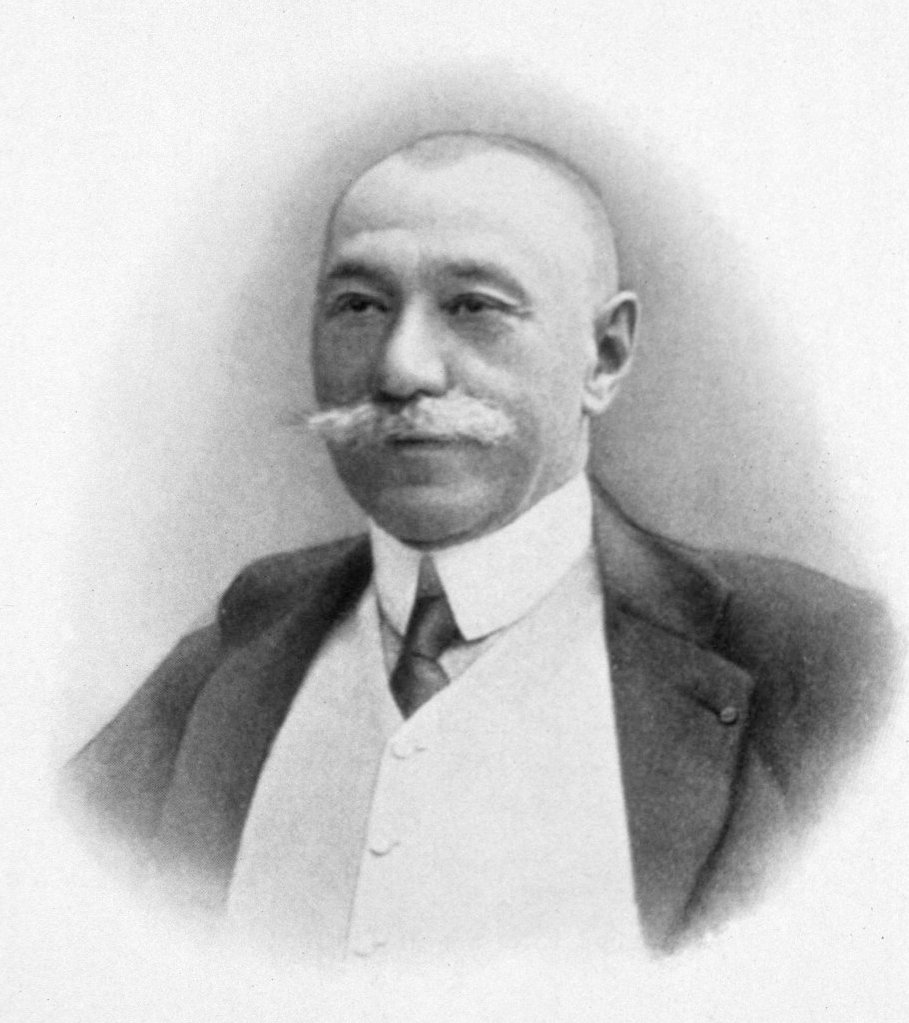
Antonin Poncet

=== Medicine ===
- Antonin Poncet (1849–1913) – surgeon
- Jean-Louis Touraine (born 1945) – professor of medicine
- Gilles Salles – haematologist
- Véronique Trillet-Lenoir (born 1957) – oncologist and politician
- Patrick Froehlich (born 1961) – physician and novelist
- David Servan-Schreiber (1961–2011) – physician and neuroscientist

== Notable alumni ==
=== Academic ===
- Roger Guillemin, French National Medal of Science in 1976, Nobel Prize for medicine in 1977
- Cécile Mourer-Chauviré (born 1939) – paleontologist
- Christian Dumas (born 1943) – biologist
- Jean Bellissard (born 1946) – mathematical physicist
- Francis Clarke (born 1948) – mathematician
- Rabesa Zafera Antoine (born 1950) – plant biologist, university president
- Muhammad Baydoun (1952–2022) – Lebanese mathematician and politician
- Jean Decety (born 1960) – neuroscientist
- Uwe Rau – German physicist
- Teresa Torres – Chilean paleontologist
- Raphaèle Herbin – mathematician
- Nouria Salehi – Afghan-Australian nuclear physicist, biophysicist and humanitarian
- Patrick Mehlen (born 1968) – biologist
- Hélène Courtois (born 1970) – astrophysicist
- Catherine Tallon-Baudry – electrophysiologist
- Theodora Hatziioannou – virologist
- Victor Grignard – chemist, 1912 Nobel Prize in Chemistry
- Alexis Carrel – surgeon and biologist, 1912 Nobel Prize in Medicine

=== Sports ===
- Ahmad Ahmad (born 1959) – Malagasy football manager and politician
- Louisa Cadamuro (born 1967) – professional footballer
- Gwendal Peizerat (born 1972) – ice dancer
- Romain Haguenauer (born 1976) – ice dancing coach
- Assile Toufaily (born 1996) – footballer

=== Other ===
- André Vansteenberghe (1906–1984) – physician and member of French resistance
- Alice Vansteenberghe (1908–1991) – physician and member of French resistance
- Sami Khiyami (born 1948) – Syrian engineer and diplomat
- Yasmine Motarjemi (born 1955) – food safety specialist
- Marine Lorphelin (born 1993) – model and beauty pageant title holder

== See also ==
- List of colleges and universities
- List of modern universities in Europe (1801–1945)
