= Tuna Altınel =

Turkish mathematician (born 1966)

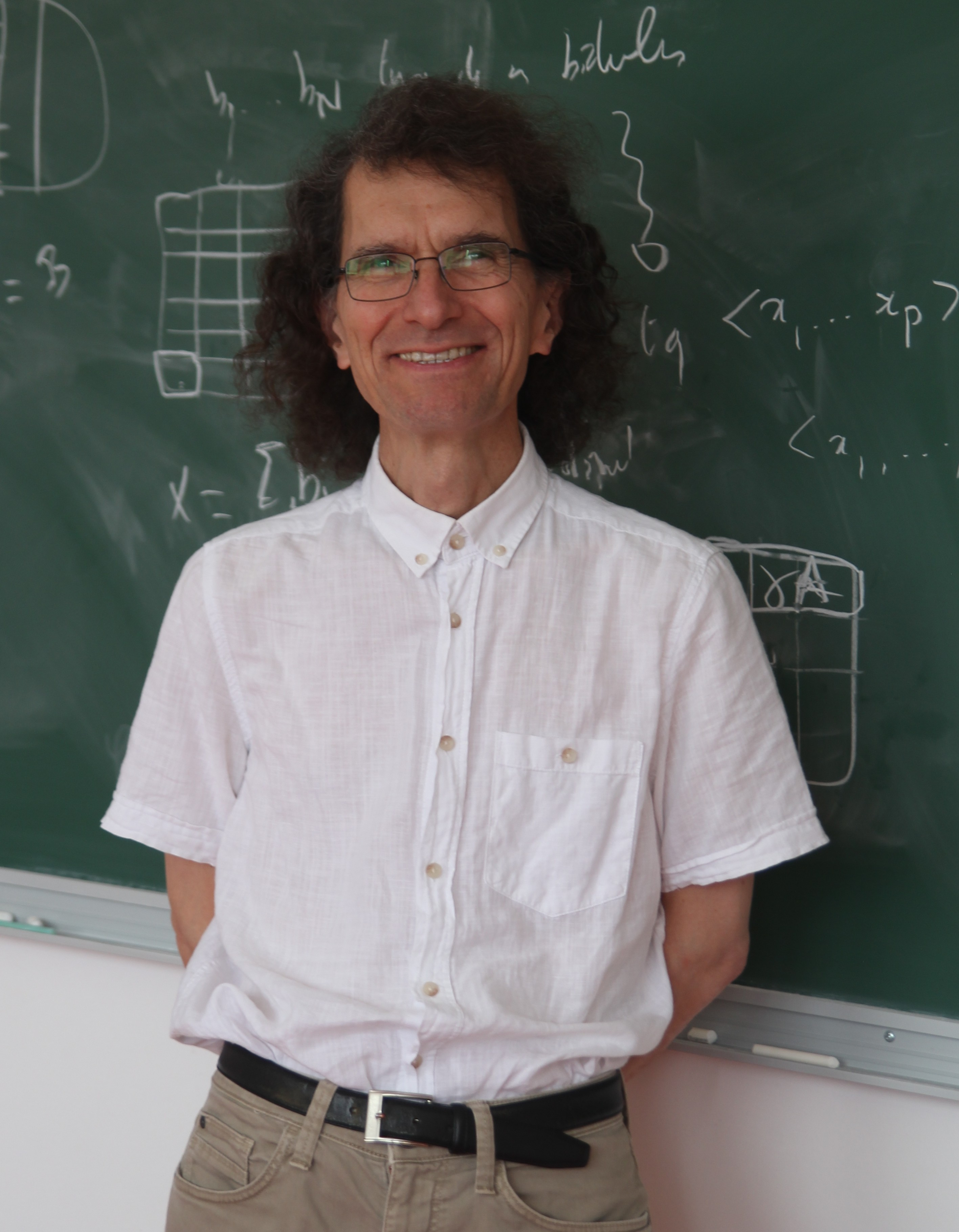
Tuna Altınel

Tuna Altınel is a Turkish mathematician, born February 12, 1966, in Istanbul, who has worked at the University Lyon 1 in France since 1996. He is a specialist in group theory and mathematical logic. With Alexandre Borovik and Gregory Cherlin, he proved a major case of the Cherlin–Zilber conjecture.

Altınel is active in the Academics for Peace movement, which supports a peaceful resolution of the conflict in south-eastern Turkey, and calls for the human rights of the civilian population to be respected. Accused by the Turkish authorities of membership in a terrorist organization, Altınel has been imprisoned since May 11, 2019, at the Kepsut prison in Turkey.

== Education and career ==
After undergraduate studies in mathematics and computer science at Boğaziçi University, Istanbul, Altınel received his doctorate from Rutgers University (New Jersey, United States) under the direction of Gregory Cherlin. In 1996 he joined the department of mathematics of the university Lyon-1, as maître de conférences, and completed his French habilitation in 2001.

Altınel has written 26 mathematical articles, principally on the subject of groups in model theory, more particularly groups of finite Morley rank and the Cherlin–Zilber Algebraicity Conjecture, concerning the structure of the simple groups of finite Morley rank. He is joint author with Alexandre Borovik and Gregory Cherlin of a book in which this conjecture is proved in the case of infinite 2-rank, after the development of a body of machinery analogous to certain chapters of finite simple group theory.

Altınel's doctoral advisees include Éric Jaligot, winner of the 2000 Sacks Prize, a prize given annually for an outstanding doctoral thesis in mathematical logic (doctoral thesis supervised jointly by Tuna Altınel and Bruno Poizat). He is active in the domain of scientific cooperation with Turkey; in particular, he was an organizer of an international mathematics conference held in Istanbul in 2016 in honor of Alexandre Borovik and Ali Nesin (Leelavati prize winner, 2018).

== Political activities ==
=== Overview ===
Altınel has been an active supporter of a peaceful resolution of the conflict in southeastern Turkey and of human rights and civil liberties in Turkey.

With regard to the Kurdish conflict in southeastern Turkey, he was one of 116 academics who signed a 2003 letter in support of a peaceful resolution of that conflict, among the first group of signatories of a similar peace petition in January 2016 that garnered 1128 signatures at the time of its promulgation under the title "We will not be parties to this crime," among the 132 intellectuals calling for assistance to those wounded in the conflict at Cizre, and one of 170 academics to sign a letter in 2018 opposing the Afrin operation. On February 21, 2019, he acted as translator for a former member of parliament of the Peoples' Democratic Party (HDP) at a public meeting in Lyon, France, in which a documentary on the Cizre massacres was shown, followed by a discussion.

With the resumption of active conflict in August 2015 following a period of relative calm, Altınel reached out to the affected community and began to visit the areas involved in September 2015. His own account of these activities is quoted below, from subsequent court testimony.

With the trials of the signatories of the January 2016 petition and the broader wave of repression following the attempted coup of July 2016, described in more detail below, questions of academic freedom and freedom of speech become more prominent. Altınel's actions in this direction include

- a petition responding to the suicide of Mehmet Fatih Traş, an academic fired for his involvement with the peace petition (February 2017)
- denunciation of the role of the Turkish research council TÜBİTAK in the state of emergency following the attempted coup d'état of 2016 (April 2017); the CNRS Scientific Council voted unanimously to recommend to the CNRS to reconsider its agreements concerning collaboration with TÜBİTAK (April 24–25, 2017).
- publication of a review article on the trials of the Academics for Peace entitled "Les procès contre les Universitaires pour la paix : extraits d’une comédie politico-juridique (The trials of the Academics for Peace: scenes from a politico-juridical spectacle)".
- petition in support of Academic for Peace Füsün Üstel

These activities have led to two separate court cases against Altınel in Turkey and his social media postings have been used to justify the second of these cases.

=== January 2016 petition and Academics for Peace ===
Altınel was one of the first signatories of the January 2016 peace petition entitled "We will not be parties to this crime!", which was promulgated by the Academics for Peace on January 11, 2016.

The following day, President Erdoğan publicly criticized the signatories, and within a few days 27 had been arrested." At the same time foreign reaction was strongly supportive of the signatories.

The peace petition ultimately garnered 2212 signatures of academics, largely in Turkey. Altınel is one of over 750 signatories from the first group of 1128 such who have been prosecuted or sentenced as individuals for that act under Turkish Anti-Terrorism legislation, through June 2019, on a charge of "propaganda in support of a terrorist organization." Since 2016 Altınel has been an active and vocal supporter both of the content of this petition and of the civil rights of its signers.

In the second hearing in his case, February 28, 2019, at the 29th Central Criminal Court, Çağlayan Courthouse, Istanbul, Altınel testified that he had aided civilian victims of military operations that took place in the towns placed under military curfew:

Since September 2015, I have traveled several times to a number of provinces, including some of those mentioned in the Peace Petition which I signed. ... I carried bag upon bag of provisions to help the victims of destruction and forced migration, I spoke with those who had lost their homes and relatives. I did all of this on my own initiative, and my principle was as follows: If every Turkish citizen will do what I do, we will come closer to peace. You can find the traces of my efforts where I sojourned in the towns of Sur, Nusaybin, Cizre, Hakkari, and Yüksekova. The Prosecutor may use this as evidence against me. ... I did not simply sign the Peace Petition. I thought about it, felt it, lived it. I wrote that text. I stand behind every sentence.

The sentencing hearing for Altınel's trial for "propaganda on behalf of a terrorist organization" in the context of the Academics for Peace Trials is scheduled for July 16, 2019.

=== 2019 charge and imprisonment ===
On April 12, 2019, on arriving for a visit to Turkey, Altınel's passport was confiscated at the airport. On May 10 he requested a new passport at the Balıkesir prefecture and was taken into custody for interrogation and placed in pre-trial detention on the following day. It was learned later that a new charge had been filed against him on April 30, 2019, at the prosecutor general's office in Balıkesir.

This new charge is "membership in a terrorist organization", based on his participation on February 21, 2019, at a public meeting in Villeurbanne, near Lyon, France. This meeting was organized by the local Kurdish Society; a documentary was shown on the subject of the Cizre massacres and a discussion was held with a former member of the Turkish parliament, Faysal Sarıyıldız (HDP), now in exile. (Note: Parliamentary deputy from the province of Şırnak from 2011 to 2017, in exile since 2016. After the resumption of the Turkish-Kurd conflict in summer 2015, and the December 2015 Cizre basement massacre, accused by Erdoğan of transporting firearms intended for terrorists in his car, a charge he has characterized as "an odious fabrication.". Honorary citizen of the town of Champigny-sur-Marne (94) and frequently called on to discuss the conflict with the Kurds in Turkey and the Cizre basement massacres.) At that public meeting, Altınel acted as translator for the former MP.

On May 8 Füsun Üstel was incarcerated and began serving a 15-month sentence for signing the peace petition of January 2016. Altınel was arrested on May 11. After his first hearing on the new charge was scheduled for July 30, 2019, he was released.

=== Reactions ===
==== Press reports ====
Altınel's May 11 arrest was widely reported in the press, notably in France and in Turkey.

Some early reports of the arrest in Turkey quoting variously from Altınel's lawyer or Academics for Peace put the case in the context of the Academics for Peace trials and the conference held in Lyon, France. Other reports originating with the İhlas News Agency and reported on Habertürk and elsewhere described the case as the capture of a wanted terrorist; one of these reports stated that an anti-terrorist operation captured five members of Gülen Movement and the Kurdistan Workers' Party (PKK), listing Altınel's arrest as the fifth.

The first article in France, in Mediapart, appeared that same day and was followed rapidly by articles in Le Progrès, Le Monde, 20 minutes, Lyon Capitale, Lyon Mag, Le Figaro Étudiant, Le Figaro, Le Canard enchaîné, Libération, and L’Humanité. Altınel was featured as L’Humanité's Man of the Day on May 16, 2019. Euronews TV reported on the case on May 30, 2019.

==== Official reactions ====
Less than weeks after the confiscation of Altınel's passport, on April 23, 2019, the French Applied Mathematics Society and the French Mathematical Society wrote jointly to President Macron of France.

On May 11, the day of Altınel's arrest, the Turkish Consul General in Lyon, Mehmet Özgür Çakar, stated "Tuna Altınel organized, and moderated, a meeting in Lyon consisting entirely of propaganda in favor of the PKK. ... It is possible that this had a negative effect on his situation." The consul also noted that the PKK remains classified a terrorist group by Ankara, the United States, and the European Union. The French Ministry of Europe and Foreign Affairs expressed its "disquiet" on May 13, 2019. A support committee formed at Lyon created a website to document the evolution of the affair, and on May 23 the committee launched a petition in favor of the liberation of Altınel, with over 6000 signatories as of June, 2019, predominantly academics, along with approximately 60 members of the French National Assembly.

Professional societies from a number of countries, including mathematics societies in the United States, France, Great Britain, Germany Austria, Italy, and Belgium, as well as the European Mathematical Society, the Association for Symbolic Logic, and the Committee of Concerned Scientists have issued statements in support of Altınel.

==== National Assembly, France ====
On June 11, 2019, the French mathematician and politician Cédric Villani (LREM), Member of Parliament for Essonne's fifth district and Fields medalist, who is a colleague and an outspoken supporter of Altınel, posed a question on the subject during a session of the National Assembly to the Minister for Europe and Foreign Affairs Jean-Yves Le Drian, who stated that the government was committed to doing "everything in its power" in favor of his liberation, notably on the occasion of his June 13 visit to Turkey to consult his counterpart there.

== See also ==
- Stable group,
- Presidency of Recep Tayyip Erdoğan, State of emergency and purges
- Censorship in Turkey: Article 301
- Kurdish–Turkish conflict (2015–present)
