= Paul Bieniasz =

British virologist whose main area of research is HIV/AIDS

- Born: January 2, 1968; Norfolk, UK
- Education: University of Bath, B.Sc. 1990; University of London, Ph.D. 1996
- Spouse: Theodora Hatziioannou
- Awards: Elizabeth Glaser Award, 2003; Eli Lilly and Company Research Award, 2010; K.T. Jeang Retrovirology Prize, 2015; Member of National Academy of Sciences, USA, 2024
- Scientific career
- Workplaces: Duke University; Aaron Diamond AIDS Research Center; Rockefeller University

Paul Darren Bieniasz is a British-American virologist whose main area of research is HIV/AIDS. He is currently a professor of retrovirology at the Rockefeller University. He received the 2015 KT Jeang Retrovirology Prize and the 2010 Eli Lilly and Company Research Award. Bieniasz has been a Howard Hughes Medical Institute investigator since 2008.

== Early life and education ==
Paul Bieniasz was born in Norfolk in 1968. His grandfather moved to England from Poland at the outbreak of the World War II. Bieniasz grew up in Lincolnshire where he attended The King's School, Grantham. In 1990, he graduated from the University of Bath with a B.Sc. in biochemistry. Later, he joined the laboratory of Myra McClure at St. Mary's Hospital Medical School, at the Imperial College London University of London. He completed his doctoral thesis in 1996 on foamy viruses entitled "Foamy viruses: Phylogeny, replication and exploitation for gene transfer."

== Career ==
In 1996, Paul Bieniasz joined Bryan Cullen's lab at Duke University as a postdoctoral associate. At Duke, Bieniasz studied several aspects of the HIV-1 life cycle, including the determinants of specificity in the viral envelope with the cellular receptor CCR5 and HIV-1 Tat interaction with host factors. Bieniasz started his own independent lab in 1999 at the Aaron Diamond AIDS Research Center and Rockefeller University in New York. Initially he worked on understanding how later steps of viral infection, such as assembly and budding, were inhibited in rodent cells. This interest in viral budding came to define Bieniasz's career. Bieniasz showed that the retroviral protein Gag assembles at the plasma membrane, recruiting the viral genome by hijacking a specialized cellular protein complex involved in membrane vesicle trafficking, the ESCRT complex. Together with his wife and colleague, Theodora Hatziioannou, they identified several host-specific factors that restrict replication of HIV-1 in macaques. Tetherin, a potent antiviral factor, was also discovered in his lab and shown to be counteracted by the HIV-1 accessory protein Vpu. Subsequently, another inhibitor of HIV-1 replication was discovered in his lab, Mx2, a cellular protein shown to inhibit post-entry steps of the HIV-1 infection. In recent years, Paul Bieniasz's group has focused on viral RNA interactions with cellular proteins; in particular, his group showed that APOBEC3G is recruited to virions by interaction with the viral RNA, and that CG-depletion of HIV-1 genomes is a mechanism to evade the antiviral, RNA-binding protein ZAP. Bieniasz acted as Chair of the NIH AIDS Molecular and Cellular Biology study section from 2004 to 2009 and served on the NCI Board of Scientific Counselors from 2010 to 2014.
