= Theodora Hatziioannou =

Greek-American virologist

- Born: Rhodes, Greece
- Education: University of Bristol, Imperial College, London, University Claude Bernard
- Known for: creating a primate model of HIV-1-induced AIDS
- Spouse: Paul Bieniasz
- Scientific career
- Fields: Virology
- Workplaces: The Rockefeller Institute

Theodora Hatziioannou (Greek: Θεοδώρα Χατζηιωάννου) is a Greek-American virologist. She known for her work discovering restriction factors that counteract HIV-AIDS and other primate lentiviruses, thus restricting them to specific species, and making it hard to study HIV-1 in animals. Her findings allowed her to develop the first HIV-1-based virus which is capable of recapitulating AIDS-like symptoms in a non-hominid (in this case pigtail macaques). She is a Research Associate Professor in the Laboratory of Retrovirology at The Rockefeller University in New York. She is a co-author of a textbook on virology, Principles of Virology.

== Early life and education ==
Theodora Hatziioannou was born and raised in Rhodes, Greece. She studied biochemistry at the University of Bristol in Britain and then got a Master's degree in biotechnology from Imperial College London. She worked as a research technician with Robin Weiss at the Institute of Cancer Research, where she says she fell in love with research and determined she wanted to go on to earn a PhD. She therefore moved to Lyon-France, where she earned a PhD from the University Claude Bernard in 1999. Her PhD research, carried out under François-Loïc Cosset, involved looking at adapting retroviruses to use as tools for gene therapy, seeking to expand their tropism and target them to specific cells by manipulating the retroviral envelope.

== Career ==
After earning her PhD, Hatziioannou moved to the United States, where she joined the lab of Stephen Goff at Columbia University as a postdoctoral fellow. She then did further postdoctoral research with Paul Bieniasz at the Rockefeller University and the Aaron Diamond Research Center for AIDS. She became an assistant professor at Rockefeller University in 2006 and was promoted to associate professor in 2012.

== Research ==
=== HIV/AIDS ===
Animals have innate immune mechanisms to block viruses, termed restriction factors. Viruses can evolve to evade these restriction factors but, since this evolution occurs in the host species, the virus is often still vulnerable to restriction factors in other species, limiting their tropism. This has made it difficult to study HIV-1/AIDS in animal models and much of Hatziioannou's work involves identifying and overcoming restriction factors for HIV-1 and other lentiviruses. In 2006, Hatziioannou showed that if you swap two HIV-1 genes the viral capsid (which is targeted by a restriction factor called TRIM5) and Vif (which counteracts the restriction factor APOBEC) with versions from a related Simian Immunodeficiency Virus (SIV) that had been adapted to evade the rhesus macaque (a monkey) versions of their corresponding restriction factors, this simian tropic HIV (stHIV) could infect rhesus macaque cells. In 2009, she demonstrated that swapping out just the Vif gene allowed HIV-1 to infect pigtail macaque monkeys, whose TRIM5 they (and others) had found didn't bind to the HIV-1 capsid. This modified virus still contained 96% of the HIV-1 genome, making it a major advance over SIV models, however it did not cause illness in the monkeys . In order to develop a model recapitulating human AIDS, they temporarily depleted the immune systems of pigtail macaques and then serially passaged the virus through these monkeys, allowing it to adapt to better grow in pigtail macaques. After multiple passages (using virus grown in one monkey to infect another), the virus gained strength to the point that the monkeys showed classical signs of AIDS including depleted CD4+ T-cells (the type of immune cell lost in AIDS). This was the first time scientists had been able to cause AIDS in primates, and provides a more relevant animal model for research than any previously available.

=== SARS-CoV-2/COVID-19 ===
In early 2020, Hatziioannou became involved in research on SARS-CoV-2 and COVID-19. In a collaboration with Paul Bieniasz, she developed pseudovirus assays that use a harmless virus modified to express the SARS-CoV-2 Spike protein and a fluorescent reporter - she could then test for the presence of neutralizing antibodies (antibodies capable of blocking infection) by looking at the ability of these pseudoviruses to infect cells in a dish (and thus make them glow) in the presence of blood plasma taken from convalescent patients. These pseudoviruses could be worked with at a lower biosafety level than SARS-CoV-2, making it easier for researchers to study and measure neutralizing antibodies.

== Personal life ==
Hatziioannou is married to the virologist Paul Bieniasz, with whom she frequently collaborates. The couple have two children.

== Key publications ==
- Hatziioannou, Theodora; Princiotta, Michael; Piatak, Michael; Yuan, Fang; Zhang, Fengwen; Lifson, Jeffrey D.; Bieniasz, Paul D. (2006-10-06). "Generation of simian-tropic HIV-1 by restriction factor evasion". Science. 314 (5796): 95. doi:10.1126/science.1130994. ISSN 1095-9203. PMID 17023652. S2CID 36851132.
- Hatziioannou, Theodora; Del Prete, Gregory Q.; Keele, Brandon F.; Estes, Jacob D.; McNatt, Matthew W.; Bitzegeio, Julia; Raymond, Alice; Rodriguez, Anthony; Schmidt, Fabian; Mac Trubey, C.; Smedley, Jeremy (2014-06-20). "HIV-1-induced AIDS in monkeys". Science. 344 (6190): 1401–1405. Bibcode:2014Sci...344.1401H. doi:10.1126/science.1250761. ISSN 1095-9203. PMC 4266393. PMID 24948736.
- Hatziioannou, Theodora; Ambrose, Zandrea; Chung, Nancy P. Y.; Piatak, Michael; Yuan, Fang; Trubey, Charles M.; Coalter, Vicky; Kiser, Rebecca; Schneider, Doug; Smedley, Jeremy; Pung, Rhonda (2009-03-17). "A macaque model of HIV-1 infection". Proceedings of the National Academy of Sciences. 106 (11): 4425–4429. Bibcode:2009PNAS..106.4425H. doi:10.1073/pnas.0812587106. ISSN 0027-8424. PMC 2657417. PMID 19255423.
