= Institut Henri Poincaré =

Mathematics research institute in France

Coordinates: 48°50′41″N 2°20′38″E

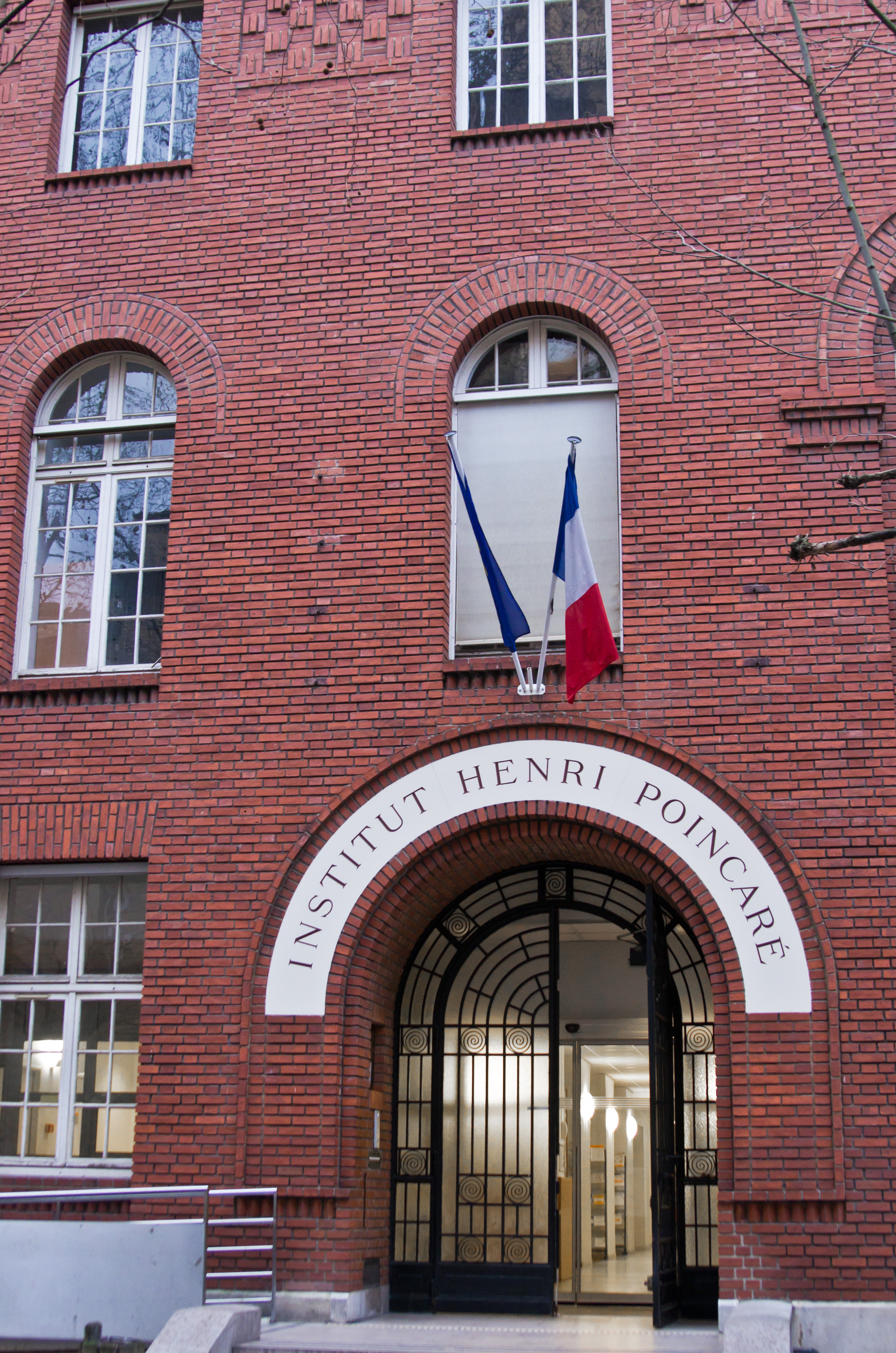

The Henri Poincaré Institute (or IHP for Institut Henri Poincaré) is a mathematics research institute part of Sorbonne University, in association with the Centre national de la recherche scientifique (CNRS). It is located in the 5th arrondissement of Paris, on the Sainte-Geneviève Hill.

== History ==
Just after World War I, mathematicians Émile Borel in France and George Birkhoff in the United States persuaded French and American sponsors (Edmond de Rothschild and the Rockefeller Foundation respectively) to fund the building of a centre for lectures and international exchanges in mathematics and theoretical physics. The Institute was inaugurated on 17 November 1928 and named after French mathematician Henri Poincaré (1854–1912).

The institute's objective has been to promote mathematical physics, and it soon became a meeting place for the French scientific community. In the 1990s, the IHP became a thematic institute modelled on Berkeley's Mathematical Sciences Research Institute (MSRI).

== Organization ==
The IHP's governing board has about 35 members. There are no permanent researchers other than the director and the deputy director. From 2009 to 2017, the institute was headed by mathematician Cédric Villani, Fields Medals laureate in 2010, as director. French cosmologist Jean-Philippe Uzan was his deputy director. Since 2018, Sylvie Benzoni has been the institute's director.

Together with the Institut des Hautes Études Scientifiques (IHES), the Centre International de Rencontres Mathématiques (CIRM) and the Centre International de Mathématiques Pures et Appliquées (CIMPA) it is a member of the Carmin LabEx (Laboratory of Excellence), which aims at facilitating exchanges between mathematicians by building infrastructures for pooling skills and information.

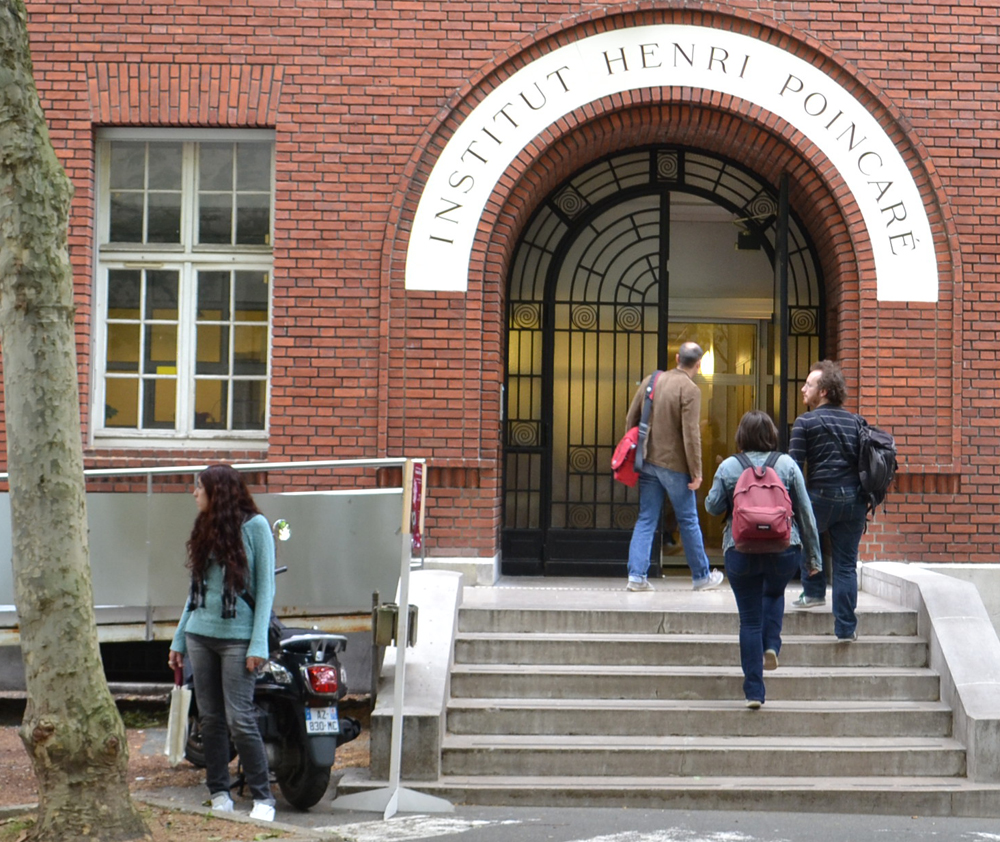
Main entrance of the Institute

== Scientific activities ==
As a venue for national and international mathematical exchanges, the Institute organizes "thematic quarters" (three-month programmes on specific topics), intensive short-time collaborations, PhD training courses, conferences and seminars in mathematics or related fields, such as physics, biology or computer science. Topics are selected by the IHP's Scientific Steering Committee. The IHP welcomes around 11,000 mathematicians each year.

In 2013, the Institute launched the "Poincaré Chair", a research program designed to foster the international careers of young researchers. Numerous seminars or series of lectures take place at the IHP, such as the Bourbaki and Bourbaphy Seminars, the History of Mathematics Seminar, as well as some more specialised lectures in algebra, number theory, mathematical physics and elliptic curves.

The institute also publishes four international scientific journals, the Annals of the Institut Henri Poincaré (Journal of Theoretical and Mathematical Physics, Probability and Statistics, Non-Linear Analysis, and Combinatorics, Physics and their Interactions).

== General public ==
The Institute co-organises and sponsors numerous, scientific and cultural events aimed at the general public (2011: Mathematics, a Beautiful Elsewhere at the Fondation Cartier; 2011: A tribute to Evariste Galois; 2012: Centenary of Henri Poincaré's Death...). It has close ties with the associations and societies for the promotion of mathematics housed in its premises.

== Mathematical designs ==
The library of the Henri Poincaré Institute holds a collection of some 400 mathematical models and designs that come in different materials: glass, plastic, cardboard, wire, sewing thread on a rigid frame, and plaster. This collection, which started with a donation by Martin Shilling, has been enhanced over the years, notably by wooden models built between 1912 and 1914 by lecturer Joseph Caron of the École Normale Supérieure.

== Head of Institut Henri Poincaré ==
- 1928–1948: Émile Borel
- 1949–1975: Paul Montel
- 1975–1984: Charles Pisot
- 1984–1985: Pierre Lelong
- 1986–1987: Bernard Teissier
- 1988–1989: Jacques Stern
- 1990–1994: Pierre Grisvard
- 1994–1995: Joseph Oesterlé
- 1999–2008: Michel Broué
- 2009–2017: Cédric Villani
- 2018–present: Sylvie Benzoni

== See also ==
- Annales Henri Poincaré
- Henri Poincaré
- Émile Borel
