= Patrick Froehlich =

French novelist

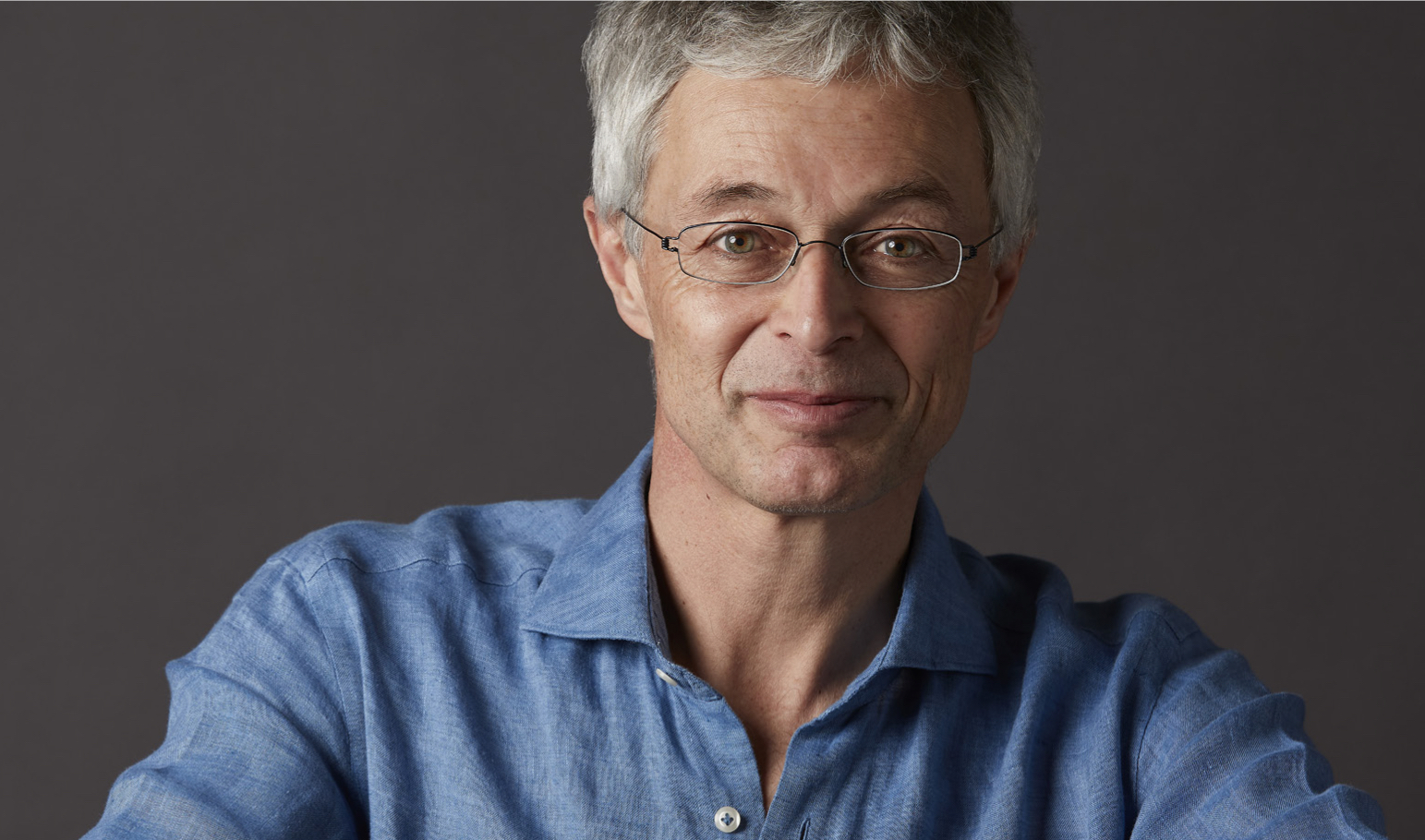
- Froehlich in 2018
- Born: 5 August 1961 (age 65); Dijon, France
- Citizenship: French and Canadian
- Education: MD, PhD, Claude Bernard University Lyon 1
- Occupations: Writer and Medical Doctor
- Writing career
- Language: French and English
- Genre: Fiction
- Website: patrickafroehlich.com

Patrick Froehlich (born 5 August 1961) is a French writer and physician. For several decades, he practiced surgery and has published seven novels. His main subjects are children's pain, the struggle against disease and the trauma resulting from situations on the edge of life. He contributed to the development of image-guided mini invasive surgery.

== Biography ==
Froehlich lived in Lyon, Brussels, and later settled in Montreal. He is the author of seven novels. He began by publishing numerous scientific articles and works in the area of airway pediatric surgery. He contributed to the development of imagery-guided, minimally-invasive surgery.

He practiced medicine at the CHU in Lyon as a university professor and attending physician until 2017 and, from 2009 to 2014, as a Full Professor attached to the University of Montreal.

He has written the trilogy Corps étrangers (Foreign bodies) for Les Allusifs publishing house (Montreal). These are fictions that spring from real situations: the pain that children suffer, the fight against sickness, the effects of situations encountered by surgeons at life's far extremes.

The novel Avant tout ne pas nuire (First, Do No Harm) ( Primum non noccere) a work halfway between fiction and documentary, is, according to the leading French newspaper Le Monde, an exercise in introspection undertaken by Froehlich in relation to the theme of pain, the pain he feels as well as that inflicted upon the child in the course of surgery. He explains that his own awareness was long in coming, and reminds us that the newborn's ability to experience pain was not recognized until 1987. The novel begins with his daughter asking this question: "Have you ever hurt a child? Tell me you never hurt a child you were taking care of." Patrick Froehlich answered No, though "poorly articulated, scarcely audible," and he points out that "this inability to assert the contrary" concealed "a sense of shame" that he was forced to confront.

In the novel Ce côté et l’autre de l’océan (Both Sides of the Ocean), again, we read in Le Monde, the author ponders the question of pattern repetition. He suffered from his parents continually moving when he was young, and wonders if he hasn't reproduced the same pattern with his own children by taking on different positions in Belgium and Canada. Le Monde writes, "We follow him, recovering hidden memory, rediscovering the city of Poughkeepsie, in the Hudson Valley, where his father worked for IBM, attracted by the myth of America and the great computer utopia of the 1970s. Gazing into the mirror streaked with parental and personal fears, the writer is less interested in the revelation, and more interested in stripping away and moving beyond."

In the novel "La minute bleue" he explores the traumatic memory of the surgeon and on the other hand the family silences over the wars its family members went through.

He talks about his writing process and what he learned from composing these two novels on his site. "As a result of the conflicts that shook the generations that came before me (the Franco-Prussian War of 1870, World War I and II, the Algerian War), I began to write about my own war against sickness. First by considering pain in Avant tout ne pas nuire, then through my father and the Algerian colonial war in Ce côté et l’autre de l’océan. This book led me to take on the surgeon’s traumatic memory in a more direct manner, facing the fact of writing in a more unexpected way. The two works are independent, they stand on their own, though they do open onto each other. I end each work by discovering what the next one will be, where my writing will go next. Writing begins with inner tension. The fear of the subject, and the shame associated with it are excellent motivators. The story begins with my reality, but it is much richer and more complex than my imagination."

== Bibliography ==
=== Books ===
==== Novels ====
- To love, love, love (roman), Montréal, Groupe Nota Bene, Éditions Varia, collection L'aire de jeu, 2023.
- La minute bleue (A blue moment), Corps étrangers - III (Foreign bodies - III), Montreal: Les Allusifs, 2020.
- Ce côté et l'autre de l'océan (Both Sides of the Ocean), Corps étrangers - II (Foreign Bodies - II), Montreal: Les Allusifs, 2018.
- Avant tout ne pas nuire (First, Do not Harm), Corps étrangers - I (Foreign Bodies - I), Montreal: Les Allusifs, 2017.
- L'Enfant secoué (The shaken child), Paris: Publie.net, 2018 [2011].
- La Voix de Paola (Paola's Voice), Paris: Publie.net, 2018 [2009].
- Le Toison, Paris: Le Seuil, Fiction & Cie, 2006.

==== Tales ====
- Rien de beau sur la guerre, Maï Nguyen et Patrick Froehlich, Éditions du Passage 2022.
- Annie Ernaux, collection Duetto, éditions Nouvelles Lectures, 2020.

==== Medical Books ====
- Les Infections ORL de l'enfant (Infections in Otolaryngology), Paris: Larousse Guides santé, 2005.

=== Articles (selection) ===
- Gilles Roger, MD, Patrice Tran Ba Huy, MD, Patrick Froehlich, MD, PhD, et al., "Exclusively Endoscopic Removal of Juvenile Nasopharyngeal Angiofibroma Trends and Limits", Arch Otolaryngol Head Neck Surg. 2002;128(8):928-935.
- Ana Nusa Naiman MD, Philippe Ceruse MD, Bruno Coulombeau MD, Patrick Froehlich MD, "Intralesional Cidofovir and Surgical Excision for Laryngeal Papillomatosis", The Laryngoscope, 2003 Dec;113(12): 2174-81.
- Carine Fuchsmann, MD; Marie-Claude Quintal, MD; Chantal Giguere, MD; Sonia Ayari-Khalfallah, MD; Laurent Guibaud, MD, PhD; Julie Powell, MD; Catherine McCone, MD; Patrick Froehlich, MD, PhD, "Propranolol as First-line Treatment of Head and Neck Hemangiomas", Arch Otolaryngol Head Neck Surg. 2011;137(5):471-478.
