= Uwe Rau =

German physicist

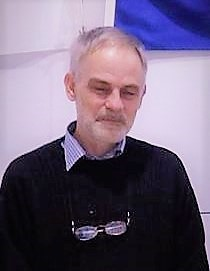
Rau in Tokyo, March 2016

Uwe Rau is a German physicist who made important contributions to the physics of the photovoltaic device, notably on explaining energy losses in thin-film solar cells and on the use of the reciprocity principle to characterize solar cells by electroluminescence techniques. This led to the development of this technique as a standard in research and industry.

== Career ==
Rau studied physics at the University of Tübingen, Germany and the Université Claude Bernard, Lyon. Both his diploma thesis (1987) and his doctoral thesis (1991) were obtained for work performed in the group of Huebener, at the University of Tübingen, on the breakdown of Germanium under high magnetic fields, and for non-linear charge transport in semiconductors. He worked at the Max Planck Institute for Solid State Research in Stuttgart, where he worked on crystalline silicon solar cells. In 1995, he moved to Bayreuth where he predominantly worked on the device physics of Cu(In,Ga)Se_{2} solar cells. In 1997, he moved back to Stuttgart to work at the University of Stuttgart, Institute of Physical Electronics, which was led by Jürgen Werner. In Stuttgart, he continued his work on Si and Cu(In,Ga)Se_{2}, and started work on dye-sensitized solar cells, organic solar cells, and the fundamental aspects of luminescence in solar cells. In 2002, he obtained his habilitation from the University of Oldenburg, Germany, for his work on the electrical transport properties of semiconductors and interfaces for photovoltaics. Since 2007, Rau is a full professor at RWTH Aachen and Director of the Institute for Energy and Climate Research at the Forschungszentrum Jülich. Since 2011, he is also the scientific director of the HITEC graduate school at the Forschungszentrum Jülich. Currently, he is the director of the JARA-Energy, (JARA = Jülich-Aachen Research Alliance) which coordinates research at Forschungszentrum Jülich and RWTH Aachen in the field of renewable energy.

== Achievements ==
Rau is well known for his various contributions to the basic principles of photovoltaic energy conversion and to improving the understanding of solar cell device physics. Most notable, perhaps, is his publication in 2007 of a paper on a "reciprocity relation between photovoltaic quantum efficiency and electroluminescent emission of solar cells". This work uses the principle of detailed balance to derive basic relationships between the photovoltaic and the light-emitting mode of a semiconductor diode. This work had substantial influence on the field of characterizing solar cells or modules using luminescence-based techniques. In addition, it has provided a framework for analyzing voltage losses at the open circuit in solar cells. Uwe Rau also contributed towards the analysis of thin film solar cells, with seminal papers on the ideality factor, on metastability of the electronic conduction in Cu(In,Ga)Se_{2}, on photovoltaic device stability and self-healing, and on the passivation of grain boundaries in polycrystalline thin film solar cells. He also contributed to several important papers to understand the conversion efficiency limitations of solar cells, among which the role of disorder and potential fluctuations, and on the impact of light trapping on the Voc of solar cells.
