= Raphaèle Herbin =

French mathematician

Raphaèle Herbin is a French applied mathematician; she is known for her work on the finite volume method.

Herbin has been a professor at Aix-Marseille University since 1995, and directed the Institut de Mathématiques de Marseille. She earned her doctorate in 1986 at Claude Bernard University Lyon 1, with the dissertation Approximation numérique d'inéquations variationnelles non linéaires par des méthodes de continuation supervised by Francis Conrad.

Herbin is a co-author of the books Mesure, intégration, probabilités (Ellipses, 2013) and The gradient discretisation method (Springer, 2018).

In 2017 the CNRS gave Herbin their CNRS medal of innovation.
