= University of Mahajanga =

- Université de Mahajanga
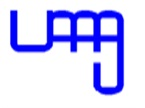
- Logo of UMG
- Motto: "University for All and Engine of Development"
- Type: Public university
- Established: 1983; 42 years ago
- President: Interim Committee - Jeanne Angelphine Rasoamananjara
- Academic staff: 166
- Administrative staff: 596
- Students: 9593
- Location: Mahajanga, Boeny, Madagascar; 15°42′05″S 46°21′14″E
- Campus: Ambondrona
- Language: French
- Affiliations: Agence universitaire de la Francophonie
- Website: univ-mahajanga.edu.mg

The University of Mahajanga (also known as Université de Majunga) is a public higher education institution located in Mahajanga, a port city on the northwest coast of Madagascar.

== History ==
=== Establishment and development ===
Established in 1977, the School of Dental Surgery (ESCD) was the first Regional University Center in the Province of Mahajanga. The fields of medicine and natural sciences were introduced in 1982 and together formed the University of Mahajanga in 1983.

The first rector of the University of Mahajanga was George Raoelina (1979–1990). The current president is Professor Blanchard Randrianambinina.

== Organization ==
=== Academic programs and research ===
As part of the nationwide implementation of the LMD reform, the academic programs at the University of Mahajanga have been accredited by the Ministry of Higher Education. The accredited programs are divided into three domains, which are further divided into degrees and specializations:

- School of Dental Surgery (ESCD)
- University Institute of Management (IUGM)
- School of Arts and Techniques in Dental Prosthesis (EATP)

== Institutions and schools ==
The University of Mahajanga is composed of two faculties:

- Faculty of Medicine
- Faculty of Sciences, Technologies, and Environment (FSTE)

=== Institutes ===
As of 2010, the University of Mahajanga has at least four institutes and four fee-based schools offering around forty courses in various fields:

- University Institute of Management (IUGM)
- University Institute of Technology and Agronomy of Mahajanga (IUTAM, specializing in natural sciences and professional training in agriculture and livestock)
- Higher Institute of Science and Technology (ISSTM)
- Institute of Tropical Odontostomatology of Madagascar

=== Schools ===
- School of Law and Political Science (EDSP)
- School of Tourism (ET)
- Institute of Language and Civilization (ILC)
- School of International Commercial Languages (ELCI)

== Documentation center ==
The University of Mahajanga has a documentation center with over 12,000 books. Recently, through the Agence universitaire de la Francophonie, the university received a partner Francophone Digital Campus, which offers a documentation and digital document search service.

== See also ==
- List of universities in Madagascar
- Education in Madagascar
