= Yvon Morandat =

French Resistance hero and politician (1913–1972)

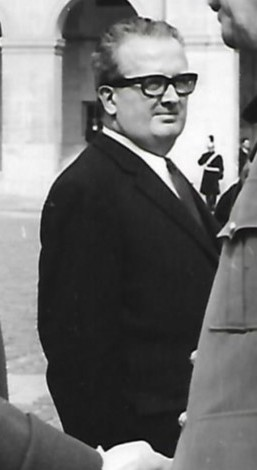
Yvon Morandat

Marie Léon Ivan "Yvon" Morandat (French pronunciation: [ivɔ̃ mɔʁɑ̃da]; aliases "Léo", "Mareuil" and "Arnolphe"; 25 December 1913 – 8 December 1972) was a French trade union leader and member of the French Resistance as an SOE RF Section/BCRA operative, who after World War II became active as a Gaullist politician.

== Biography ==
Morandat was born into a family of small farmers in Buellas, Ain. After gaining his end of primary school certificate, he became a farmhand and was an activist for Jeunesse agricole catholique. He left the farm to become a shop assistant in a hardware store in Buellas and then a salesman in a department store in Chambéry, and remained an active trade unionist. In 1937, he became the general secretary of the Syndicats Chrétiens de la Savoie (Christian unions of Savoy).

At the outbreak of World War II in 1939, he was in a Chasseurs Alpins unit and volunteered for a Norwegian expedition in Narvik in the spring of 1940. On his return from Narvik that year, he took part in fighting in Brittany before being evacuated to England on 18 June, just before the armistice with the Nazis. In the Free France forces, he was attached to Charles de Gaulle's office. Rejecting de Gaulle's offer to broadcast on radio, he stated he wished to continue fighting and accepted de Gaulle's alternative request to leave for France and make contact with the new resistance organizations.

After training in Scotland, he was parachuted into the Massif Central near Toulouse on 6 November 1941. He contacted local Confédération générale du travail and Confédération française des travailleurs chrétiens trade unionists and then in Marseille, Clermont-Ferrand, Montluçon and Lyon, preparing the ground for the resistance leader Jean Moulin, whom he met in January 1942, in Valence. He continued facilitating union and political links. He took part in the launch of the Libération movement and the Mouvement Ouvrier Français (French workers' movement) with Robert Lacoste and others; he also helped the Comité d'action socialiste to print the underground newspaper Le Populaire. As a member of the Libération steering committee, he identified parachuting grounds, had the idea of Le Bureau d'Information et de Presse (BIP) which was then instigated by Jean Moulin, and continued creating resistance network links before being recalled to London in November 1942, after being sentenced to death in absentia. In this work, he was fully supported by his wife, Claire. He worked with André Philip and then enlisted in the Free French Air Forces in May 1943, serving as a lieutenant in the 1er Bataillon d'infanterie de l'Air before being appointed as the youngest member of the Provisional Consultative Assembly of Algiers. He asked to return to France and on 29 January 1944, under the pseudonym of "Arnolphe", parachuted into Drôme. Continuing his previous liaisons, he became an assistant to Alexandre Parodi, the general delegate of the GPRF for the Resistance and French Committee of National Liberation, preparing with him the administrative measures to be put in place after the Allied landing. During the Liberation of Paris, Morandat arrived on a bicycle with his wife at the Hôtel de Matignon and claimed it on behalf of the Provisional Government of France.

He founded l'Agence Européenne de Presse in 1944, which he managed until 1947. He was a founding member of the Gaullist Rassemblement du Peuple Français and was active in the Union démocratique du travail, later in the Front Travailliste. In 1947, he joined the Charbonnages de France (French coal board) as executive attaché and became head of the press service. In 1959, he was chairman of the board of directors of coal mines in Provence and in 1963 had the same role in Nord-Pas-de-Calais. From May to July 1968, he was Secretary of State for Social Affairs in the Pompidou government. In 1969, he became chairman of the board of directors of Charbonnages de France. He became a member of the United Nations Economic and Social Council and of the Cours des Comptes. He chaired the SOS Villages d'enfants – the French branch of the international humanitarian organisation – and the Maison Internationale des Jeunes (International House of Youth).

Yvon Morandat died in Marseille on 8 December 1972. He was buried in Ventabren in Bouches-du-Rhône.

== Awards and legacy ==
He became a companion of the Order of Liberation in July 1945. He also received the Croix de Guerre, Légion d'Honneur, Ordre national du Mérite, Médaille de la Résistance and the Croix de guerre (Belgium). He became an Officer of the Order of the British Empire and an Officer of the Order of Leopold (Belgium).

Place Yvon Et Claire Morandat lies in Paris in the 17th arrondissement. The Collège Yvon Morandat is in Saint-Denis-lès-Bourg. A former coal mine and current geothermal heating project in Gardanne is named after Morandat.

Morandat was played by Jean-Paul Belmondo in the 1968 French-US film about the liberation of Paris, Is Paris Burning?, directed by René Clément. Claire Morandat was played by Marie Versini.

After the anti-Semitic writer, Louis-Ferdinand Céline, hurriedly fled his Paris flat upon the liberation of France, Morandat moved into the flat and lived there for several years. Accusations were made by Céline of Morandat and the latter offered to return property upon Céline's return to France. He refused. Recently, missing manuscripts of Céline have appeared, provided by an anonymous source to the journalist Jean-Pierre Thubaudat who revealed the manuscripts upon the death of Céline's widow, Lucette Destouches, in 2019. Amongst others, there has been speculation that Morandat might have been in possession of the manuscripts.
