= Hospices Civils de Lyon =

Hospices civils de Lyon

Geography
- Location: 3 Quai des Célestins, 69002, Lyon (Siège), Rhône-Alpes, France
- Coordinates: 45.7609°N 4.8315°E

Organisation
- Type: Teaching hospital
- Affiliated university: Claude Bernard University Lyon 1

Services
- Emergency department: yes
- Beds: 5362

History
- Founded: January 18, 1802

Links
- Website: www.chu-lyon.fr
- Lists: Hospitals in France

The Université Hospital of Lyon (French: Hospices Civils de Lyon, HCL) was created on January 18, 1802. It is the second Teaching hospital in France. It has 13 hospitals in the Lyon area and one in the south of France.

University hospital in Lyon, France
