= Jean-Pierre Lévy =

French lawyer, author and diplomat

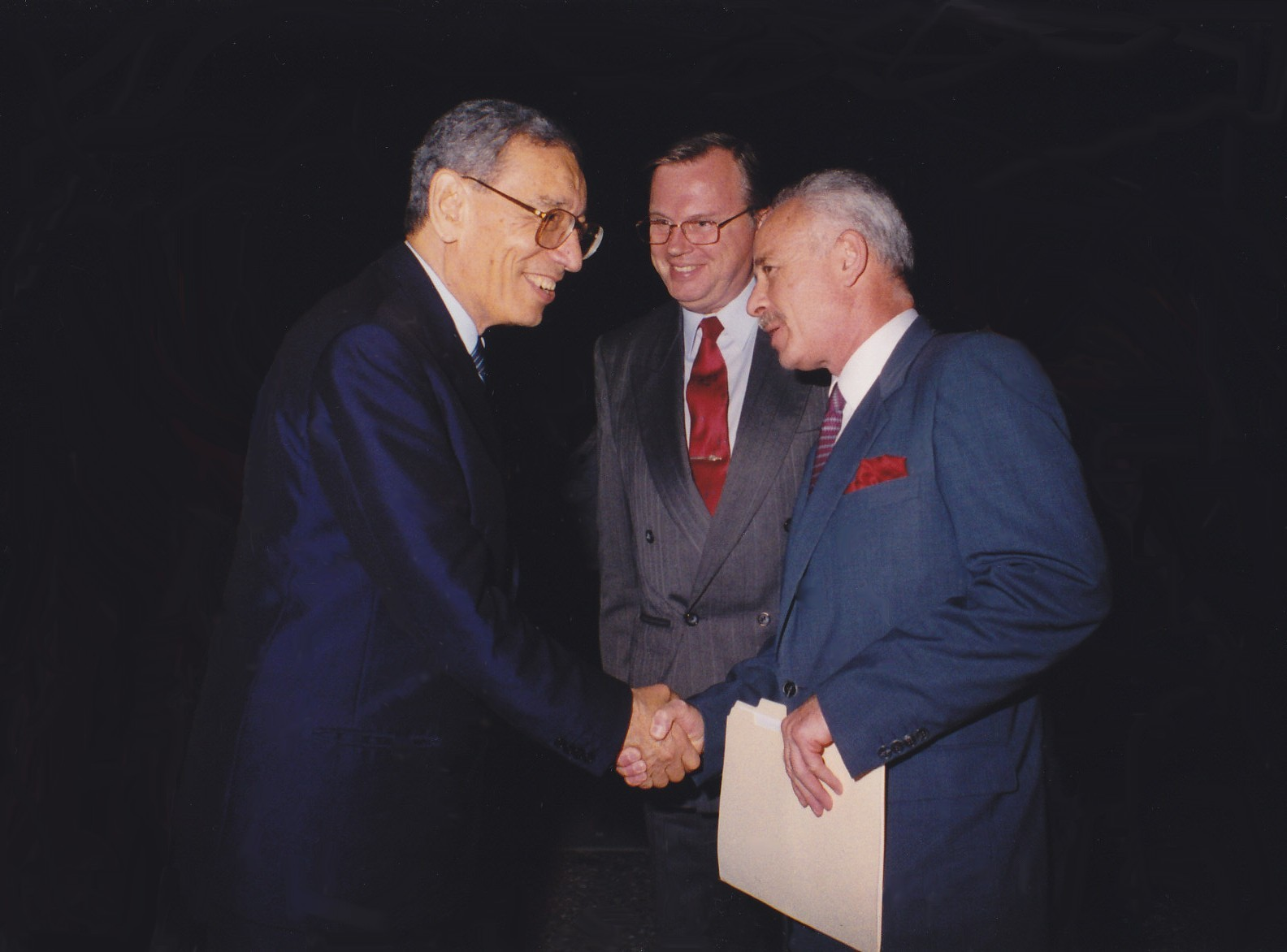
Jean-Pierre Lévy (right) with UN Secretary-General Boutros Boutros-Ghali and Hans Corel in 1994.

Jean-Pierre Lévy (French pronunciation: [ʒɑ̃ pjɛʁ levi]; born 1935) is a French lawyer, author and diplomat. He was the director of the United Nations Division for Ocean Affairs and the Law of the Sea in 1985.

== Biography ==
Born in Mulhouse (France), he studied political science and law at the University of Strasbourg, where he graduated from the Institut d'études politiques and earned a PhD degree in International Law in 1960.

Following graduation, he worked as a legal and financial advisor before joining the United Nations in New York in 1966. There, he specialized in matters relating to the Law of the Sea and, in various capacities, participated in all the negotiations relating to the establishment of a new Law of the Sea (Committee on the peaceful use of the seabed and the ocean floor beyond the limits of national jurisdiction, Third United Nations Conference on the Law of the Sea, Preparatory Commission for the International Seabed Authority and the International Tribunal on the Law of the Sea, Implementation Agreement of 24 July 1994).

In 1996 Jean-Pierre Lévy assisted President Mário Soares of Portugal as Executive Secretary of the Independent World Commission on the Oceans (The Soares Commission) which presented its final report The Ocean, Our Future at the World Exposition on the Ocean held in Lisbon in 1998. He was also attached to the Legal Office of the French Ministry of Foreign Affairs as an expert in the Law of the Sea and was elected to the Finance Committee of the International Seabed Authority in Kingston, Jamaica.

He has authored and co-authored more than fifty books and publications dedicated to the Law of the Sea and Ocean Affairs, including La Conference des Nations Unies sur le Droit de la Mer (Pedone, 1983), The UN Conference on Straddling Fish Stocks and Highly Migratory Fish Stocks as editor with Gunnar Schramm (Martinus Nijhoff, 1996) and Le Destin de l'Autorite Internationale des Fonds Marins (Pedone, 2002).

Currently, Jean-Pierre Lévy is a member of the Finance Committee of the International Seabed Authority, which is the organization through which 159 State Parties and the European Union administer the resources of the seabed and ocean floor beyond the limits of national jurisdiction.

== See also ==
- United Nations Convention on the Law of the Sea
- International Seabed Authority
