= European Hematology Association =

Professional organisation

The European Hematology Association (EHA) is a non-governmental and not-for-profit membership organization that is guided by its mission to promote excellence in patient care, research, and education in hematology.

== History ==
The European Hematology Association (EHA) was officially established in 1992. EHA is a global platform for excellence in hematology, focusing on blood, blood cells, and blood disorders such as leukemia, lymphoma, hemophilia, anemia and thrombosis.

== Activities ==
- Connecting hematologists worldwide: EHA is the largest Europe-based organization that brings together medical professionals, researchers and scientists with an active interest in hematology. EHA holds an annual congress to facilitate that mission.
- Supporting career development and research to accelerate the careers of junior scientists: EHA provides research grants and mentoring and training programs for basic, translational, and clinical researchers in the field of malignant and non-malignant hematology.
- Harmonizing hematology education: EHA is an independent provider of hematology education, with a comprehensive and integral curriculum that forms the basis of EHA Medical Education Program. Through this program, professionals acquire knowledge by various means, such as an online learning platform, educational meetings and a European Hematology Exam.
- Advocating the interests of hematologists and hematology: EHA represents hematology and hematologists in the European political and policy arena to achieve research funding opportunities, improve regulation, increase the availability and affordability of medicines, and harmonize education and training of hematologists.

== Publication ==
HemaSphere (ISSN 2572-9241) is the official open access journal of the European Hematology Association. The journal publishes basic, translational and clinical research as well as review articles with recommendations for future research and clinical applications.
