= André Cerdini =

French magistrate (1929–2026)

- Born: André Émile Cerdini; 18 December 1929; Vals-les-Bains, France
- Died: 4 May 2026 (aged 96); Vals-les-Bains, France
- Education: Catholic University of Lyon
- Occupation: Magistrate

André Émile Cerdini (French: [ɑ̃dʁˈe emˈil sɛʁdinˈi]; 18 December 1929 – 4 May 2026) was a French magistrate. He was best-known for overseeing the trial of Klaus Barbie.

== Life and career ==
Born in Vals-les-Bains on 18 December 1929, Cerdini was the son of Angiolo Cerdini, an Italian immigrant. He studied law at the Catholic University of Lyon. For several years, he was posted in Ivory Coast before returning to France and working in Normandy, Puy, and Lyon. He became chief magistrate of the Cour d'assises of Rhône at the Palais de justice historique de Lyon in 1984. In 1980, he was appointed a member of the disciplinary commission of the public prosecutor's office. From 11 May to 3 June 1987, he presided over the trial of Klaus Barbie, a Nazi German officer. Barbie was sentenced to life imprisonment for crimes against humanity in a trial that had a worldwide impact.

Cerdini died in Vals-les-Bains on 4 May 2026, at the age of 96.
