= Monika Ertl =

German-Bolivian communist militant and guerrilla fighter (1937–1973)

- Born: 17 August 1937; Munich, Germany
- Died: 12 May 1973 (aged 35); El Alto, La Paz, Bolivia
- Cause of death: Killed by Bolivian security services
- Known for: Murdering Toto Quintanilla

Monika Ertl (17 August 1937 – 12 May 1973) was a German-Bolivian communist militant and guerrilla fighter and the daughter of Nazi propagandist Hans Ertl. She is most known for executing Colonel Roberto Quintanilla Pereira, the man responsible for chopping off Che Guevara's hands. This successful execution earned her the title 'Che Guevara's avenger' in Germany. She continued to serve as a soldier in the National Liberation Army (ELN), resisting the Bolivian government, until she was killed by Bolivian security services in 1973. Her body was never returned to her family, and the site of her grave remains unknown.

== Biography ==
Ertl was born in Munich. After World War II her father emigrated to Bolivia, where he continued to film for some time and became a farmer.

Monika Ertl came to Bolivia in 1952 when her father brought the family over from Germany. Her father established a new life on the farm La Dolorida where he bred livestock. In Bolivia, she accompanied her father on several filming expeditions and learnt to use both a film camera and firearms. Later, she entered a marriage briefly, but felt unhappy playing the "trophy wife" of a Bolivian-German mining engineer. After her divorce in 1969, she became involved with the survivors of Che Guevara's routed guerrilla movement, the National Liberation Army of Bolivia (ELN). After helping out in minor occasions she finally joined the political underground. She began a relationship with the ELN leader Inti Peredo, the successor of Che Guevara. Peredo was killed by Bolivian Police forces in a shootout in La Paz on 9 September 1969. In Germany, she became known as "Che Guevara's avenger" because of her involvement in the 1971 killing of Colonel Roberto Quintanilla Pereira in Hamburg, Germany: although this has never been completely proven, it is assumed that she shot Quintanilla who, at the time, was serving in Hamburg as the Bolivian consul. A message found at the execution scene read "Victory or Death", a slogan of the ELN. Former ELN leader Osvaldo "Chato" Peredo confirmed, in an interview filmed by German director Christian Baudissin in 1988, that Quintanilla was a prime target of the ELN because he had been responsible for ordering the hands of Guevara's corpse be cut off and sent to La Paz for further identification. He also states that Ertl, "after carrying out the mission in Hamburg", returned to Cuba where she met with Régis Debray.

After being under covert observation in Bolivia for several days, she and another guerrilla were eventually ambushed and killed by Bolivian security forces on 12 May 1973 in El Alto (in La Paz), where she was reorganizing the ELN. According to Régis Debray, she was also preparing the abduction of the former Gestapo Chief of Lyon Klaus Barbie to bring him to Chile and consequently to justice in France where he was wanted as a Nazi war criminal. Klaus Barbie was a long-time acquaintance of Monika’s family, to the point that she used to call him 'uncle'. At the time Barbie was known to be an adviser of the secret police in Bolivia. Her body was not turned over to her family to be buried and she rests in an unknown grave.

== In popular culture ==
- Ertl is among the prominent characters in a fictionalized account of her family, Los Afectos (Affections) by Bolivian author Rodrigo Hasbún.
- A documentary film made about her life, called Wanted: Monika Ertl was shown at the International Filmfestival of Berlin in 1989.
- Régis Debray's book La neige brûle is dedicated to Ertl.
- The song "Mozambique" by Amon Düül II is dedicated to Ertl.
