= Rue Sainte-Catherine =

Streets named the Rue Sainte-Catherine, French for Saint Catherine Street, are found in the following cities:

- Rue Sainte-Catherine (Bordeaux)
- Rue Sainte-Catherine (Lyon)
- Rue Sainte-Catherine (Montreal)
