= Roberto Quintanilla =

Bolivian intelligence officer (1928–1971)

Roberto Quintanilla Pereira
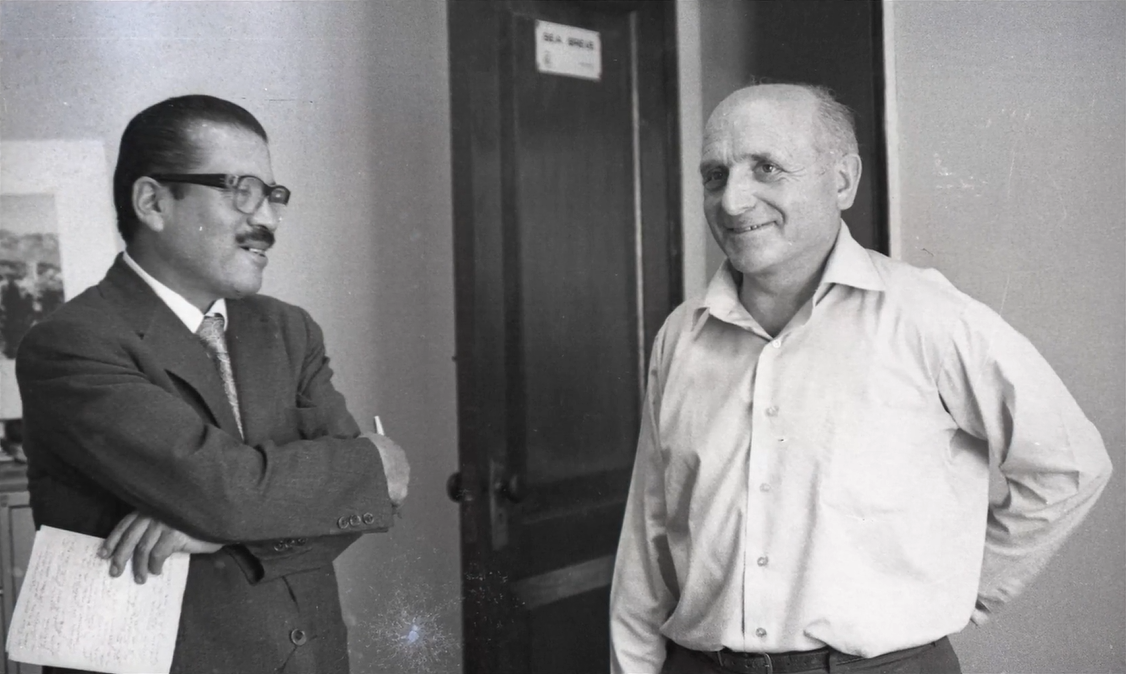
- Roberto Quintanilla (left) and Klaus Barbie, 1971

Head of intelligence in the Bolivian interior ministry
- President: René Barrientos

Personal details
- Born: 1928
- Died: 1 April 1971 (aged 42–43) Hamburg, West Germany
- Cause of death: Assassination

Lieutenant-Colonel Roberto Quintanilla Pereira (1928–1 April 1971) was a Bolivian intelligence officer. He was head of intelligence of the interior ministry of President René Barrientos, and in this role, he played a part in the 1967 capture and execution of Che Guevara. In 1969, Quintanilla was responsible for the torture and death of National Liberation Army of Bolivia (ELN) leader Guido "Inti" Peredo Leigue. Appointed as consul-general in Hamburg, he was allegedly assassinated by Monika Ertl in the consulate.

== Biography ==
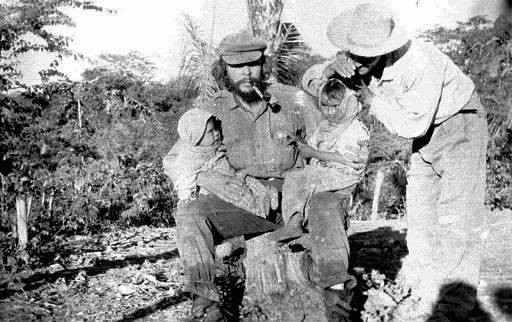
Guevara in Bolivia, 1967

Quintanilla was born in 1928. He rose to become head of intelligence in the interior ministry under Bolivian president René Barrientos. Nicknamed "Toto", he was linked to the American Central Intelligence Agency and studied at the US-run School of the Americas in Panama.

Quintanilla played a role in the operation leading to the 1967 capture and execution of Marxist guerrilla Che Guevara. He was responsible for ordering the removal of Guevara's hands for fingerprinting and the making of a death mask of his face in plaster. For his role in the operation, he was promoted to lieutenant-colonel. In 1969 he was responsible for the torture and execution of Ejército de Liberación Nacional de Bolivia ("National Liberation Army of Bolivia"; ELN) leader Inti Peredo. The same year contemporary media reports linked him with the death of President Barrientos in a suspicious helicopter crash.

== Assassination ==
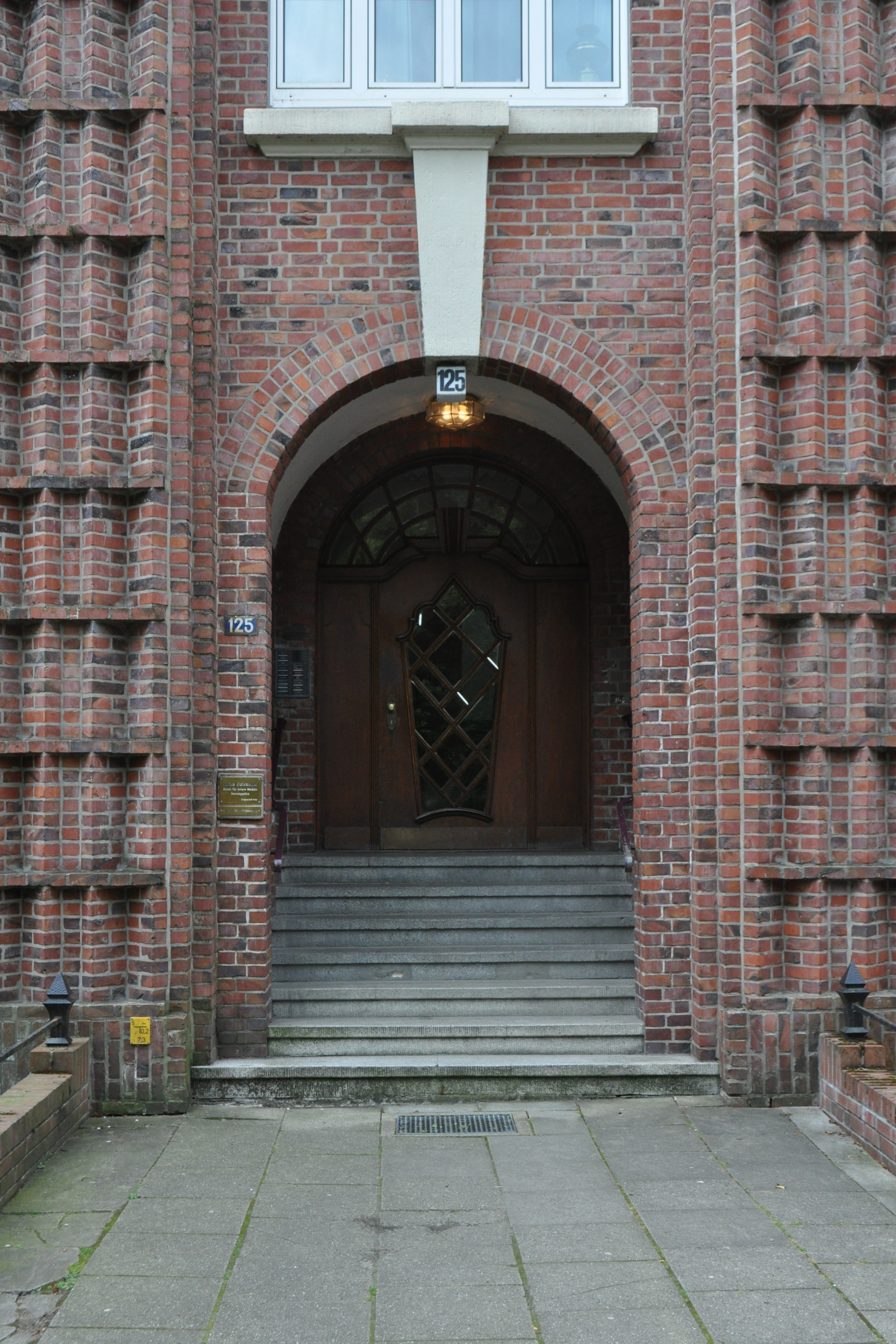
Entrance to 125 Heilwigstrasse

Quintanilla was later appointed Bolivia's consul-general in Hamburg, Germany. By April 1, 1971, he had completed his posting but remained at the consulate at 125 Heilwigstrasse to hand over the position to his successor, before returning to Bolivia. Later that day ELN operative Monika Ertl entered the consulate, posing as an Australian folklorist seeking a visa to travel to Bolivia. Quintanilla admitted Ertl to his office and had sent his translator to fetch some tourist brochures when Ertl drew a .38 Colt Cobra revolver and shot him three times in the chest. After a brief altercation with Quintanilla's wife Ertl escaped; Quintanilla died shortly afterwards.

The ELN claimed responsibility for the assassination and described it as revenge for the death of Peredo. At the time media reports laid doubts on the claim as the ELN was viewed as relatively ineffective. The weapon used to kill Quintanilla had been purchased illegally by Giangiacomo Feltrinelli in Milan a few years prior. Former Nazi and collaborator with the Bolivian dictatorship Klaus Barbie arranged the repatriation of Quintanilla's remains and the handing of his cremated ashes to his wife. Barbie was a former comrade of Ertl's father Hans Ertl and had visited her in Bolivia. Monika Ertl was planning to abduct Barbie when she was killed by Bolivian police in 1973. Quintanilla has been described as a victim of "Che's curse", a series of deaths and other negative consequences said to attach to those involved with his capture and execution.
