= Lise Lesèvre =

Member of the French Resistance

- Lesèvre outside the Lyon court house, 1987
- Born: 16 January 1901; Domène, Isère, France
- Died: 13 September 1992 (aged 91); Paris, France
- Known for: Member of the French Resistance; Holocaust survivor; Witness at the Klaus Barbie trial

Elizabeth "Lise" Lesèvre (1901–1992) was a French member of the Resistance during the occupation of France in World War II and a prominent witness for the prosecution at the trial of Klaus Barbie for crimes against humanity.

== Early life ==
Lesèvre was born Elisa Marie Louise Bogatto in the Domène commune of the Isère department, in southeastern France, to Jewish parents.

At the age of 18, she married Georges Lesèvre, a Christian, in Grenoble, with the family settling in Lyon. They had two sons, the youngest being Jean Pierre Lesèvre, born in 1927.

== In the French Resistance ==
In 1941, after the German armed forces occupied France, Lise Lesèvre, as well as her husband and their son, joined the French Resistance. Under the code name "Severane," her main task was printing anti-Nazi literature and delivering Resistance messages, as well as initiating and training recruits in the Resistance.

During the period of March–April 1943, students in France mobilised against the forced enlistment and deportation of hundreds of thousands of French workers to the Third Reich to work there as forced labour for the German war effort, a program under the title Service du Travail Obligatoire or STO. In the lecture halls of Lyon, the protest was organized by an inter-faculty committee created by Christian Resistance students, including Georges Lesèvre, jointly with the communists.

On 13 March 1944, Lise Lesèvre is arrested by the Gestapo at the Gare de Lyon-Perrache train station, while carrying a message for a Resistance leading member code named "Didier." The next day, her husband and their 16-year-old son are also arrested.

She is taken to the Lyon-Bron medical school of the French armed forces, impounded and operated by the German police, where she is personally interrogated and tortured by the Gestapo's Lyon commander Obersturmführer Klaus Barbie. She is hung by hand cuffs with spikes, forced under freezing water in a bathtub, and beaten with a spiked ball against her back, a torture that eventually breaks a vertebra. Despite the 19-day-long, intense torture, she does not reveal any names and is condemned to death by a German military tribunal for "terrorism". The Gestapo places her by mistake in the wrong cell and, instead of being executed, she is deported to the Ravensbrück concentration camp. She is subsequently transferred to the Leipzig Kommando labor camp where anti-aircraft shells are manufactured for the Luftwaffe.

Her husband and their youngest son, after their interrogation, were taken respectively to the Dachau concentration camp and the commercial vessel Cap Arcona that was serving as a prison while stationed in the southwestern Baltic Sea port of the Bay of Lübeck. Her son was killed when the prison ship was hit during the May 1945 bombing of the port by the RAF, while her husband perished in Dachau from typhus, in April 1945, before the camp was liberated by American troops.

She survived the war and was awarded in 1946, as was, posthumously, her husband, the Resistance Medal.

== Barbie trial ==
After spending most of his post-war life as a fugitive but also as a collaborator of numerous national police and intelligence organizations, including the US Army's Counterintelligence Corps and West Germany's Bundesnachrichtendienst, Klaus Barbie is arrested (Note: The French courts had sentenced Barbie in absentia to death for war crimes, when their authorities discovered that the former SS officer was in American hands. They requested from John J. McCloy, US High Commissioner for Germany, to hand Barbie over for execution, but McCloy refused. See Cockburn, Clair (1998)) in February 1983, in La Paz, Bolivia, by the newly elected democratic government of Hernán Siles Zuazo, following the fall of the military dictatorship. A few days later, the government delivers him to France to stand trial.

The trial starts on 11 May 1987, in Lyon, before the Rhône Cour d'Assises and Lise Lesèvre is among the witnesses called upon by prosecutor Pierre Truche. She testifies in detail about the torture she suffered at the hands of Barbie and identifies the "butcher of Lyon" for the court. (Note: Lesevre, in her testimony, says: "Oh, I recognized Barbie all right. He had astonishing eyes, very blue, very clear, full of movement. I recognized him without effort, first on television when he was discovered in Bolivia, and then, when I was confronted with him, I recognized him in person." See Collections, USHMM (2024).) Declining to testify sitting down, she relates the "infinite pleasure" in the torture that Barbie, a sadique à l'état pur (a "pure sadist"), inflicted onto his prisoners. Nazi hunter Serge Klarsfeld, years later, read a passage from a book written by Barbie's lawyer at the trial, Jacques Verges, which ostensibly related Barbie's reaction upon seeing the upright Lesèvre on the witness stand: "At 80,[sic] doesn't she have anything else to do but drag herself in front of the cameras on her crutches? When you've suffered, you stay home and keep quiet."

The court, on 4 July 1987, convicted Barbie and sentenced him to life imprisonment. (Note: The death penalty had been abolished in France in 1981. Barbie died from leukemia in 1991, in the Lyon prison, four years after the trial. See NYT (1991).)

== Death ==
Lesèvre died on 13 September 1992 from natural causes, one year after Barbie's death. Her body's buried in the Père Lachaise Cemetery, at the 20th arrondissement of Paris.
