= Rue Sainte-Catherine Roundup =

Nazi arrest of Jews in Lyon

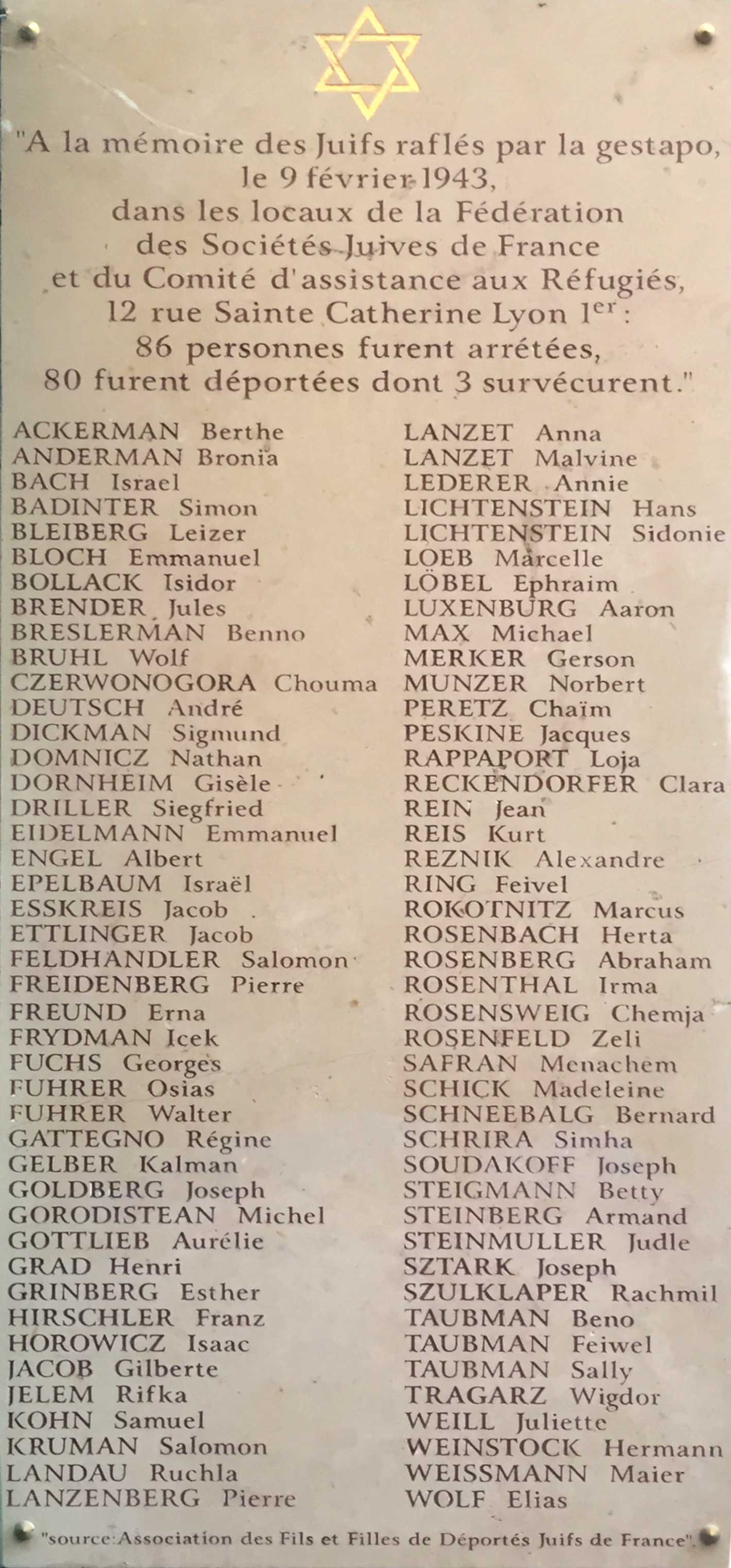
- Commemorative plaque of the roundup victims, rue Sainte-Catherine in Lyon
- Native name: Rafle de la rue Sainte-Catherine
- English name: Rue Sainte-Catherine Roundup
- Date: 9 February 1943
- Location: Lyon
- Organised by: Gestapo
- Outcome: 83 deported
- Arrests: 86 people: 24 women; 62 men

The rue Sainte-Catherine Roundup was a Nazi raid and mass arrest of Jews in Lyon's Sainte-Catherine street by the Gestapo. The raid, ordered and personally overseen by Klaus Barbie, took place on 9 February 1943 at the Fédération des sociétés juives de France (Federation of Jewish Societies of France), then located at the number 12 of this street. To catch as many people as possible, the Nazis not only chose the day the Federation normally gave free medical treatment and food to poor Jewish refugees, but they also set up a trap by forcing arrested Federation employees to encourage further people to come to the 12 rue Sainte Catherine.

A total of 86 Jewish people were arrested, 84 of whom were then sent to the Drancy internment camp. Ultimately 83 people were deported to the extermination camps of Sobibor and Auschwitz, and to a lesser extent to Bergen-Belsen, Dachau, and Majdanek. Of those arrested, two escaped before deportation, one was released from Drancy, and only three survived the extermination camps. A number of victims belonged to the French Resistance. The rue Sainte-Catherine Roundup was one of the main charges against Barbie at his trial. Malvine Lanzet, then 14 years old, the prisoner released from Drancy, testified at the trial in 1987. Further written testimonies were given by the few surviving witnesses.

== Context ==
In 1943, the offices of the fifth chapter of the Union Générale des Israélites de France (UGIF, General union of Israelites of France) were located at 12 Rue Sainte-Catherine in Lyon. Officially, the UGIF was an organisation created by the collaborationist government of Vichy France under the auspices of Nazi Germany. In Lyon, it resulted from the merging of two pre-war entities: the Comité intergouvernemental pour les réfugiés (intergovernmental committee for refugees), created in 1938 to help Austrian and German Jewish refugees settle in France; and a branch of the French Jewish Society. During the war, it was nominally placed under the control of the Commissariat-General for Jewish Affairs.

The UGIF actually acted in secret for the social assistance and welfare of Jewish people, receiving funding from the American Quakers and, as the Nazis believed, from a Geneva-based Jewish society. The association provided shelter and general help to refugees from all over Europe arriving in Lyon since before the war. The UGIF also provided counterfeit papers and helped smuggle people abroad, in particular to Switzerland. The organisation included a number of non-Jewish helpers as well, who provided temporary housing for some refugees. These activities became known by the Nazis and served as a pretext for the Gestapo to raid the UGIF premises in Lyon, although their actual aim was simply to round up and send as many Jews as possible to the extermination camps.

== Roundup ==
=== Events ===
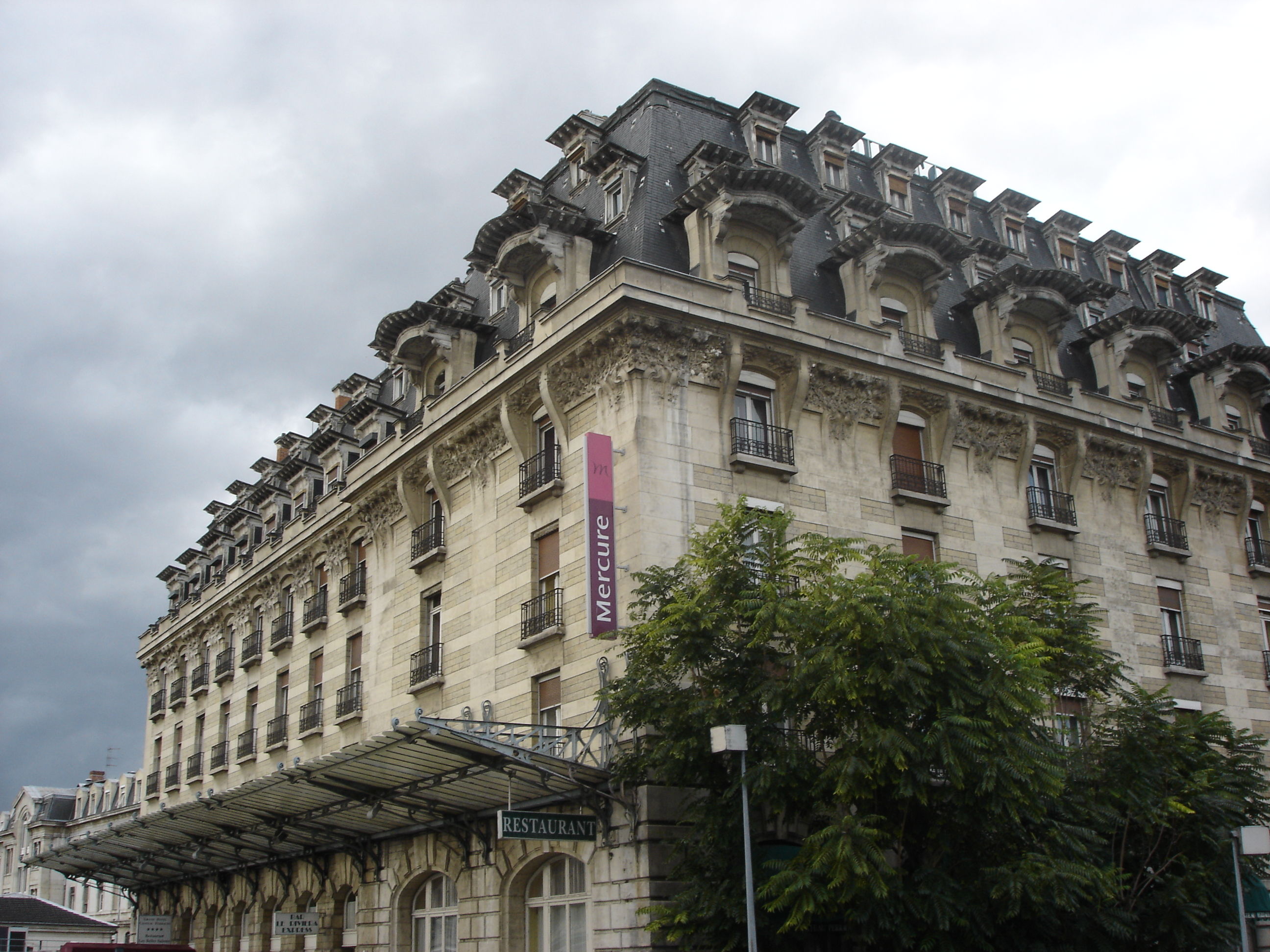
Hôtel Terminus was the seat of the Gestapo in Lyon during the war

On Tuesday, 9 February 1943, the Gestapo, acting under the direction of Klaus Barbie, who was personally present, decided to arrest the members of the UGIF in Lyon and set up a trap to arrest all people visiting them. They chose a Tuesday because this was the day that the UGIF gave free food and administered medical treatments to the needy.

Gilberte Jacob, one of the few survivors of the roundup reported at the trial of Barbie that she was at her reception desk when, in the early afternoon, three men armed with revolvers arrested her. In total 30 people were present in the UGIF offices when a dozen Gestapo men dressed in plain clothes arrived. In the following hours, the Gestapo forced the UGIF receptionists to answer calls as usual and to especially encourage people to visit the UGIF that day. Four or five Gestapo members plus Barbie interrogated everybody. The Gestapo trap worked and soon two rooms were filled with 80 people. The Nazis took all their belongings.

Among the arrested people were Victor Szulklaper and Michel Kroskof-Thomas, who both managed to convince Barbie that they were not Jewish thanks to counterfeit documents. Kroskof-Thomas explained his presence by arguing that he was a painter. After he was let go, he tried to warn as many people as possible not to go to the Union office. In 1983 he provided crucial testimony in which he reported that Barbie was personally present at the UGIF premises on the day of the roundup. In 1985, he also formally identified Barbie in prison. Also initially arrested were Annette Grinszpan and her infant son René Grinszpan, then eight months old. Using counterfeit papers she passed as Alsacian, but ultimately Barbie sent her away because her baby was crying loudly.

On 8 February 1943, Léa Katz-Weiss, then 16 years old, had overheard that a roundup was going to take place in the Grande synagogue de Lyon the next day. Looking for Rabbi Schonberg to warn him, she went to the UGIF offices in the afternoon of the 9th where she was arrested. She managed to convince a Gestapo officer to let her go in exchange for her coming back the next morning to the Hôtel Terminus, so that she could warn her ill mother of her impending departure. Eva Gottlieb, receptionist at the UGIF, used counterfeit papers to claim she was unrelated to the UGIF and was only bringing back a Beethoven music score to a friend, so she was consequently let go. Both Eva Gottlieb and Annette Grinszpan gave written testimonies at the trial of Barbie.

=== Fate of the prisoners ===
At the end of the day, the Gestapo had arrested 86 people, of whom 62 were men and 24 women. In the early evening they were forced into two trucks and sent to Fort Lamothe, a military casern that served as a temporary prison as the normal Montluc prison was full. They were left there, crammed into two rooms without food or water for two days under the control of the Wehrmacht. Two people, David Luksemberg and Driller Siegfried, managed to escape during this time in the early morning hours of 11 February 1943. (Note: On 15 February 1943, Barbie notified his superiors of the evasion, mistakenly stating that "Aron Luxembourg", the brother of David, and Siegfried Driller had escaped.)

The 84 prisoners still in German hands were sent by train convoy to the Drancy internment camp, north of Paris. At some point, Malvine Lanzet was released from Drancy, possibly owing to her youth and placed in the care of the UGIF in Paris. The remaining 83 people were deported to the Extermination camps of Sobibor, Auschwitz, Bergen-Belsen and Majdanek. Among these, only three survived.

== Victims ==
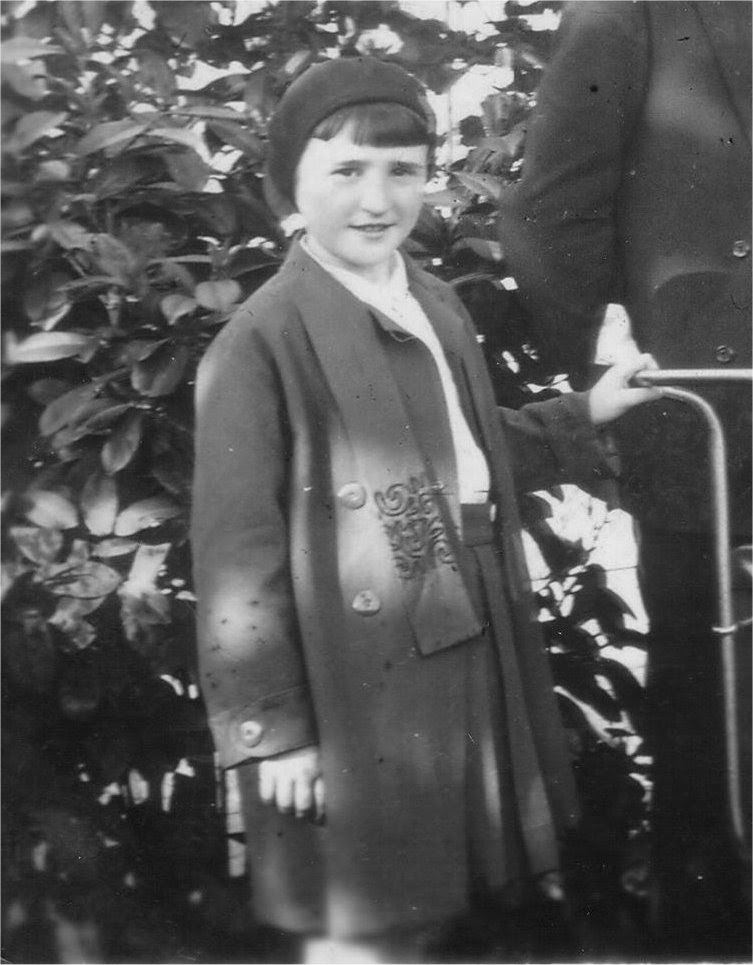
Lola Rappaport, a victim of the Rue Sainte-Catherine Roundup, here in 1932

Complete list of people arrested during the Rue Sainte-Catherine Roundup with their age at the time of arrest, given in alphabetical order:

1. Berthe Ackerman (also Berthe Akierman), 22 years old, murdered in Sobibor. (Note: Born in 1921 in Paris, she was deported with the Train Convoy No. 53, from Drancy to Sobibor on 25 March 1943.)
2. Bronia Andermann, 36 years old, murdered in Sobibor. (Note: Born on 3 September 1906 in Buezaz, Poland. She was deported with Convoy No. 52, from Drancy to Sobibor on 23 March 1943.)
3. Israël Bach, 54 years old, murdered in Auschwitz. (Note: Born on 19 June 1889 in Przemyśl, Poland. He was deported with Convoy No. 49, on 2 March 1943, from Drancy to Auschwitz.)
4. Simon Badinter, father of the French politician Robert Badinter, 47 years old, murdered in Sobibor.
5. Leizer Bleiberg (also Bleuberg), 43 years old, murdered in Auschwitz. (Note: Born 9 May 1899 in Bortchoff, Poland, he was deported with Convoy No. 49, on 2 March 1943 from Drancy to Auschwitz.)
6. Emmanuel Bloch, 68 years old, murdered in Auschwitz. (Note: Born on 16 September 1874 in Niederrœdern, he died on 31 July 1943.)
7. Isidore Bollack, 72 years old, murdered in Auschwitz (Note: Born 17 October 1870 in Sicrentz. He was sent from Drancy to Auschwitz with Convoy No. 59, on 2 September 1943. Isidore Bollack was the son of Moïse Bollack and Claire Picard. He married Alice Haymann in Lyon.)
8. Julius Brender (also Jules Brender), 44 years old, murdered in Sobibor. (Note: He was born on 26 July 1898 in Pastauna. He was deported from Drancy to Sobibor with Convoy No. 53, on 25 March 1943.)
9. Wolf Brull (also Wolf Bruhl), 62 years old, murdered in Auschwitz. (Note: Born on 1 December 1880 in Jarosław, Poland. He was sent from Drancy to Auschwitz with Convoy No. 49, on 2 March 1943.)
10. Chuma Czerwonogora (also Chouna Czerwonogora), 32 years old, murdered in Auschwitz. (Note: Born on 21 May 1911 in Belchatow, Poland. Sent from Drancy to Auschwitz with Convoy No. 55, on 23 June 1943.)
11. André Deutsch, 34 years old, was bringing 30,000 Francs to the UGIF for poor refugees which were stolen by the Gestapo. He was murdered in Auschwitz. (Note: Deported to Auschwitz, where he actively participated in the French Committee for Solidarity with Henry Bulawko. Born on 14 March 1909 in Lugos. Before his arrest, he lived at the 80 rue de Trarieux in Lyon. He was sent from Drancy to Auschwitz with Convoy No. 55, on 23 June 1943.)
12. Sigmund Dickmann, 33 years old, murdered in Auschwitz. (Note: He was born on 21 September 1909 in Stanislav, Poland. He was deported from Drancy to Auschwitz with Convoy No. 49, on 2 March 1943.)
13. Noel (also Nathan) Domnicz, 22 years old, murdered in Sobibor. (Note: Born on 9 Octobre 1920 in Warsaw, Poland. He was deported from Drancy to Sobibor with Convoy No. 53, on 25 March 1943.)
14. Gisèle Dornheim (born Gisèle Flesch), 45 years old, murdered in Sobibor. (Note: Born on 18 September 1898 in Vienna, she was sent from Drancy to Sobibor with Convoy No. 53, on 25 March 1943.)
15. Emmanuel Edelmann, 35 years old, murdered in Auschwitz. (Note: Born on 2 February 1908 in Poland. He was sent from Drancy to Auschwitz with Convoy No. 49, on 2 March 1943.)
16. Albert Engel, 53 years old, murdered in Auschwitz. (Note: Born on 14 April 1889 in Berlin. He was sent from Drancy to Auschwitz with Convoy No. 49, on 2 March 1943.)
17. Israel Epelbaum, 47 years old, murdered in Sobibor. (Note: Born in 1896 in Nadimine, France. He was sent from Drancy to Sobibor with Convoy No. 53, on 25 March 1943.)
18. Jacob Esskreis, 65 years old, murdered in Auschwitz. (Note: Born on 15 December 1877 in Lviv, then a part of Poland but now in Ukraine. He was sent from Drancy to Auschwitz with Convoy No. 49, on 2 March 1943.)
19. Jacob Ettlinger (ou Jacob Ettinger), 39 years old, murdered in Sobibor. (Note: Born on 20 August 1903 in Budapest, Hungary. He was deported from Drancy to Sobibor with Convoy No. 53, on 25 March 1943.)
20. Salomon Feldhandler, 35 years old, murdered in Sobibor. (Note: Born on 28 March 1908 in Vienna. He was deported from Drancy to Sobibor with Convoy No. 53, on 25 March 1943.)
21. Pierre Freidenberg, 42 years old, murdered in Sobibor. (Note: Born on 11 July 1901 in Beaune, France. He was sent from Drancy to Sobibor with Convoy No. 53, on 25 March 1943.)
22. Erna Freund, 54 years old, murdered in Sobibor. (Note: Born on 27 July 1888 in Erfurt, Germany. She was deported with Convoy No. 52, on 23 March 1943 from Drancy to Sobibor.)
23. Icek Frydmann, 34 years old, murdered in Majdanek. (Note: Born on 25 May 1908 in Nolomeri, Poland. He was sent from Drancy to Majdanek with Convoy No. 51, on 6 March 1943.)
24. Georg Fuchs, 37 years old, murdered in Sobibor. (Note: Born on 25 August 1905 in Hidaskürt, now Mostová in Slovakia. He was sent from Drancy to Sobibor with Convoy No. 53, on 25 March 1943.)
25. Osias Fuhrer, 53 years old, murdered in Auschwitz. (Note: Born on 22 February 1890, in Przemyśl, Poland. He was sent from Drancy to Auschwitz with Convoy No. 49, on 2 March 1943.)
26. Walter Fuhrer, 18 years old, murdered in Auschwitz. (Note: Born on 22 November 1924 in Vienna. He was sent with Convoy No. 49, on 2 March 1943 from Drancy to Auschwitz.)
27. Régine Gattegno, 19 years old, member of the French Resistance, murdered in Sobibor on 30 March 1943. (Note: Born on 15 September 1923 in Lyon. She was sent with Convoy No. 53, on 25 March 1943 from Drancy to Sobibor.)
28. Kalman Gelber (also Kalmann Gelber), 42 years old, murdered in Auschwitz. (Note: Born on 4 March 1900 in Brechatza, Romania. He was sent from Drancy to Auschwitz with Convoy No. 49, on 2 March 1943.)
29. Joseph Goldberg, 40 years old, murdered in Majdanek. (Note: Born on 20 May 1902 in Magalnica, Poland. He was sent from Drancy to Majdanek with Convoy No. 51, on 6 March 1943.)
30. Michel Gorodistan (also Michel Gorodistean), 42 years old, murdered in Auschwitz. (Note: Born on 10 February 1901 in Kirnienew, Russia. He was sent from Drancy to Auschwitz with Convoy No. 55, on 23 June 1943.)
31. Aurélie Gottlieb, 51 years old, member of the French Resistance, murdered in Auschwitz on 28 June 1943. (Note: Born in 1892. She was sent from Drancy to Auschwitz with Convoy No. 55.)
32. Heinrich Grad (also Henri Grad), 44 years old, murdered in Auschwitz. (Note: Born on 18 May 1899 in Radkowicz. He was sent from Drancy to Auschwitz with Convoy No. 49 on 2 March 1943.)
33. Esther Grinberg, 32 years old, murdered in Sobibor. (Note: Born on 16 October 1910 in Paris. She was sent from Drancy to Sobibor with Convoy No. 53, on 25 March 1943.)
34. Paul Guerin (also Benno Breslerman), 13 years old, murdered in Sobibor. (Note: Born on 1 December 1929 in Marseille, France. He was sent from Drancy to Sobibor with Convoy No. 53, on 25 March 1943.)
35. Franz Hirschler (also Frantz Hirschler), 52 years old, murdered in Auschwitz. (Note: Born on 16 February 1891 in Mannheim, Germany. He was sent from Drancy to Auschwitz with Convoy No. 49 on 2 March 1943.)
36. Isaac Horowicz, 33 years old, murdered in Auschwitz. (Note: Born on 16 January 1910 in Brzesborg. He was sent from Drancy to Auschwitz with Convoy No. 49 on 2 March 1943.)
37. Gilberte Jacob (later Gilberte Lévy), 30 years old, deported to Bergen-Belsen she survived the war and was a witness at the trial of Klaus Barbie. (Note: She was born on 25 January 1913 in Paris. At the time of her arrest, she lived at 40 Rue Michel Servet in Lyon. She was sent from Drancy to Bergen-Belsen with Convoy No. 80, on 23 July 1944.)
38. Ryfka Jelem, 41 years old, murdered in Auschwitz. (Note: Born on 3 September 1901 in Smiobitch, Poland. She was sent from Drancy to Auschwitz with Convoy No. 49 on 2 March 1943.)
39. Samuel Kohn, 42 years old, member of the French Resistance, murdered in Auschwitz. (Note: Born on 12 July 1901 in Paris. In Drancy he tried to escape by digging a tunnel with others but was caught. He was deported to Auschwitz with Convoi No. 62 on 20 November 1943 and died later that same month.)
40. Salomon Kruman, 41 years old, murdered in Auschwitz. (Note: Born on 20 January 1909 in Mykulyntsi, Ukraine. He was deported from Drancy to Auschwitz with Convoy No. 49, on 2 March 1943.)
41. Ruchla Landau, 41 years old, murdered in Auschwitz. (Note: Born on 11 October 1901 in Chrzanów, Poland. She was deported from Drancy to Auschwitz with Convoy No. 49, on 2 March 1943.)
42. Pierre Lanzenberg, 43 years old, dermatologist, member of the French Resistance, murdered in Sobibor. (Note: Born on 3 January 1900 in Colmar, France. He was deported to Sobibor from Dancy after a brief period at the Beaune-la-Rolande internment camp, aboard Convoy No. 53 on 25 March 1943. He killed in Sobibor on 30 March 1943.)
43. Anna Lanzet, 43 years old, mother of Malvine Lanzet, murdered in Auschwitz. (Note: Born on 10 August 1900 in Bolechowo, Poland. She was transferred to the Rothschild hospital on 15 March 1943 but was arrested there by members of the SS under the direction of Alois Brunner. She was deported from Drancy to Auschwitz with Convoy No. 62, on 20 November 1943.)
44. Malvine Lanzet (later Malvine Kessler), 14 years old. After she arrived in Drancy, she was released on 12 June 1943 and went to an orphanage in Paris where she was cared for by the Union. She was a witness at the trial of Klaus Barbie. (Note: Born on 4 or 11 August 1928 in Vienna, she was freed from Drancy on 12 June 1943.)
45. Annie Lederer, 27 years old, murdered in Sobibor. (Note: Born on 12 April 1915 in Habeloutz. She was sent from Drancy to Sobibor with Convoy No. 53, on 25 March 1943.)
46. Hans Lichtenstein, 41 years old, murdered in Auschwitz. (Note: Born on 11 April 1901 in Deina-Szezdahe. He was sent from Drancy to Auschwitz with Convoy No. 55, on 23 June 1943.)
47. Sidonie Lichtenstein, 37 years old, murdered in Auschwitz. (Note: Born on 23 June 1905, in Uherský Brod, Czech Republic. She was sent from Drancy to Auschwitz with Convoy No. 55, on 23 June 1943.)
48. Marcelle Loeb, 19 years old, murdered in Sobibor. (Note: Born on 28 April 1923 in Strasbourg, France. Nicknamed Topy, she was Pierre Lanzenberg's assistant as his medical practice, living in Lyon at the time of the roundup. She was sent from Drancy to Sobibor with Convoy No. 53 on 25 March 1943. She was killed there on 30 March 1943.)
49. Ephraim Loebel (also Ephraim Lobel), 57 years old, murdered in Auschwitz. (Note: Born on 10 May 1885 in Kanena. He was sent from Drancy to Sobibor with Convoy No. 49 on 2 March 1943.)
50. Michael Max, 52 years old, murdered in Auschwitz. (Note: Born on 12 March 1891, in Pilgersdorf, Austria. Michael Max was sent from Drancy to Auschwitz with Convoy No. 49, on 2 March 1943.)
51. Gerson Merker, 54 years old, murdered in Auschwitz. (Note: Born on 29 August 1888 in Tyśmienica, Lublin Voivodeship. He was sent from Drancy to Auschwitz aboard Convoy No. 49, on 2 March 1943.)
52. Norbert Muntzer (or Norbert Munzer), 34 years old, murdered in Auschwitz. (Note: Born on 20 August 1908 in Vienna. He was sent from Drancy to Auschwitz aboard Convoy No. 49, on 2 March 1943.)
53. Chaim Peretz, 57 years old, murdered in Auschwitz. (Note: Born on 22 February 1886 in Poland. He was deported from Drancy to Auschwitz with Convoy No. 48, on 13 February 1943.)
54. Jacques Peskine, 61 years old, murdered in Auschwitz. (Note: Born on 7 August 1881 in Vilnius. He was deported from Drancy to Auschwitz with Convoy No. 48, on 13 February 1943.)
55. Lola Rappaport (also Loja Rappaport or Laja Rapaport), 21 years old, murdered in Auschwitz. (Note: Born on 30 December 1922 or 30 December 1920 in Częstochowa, Poland. At the time of her arrest, she lived at the 17, Rue de Sully in Roanne. She was deported aboard Convoy No. 57, from Drancy to Auschwitz or Sobibor on 18 July 1943.)
56. Klara Reckendorfer, 45 years old, murdered in Auschwitz. (Note: Born on 23 March 1898, in Nuremberg, Germany. She was deported with Convoy No. 49, on 2 March 1943 from Drancy to Auschwitz.)
57. Jean-Jacques (Joseph) Rein, 23 years old, murdered in Sobibor. (Note: Born on 28 February 1920, in Mulhouse, France. Member of the French Resistance, he made counterfeit papers and set up safe houses for refugees. He was deported from Drancy to Sobibor aboard Convoy No. 53 on 25 March 1943. He was murdered there on 30 March 1943.)
58. Kurt Reis, 42 years old, unknown fate. (Note: Born on 2 February 1901 in Nuremberg.)
59. Alexandre Reznik, 47 years old, murdered in Auschwitz. (Note: Born on 10 July 1895 in Riga. He was sent from Drancy to Auschwitz aboard Convoy No. 49, on 2 March 1943.)
60. Feiwel Ring, 33 years old, murdered in Auschwitz. (Note: Born on 12 May 1910 in Novesacht. He was sent from Drancy to Auschwitz aboard Convoy No. 49, on 2 March 1943.)
61. Marcus Rokotnitz (or Marais Rokonitz), 42 years old, murdered in Auschwitz. (Note: Born on 28 June 1900 or 28 August 1900 in Zauckh, Austria. He was sent from Drancy to Auschwitz aboard Convoy No. 49, on 2 March 1943.)
62. Herta Rosenbach, 35 years old, murdered in Auschwitz. (Note: Born on 12 January 1908 in Hertstedt, in Czechoslovakia. She was deported from Drancy to Auschwitz aboard Convoy No. 49, on 2 March 1943.)
63. Abraham Rosenberg, 64 years old, murdered in Auschwitz. (Note: Born on 15 September 1879 in Mykolaïv, Ukraine. He was deported from Drancy to Auschwitz with Convoy No. 49 on 2 March 1943.)
64. Zeli Rosenfeld, 48 years old, unknown fate. (Note: Born on 11 August 1894 in Kotseloc.)
65. Irma Rosenthal, 64 years old, murdered in Auschwitz. (Note: Born on 9 July 1878 in Illkirch-Graffenstaden, France. She was sent from Drancy to Auschwitz with Convoy No. 59, on 2 September 1943. Her brother, Marcel Baumann, aged 63 and living in Villefranche-sur-Saone was born on 17 June 1881 in Ilkirrch. He was also deported from Drancy to Auschwitz, but aboard Convoy No. 77, on 31 July 1944.)
66. Henri Rosencweig (also Chemja Rosensweig or Chamja Rosensweig), 25 years old, murdered in Auschwitz. (Note: Born on 3 June 1917 in Bratislava, Slovakia, then known as Presburg.)
67. Menachem Safran, 42 years old, murdered in Auschwitz. (Note: Born on 29 July 1900 in Krosno, Poland. He was sent from Drancy to Auschwitz on Convoy No. 49, 2 March 1943.)
68. Madeleine Schick, 22 years old, murdered in Sobibor. (Note: Born on 22 November 1920 in Colmar, France. She was sent from Drancy to Sobibor with Convoy No. 53, on 25 March 1943.)
69. Bernard Schneebalg (or Bernard Schnelbalg), 43 years old, murdered in Sobibor. (Note: Born on 31 March 1899 in Katity, Czechoslovakia. He was onboard Convoy No. 53, on 25 March 1943 from Drancy to Sobibor.)
70. Simha Schkira, 50 years old, unknown fate. (Note: Born on 15 January 1893 in Romania.)
71. Joseph Soudakoff (or Joseph Soudrkoff), 52 years old, murdered in Auschwitz. (Note: Born on 25 July 1890 in Chernihiv then in Poland but now in Ukraine. He was onboard Convoy No. 49 2 March 1943 from Drancy to Auschwitz.)
72. Betty Steigmann, 36 years old, murdered in Auschwitz. (Note: Born on 9 September 1906 in Straieg, Poland. She was onboard Convoy No. 49, which departed Drancy for Auschwitz on 2 March 1943.)
73. Armand Steinberg, 32 years old. Dentist, he was deported to Auschwitz and then to the Dachau concentration camp, surviving both ordeals. His testimony was read at the trial of Klaus Barbie. He was interviewed for the documentary Les Témoins impossibles (Impossible witnesses) in 1987. (Note: Born on 25 July 1910 in Paris. He was deported from Drancy to Auschwitz onboard Convoy No. 57 18 July 1943. Liberated in May 1945 from Dachau.)
74. Jules Steinmuller, 48 years old, murdered in Auschwitz. (Note: Born on 12 March 1895 in Lubartów, Poland. He was onboard Convoy No. 49 on 2 March 1943 from Drancy to Auschwitz.)
75. Joseph Sztark, 31 years old, murdered in Auschwitz. (Note: Born on 6 July 1911 in Wlanow, Poland. He was onboard Convoy No. 49 on 2 March 1943 from Drancy to Auschwitz.)
76. Rachmill Szulklaper (also Sullaper), 31 years old, brother of Victor Szulklaper who was released owing to good counterfeit papers in his possession identifying him as a French citizen. Deported to Auschwitz, Rachmill survived the war and died in 1984, on the eve of the trial of Klaus Barbie. (Note: Born on 2 September 1911 in Sosnowik, Poland.)
77. Benno Taubmann, 33 years old, murdered in Sobibor. (Note: Born on 13 April 1910 in Chernivtsi, then in Romania but now in Ukraine. He was onboard Convoy No. 52, which departed Drancy for Sobibor on 23 March 1943.)
78. Feiwel Taubmann, 60 years old, murdered in Sobibor. (Note: Born on 12 October 1882 in Snyalin. He was onboard Convoy No. 52, which departed Drancy for Sobibor on 23 March 1943.)
79. Sally Taubmann, 63 years old, murdered in Sobibor. (Note: Born on 18 September 1879 in Mielnica Mała, Poland or Mielnica, Ukraine. She was onboard Convoy No. 53, which departed Drancy for Sobibor on 25 March 1943.)
80. Victor Tlagarza (or Victor Tlagarz), 43 years old, murdered in Auschwitz. (Note: Born on 10 May 1899 in Łódź, Poland. He was onboard Convoy No. 49 from Drancy to Auschwitz on 2 March 1943.)
81. Juliette Weill, 21 years old, member of the French Resistance murdered in Sobibor. (Note: Born on 23 November 1921 in Strasbourg, France. Here letters to her family written while she was in Drancy have been preserved and were read during commemorations of the roundup. She was deported from Drancy to Sobibor with Convoy No. 53 on 25 March 1943. She died on 30 March 1943.)
82. Hermann Weinstock, 47 years old, murdered in Auschwitz. (Note: Born on 2 January 1896 in Troza. She was deported from Drancy to Auschwitz onboard Convoy No. 49, on 2 March 1943.)
83. Maier Weismann, 57 years old. The day of the roundup, he was bringing 225,000 Francs in funds from the US to help poor refugees in Lyon. This was stolen by the Gestapo and he was murdered in Sobibor. (Note: Born on 5 December 1885 in Korczyna, Poland. He was onboard Convoy No. 53 on 25 March 1943 from Drancy to Sobibor.)
84. Elias Wolf, 65 years old, murdered in Auschwitz. (Note: Born on 14 June 1878 in Starasol, then in Poland but now in Ukraine. He was onboard Convoy No. 49, which departed Drancy for Auschwitz on 2 March 1943.)

The four survivors from the 84 arrested were:

1. Gilberte Jacob, later Gilberte Lévy, witness at the trial of Klaus Barbie;
2. Malvine Lanzet, later Malvine Kessler, witness at the trial of Klaus Barbie;
3. Armand Steinberg;
4. Rachmill Szulklaper.

And the two prisoners who escaped from Fort Lamothe :

1. Siegfried Driller, born 16 September 1896, in Vienna;
2. David Luksemberg (also David Luxembourg).

== Legacy ==
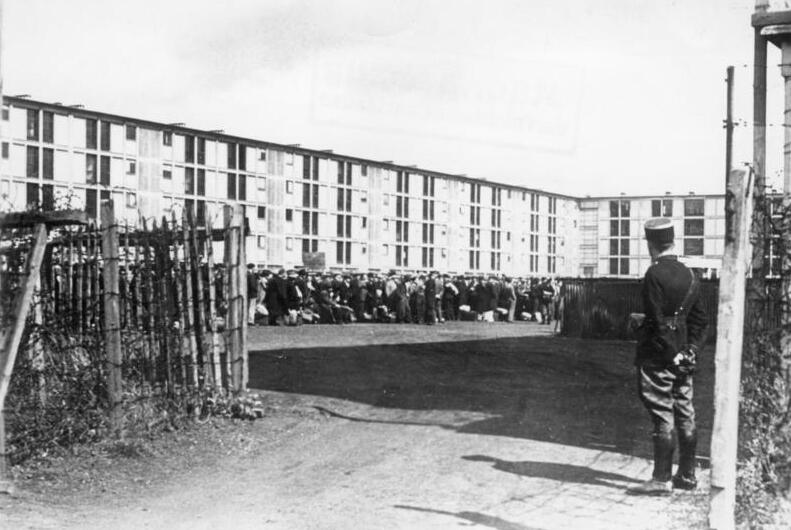
Drancy where 84 of the 86 people arrested during the roundup were imprisoned until their departure to the extermination camps.

Following the roundup, the Nazis closed the premises of the UGIF at the Rue Sainte-Catherine. In April 1943, the head of the UGIF in Lyon at the time of the roundup, Robert Kahn, was sacked and replaced by Raymond Geissmann. Geissmann chose new collaborators and relocated the UGIF to the 9 Rue de l'Hôtel de Ville. In spite of this, from then on most of the help to Jewish refugees came from elsewhere, for example from the office of the Rabbi of Lyon as the 5th chapter of the UGIF had been weakened by the roundup.

=== Barbie's trial ===
In 1983, Serge Klarsfeld accessed the archives of the Union générale des israélites de France which had been brought to the YIVO Institute for Jewish Research in New York shortly after 1945. Thanks to these documents as well as the list of arrivals at the Drancy camp on 12 February 1943, Klarsfeld managed to establish a complete list of names for the 84 victims.

The order signed by Barbie for the roundup was subsequently uncovered, which meant that the events of the Rue Sainte-Catherine were included at the trial of Barbie in 1987. Klarsfeld compiled these documents in the book La rafle de la rue Sainte-Catherine à Lyon le 9 février 1943 (The Rue Sainte-Catherine Roundup in Lyon on 9 February 1943). (Note: The book is available for free here.) The roundup of the Rue Sainte-Catherine was therefore instrumental in securing Barbie's life sentence.

=== Commemorative plaque ===
On 13 February 2011, on the occasion of the 68th anniversary of the roundup, a commemorative plaque was put in the Rue Sainte-Catherine with the names of the 84 people arrested on 9 February 1943. The plaque, donated by the Association des Fils et Filles des Déportés Juifs de France (Sons and Daughters of Jewish Deportees from France), was unveiled by the senator and mayor of Lyon, Gérard Collomb. Above the names of the victims, it bears the text:

"A la mémoire des Juifs raflés par la gestapo, le 9 février 1943, dans les locaux de la Fédération des Sociétés Juives de France et du Comité d'assistance aux Réfugiés,
12 rue Sainte Catherine Lyon 1^{er} : 86 personnes furent arrétées, 80 furent déportées dont 3 survécurent." [...]

"In remembrance of the Jews rounded up by the Gestapo on 9 February 1943 at the premises of the Fédération des Sociétés Juives de France and the Aid Committee for the Refugees, 12 Rue Sainte Catherine, Lyon 1: 86 people were arrested and 80 were deported of which 3 survived." [...]

A yearly commemoration takes place in Lyon in remembrance of the events of 9 February 1943. On the morning of 21 October 2019, the plaque was defaced with half of the names of the victims covered in black ink.

== See also ==
- Union générale des israélites de France

== Notes, references and sources ==
=== Sources ===
- Bernier, Gildas (2014). Témoignage sur Léo Glaeser (in French). Strasbourg: Editions Gildas Bernier. ISBN 979-1-093-51509-0.
- Bernstein, Richard (1987). "Barbie witnesses describe roundup". The New York Times.
- "Berthe Ackerman". Holocaust Survivors and Victims Database. 2019.
- Boche, Justin (2019). "Lyon: la plaque en mémoire de la rafle de la rue Saint-Catherine dégradée". Lyon Capitale.
- Collomb, Gérard (2011). "Discours de Monsieur Gérard COLLOMB Sénateur-Maire de Lyon A l'occasion de la cérémonie commémorant le 68e anniversaire de la Rafle de la rue Sainte-Catherine" (PDF).
- Chitrit, Armelle (2006). "Un parcours poétique pour la Résistance" (PDF). Frontières (in French). 19 (1): 99–104. doi:10.7202/016645ar.
- "Lyon: une plaque pour les victimes de la rafle du 9 février". 20minutes.fr. 13 February 2011.
- Doré-Rivé, Isabelle (2012). Vivier, Marion (ed.). Une ville dans la guerre: Lyon 1939-1945. Les collections du Centre d'Histoire de la Résistance et de la Déportation (in French). Lyon: Fage. ISBN 978-2-84975-279-1.
- Klarsfeld, Serge (1978). Mémorial de la Déportation des Juifs de France (in French). Fils et filles des déportés juifs de France. p. 812. OCLC 828859236.
- Klarsfeld, Serge (1985a). Vichy-Auschwitz. Tome 2, 1943-1944 le rôle de Vichy dans la solution finale de la question juive en France. Paris: Fayard. ISBN 9782213015736.
- Klarsfeld, Serge (1985b). La Rafle de la Rue Sainte-Catherine A Lyon. Le 9 février 1943 dans les locaux de la 1ère section (CAR) et de la 2ème section (FSJF) de la 5ème Direction "Assistance" de l'UGIF (PDF) (in French). Paris: Les Fils et Filles des Déportés Juifs de France. Yad Vashem. OCLC 24630721.
- "Kruman, Salomon". Mémorial GenWeb. 2019.
- "La rafle de la rue Ste Catherine à Lyon". Association Nationale des Ancients Combatants et Amis de la Résistance.
- "Le 9 février 1943, Klaus Barbie passe à l'action". Le Progrès. 2011.
- "30e anniversaire du procès Barbie" (PDF). Le Lien Francophone. 58. Jérusalem: Yad Vashem: 3. 2017.
- "Liste des personnes arrêtées rue Sainte-Catherine". jewishtraces.org.
- "Lola Rappaport". Holocaust Survivors and Victims Database. 2019.
- "Lyon - Commémoration de la rafle de la rue Sainte-Catherine". France 3 Rhône-Alpes. 2016.
- "Memorbuch du Haut-Rhin". judaisme.sdv.fr. 2019.
- Miller, Judith (1991). One by One by One. Facing the Holocaust. New York: Touchstone. ISBN 9780671740344.
- "Oral history interview with Victor Sullaper". United States Holocaust Memorial Museum. 2019.
- Rosenfeld-Katz, Danièle (2014). La Shoah traversée. Simone & Ladislas. ISBN 978-2-952-03410-4.
- "Simon Badinter. Plus qu'un nom dans une liste". Jewishtraces. 2012.
- "Union of French Jews" (PDF). Shoah Resource Center, The International School for Holocaust Studies. Yad Vashem. 2021.
