= Palais de justice historique de Lyon =

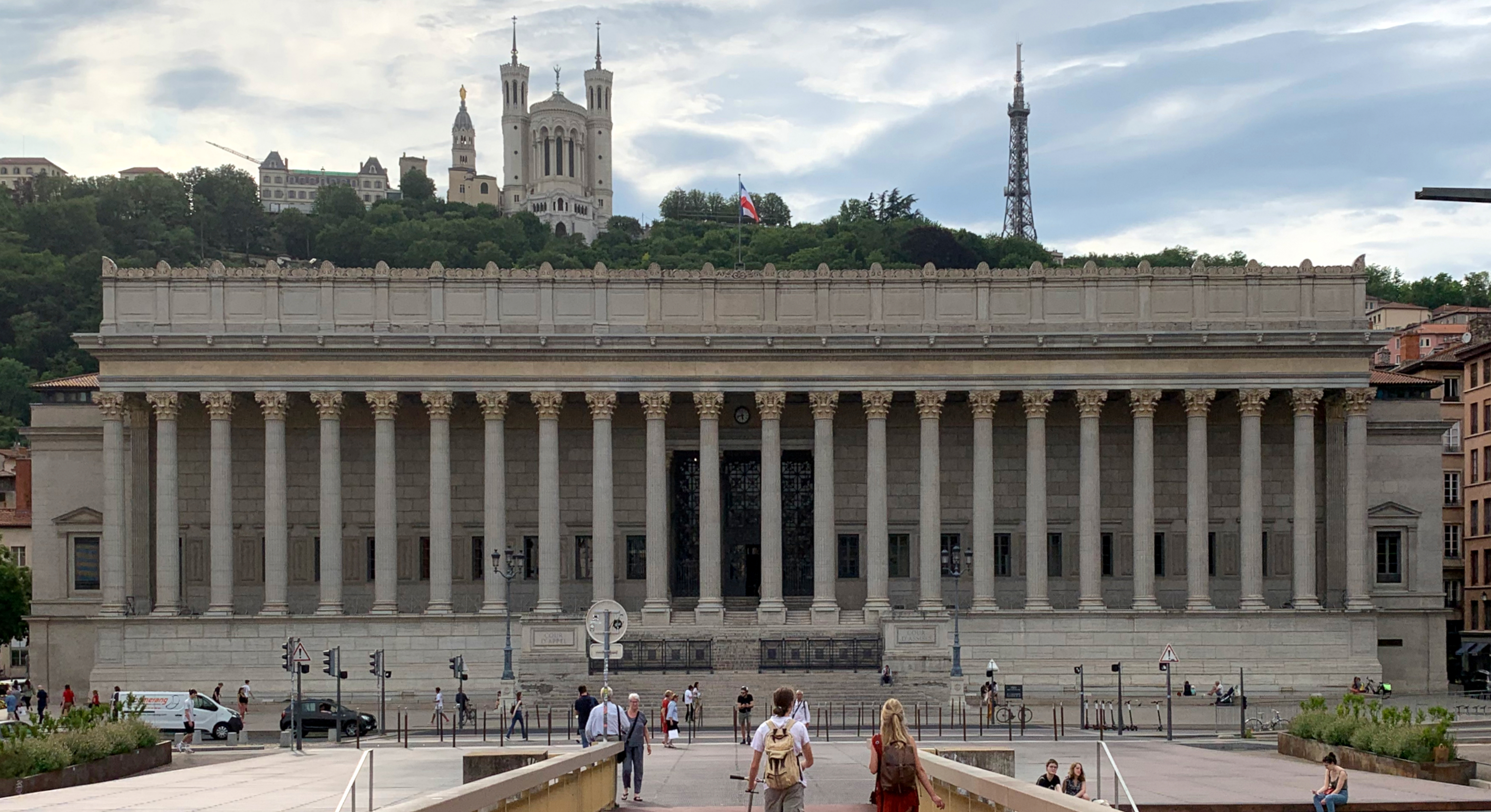
- Interactive map of the Palais de justice historique de Lyon area

General information
- Architectural style: neoclassical
- Classification: Monument Historique PA00117980 (1996)
- Location: 5th arrondissement of Lyon, Lyon, France
- Coordinates: 45°45′43″N 4°49′41″E
- Current tenants: French court
- Construction started: 1835
- Completed: 1845
- Client: French government
- Owner: French government

Design and construction
- Architect: Louis-Pierre Baltard

The Palais de justice historique de Lyon is a building located in Quai Romain Rolland, on the right bank of the Saône, in the 5th arrondissement of Lyon. In 1996, it was classified as a monument historique.

== History ==
Its construction began in 1835 and ended in 1845, under the direction of architect Louis-Pierre Baltard. It was built in the same location as the previous courthouses that had been there since the 15th century.

The Palais de Justice de Lyon is nicknamed the 'Palace of the twenty-four columns'. It is one of the finest neo-classical buildings in France.

In 1995, construction of a new courthouse in the district of La Part-Dieu allowed the transfer of the Tribunal de Grande Instance, the Tribunal d'Instance and the Tribunal de commerce de Lyon. The Cour d'appel of Lyon and the Cour d'assises of the Rhône remained installed in what is now the historic courthouse of Lyon.

In 2008, the building was the subject of a comprehensive renovation (including accessibility, upgrading and security).

== Famous trials ==
There were some famous trials in the building:

- August 1884: Italian anarchist Sante Geronimo Caserio, murder of President of the Republic Sadi Carnot, was sentenced to death.
- January 1945: Charles Maurras was sentenced to life imprisonment and national degradation.
- July 1987: Klaus Barbie was sentenced to life imprisonment for crimes against humanity during the Second World War.
