= Louis-Pierre Baltard =

French architect and engraver (1764–1846)

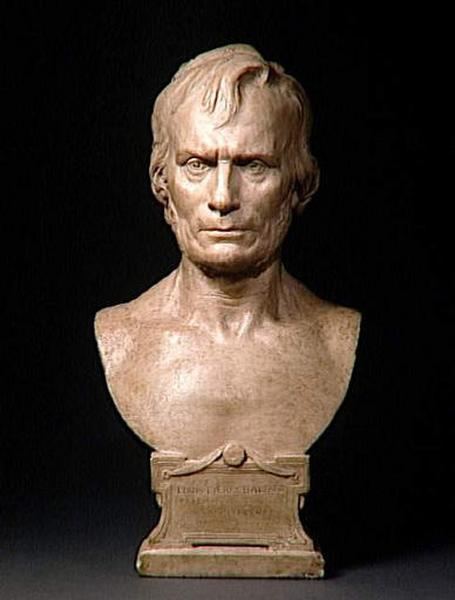
- A bust of Louis-Pierre Baltard by Eugène Guillaume (1873), courtesy of the musée d'Orsay
- Born: 9 July 1764; Paris
- Died: 22 January 1846 (aged 81); Lyon
- Occupation: Architect
- Children: Victor Baltard
- Buildings: Palais de justice historique de Lyon

Louis-Pierre Baltard (French pronunciation: [lwi pjɛʁ baltaʁ]; 9 July 1764 – 22 January 1846) was a French architect, and engraver and father of Victor Baltard.

== Life ==
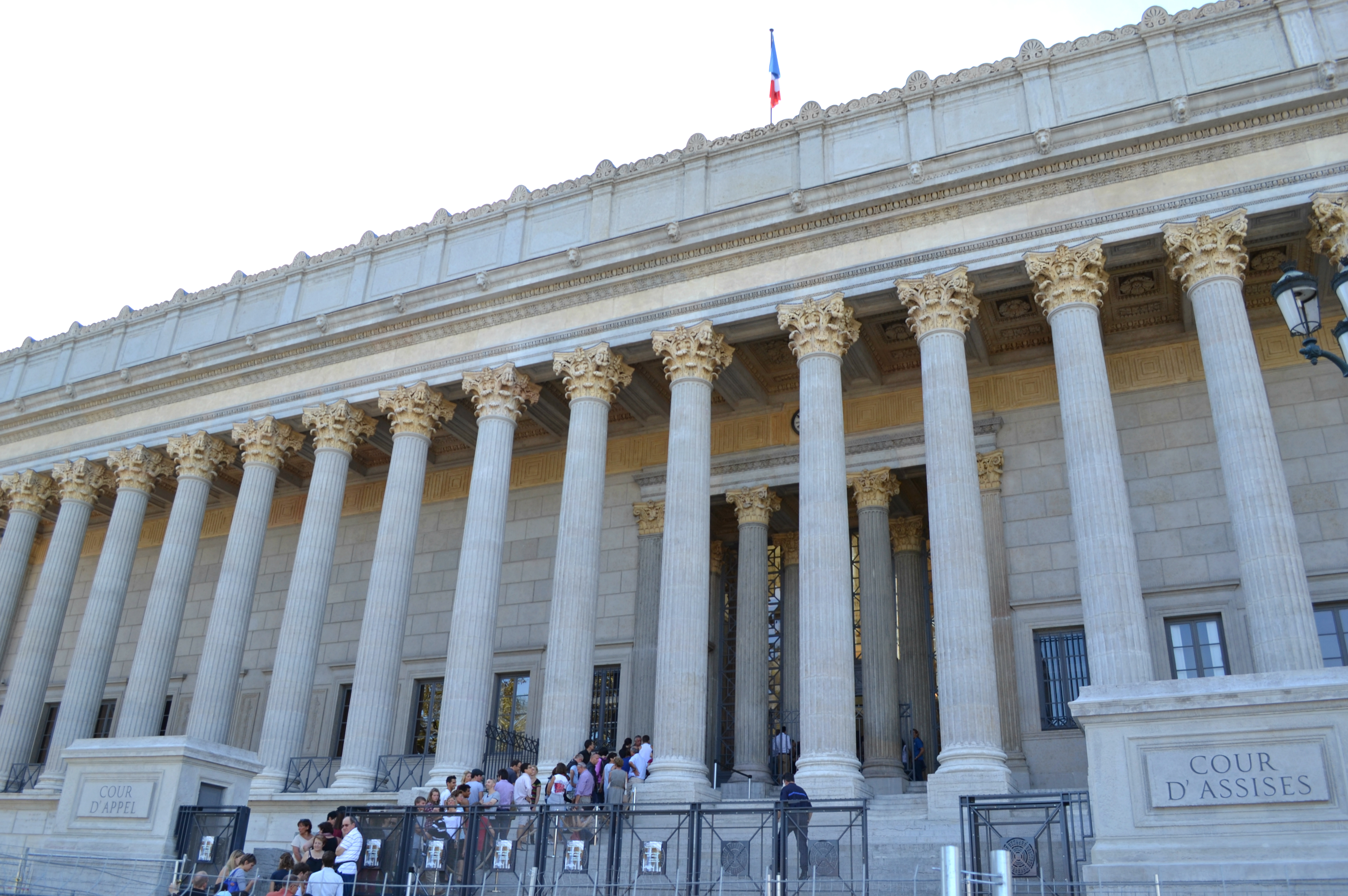
The Palais de Justice in Lyon

He was born in Paris. He was originally a landscape painter, but in his travels through Italy was struck with the beauty of the Italian buildings, and changed his profession, devoting himself to architecture.

In his new occupation he achieved great success, and was selected to prepare the plans for some of the largest public edifices in Paris. His reputation is chiefly based on his skill in engraving. Among the best known of his plates are the drawings of Paris (Paris et ses monuments, 1803), the engravings for Denon's Égypte, the illustrations of Napoleon's wars (La Colonne de la grande armée), and those contained in the series entitled the Grand prix de l'architecture, which for some time he carried on alone. He also gained distinction as an engraver of portraits.

The Palais de Justice in Lyon are his most notable project.

Baltard died, aged 81, in Lyon.

== Family ==
Two of his children were also architects. Of these the more important was Victor Baltard, who designed Les Halles, Saint-Augustin, Paris, and the facade of Notre-Dame-des-Blancs-Manteaux.

== Architectural works ==
Louis-Pierre Baltard and Jean-Baptiste Rondelet were candidates in the competition to transform the Panthéon de Paris into the « temple de la Gloire ». In 1813, on the death of Alexandre Théodore Brongniart, Baltard proposed to undertake the building of the Palais Brongniart, but was unsuccessful.

- The Palais de Justice in Lyon
- Chapel of the prison Sainte-Pélagie, Paris.
- Hospital and chapel of the prison Saint-Lazare, Paris (1834)
- Prison Saint-Joseph, Perrache Lyon (1836)
- Palais de Justice (nicknamed « Les 24 colonnes »), Lyon, on the quays of the river Saône (1842)

== See also ==
- List of works by Eugène Guillaume
