= Hans Ertl (cameraman) =

German mountaineer and Nazi propagandist

Hans Ertl (21 February 1908 – 23 October 2000) was a German mountaineer and Nazi propagandist. He is most known for being the father of Monika Ertl, the Communist guerrilla who executed Roberto Quintanilla Pereira, the man responsible for chopping off Che Guevara's hands.

== Film career ==
In 1939, while preparing to leave to shoot a film in Chile, Hans Ertl was conscripted by the Third Reich to be a "war correspondent". As a cameraman in Nazi Germany, he worked with director Leni Riefenstahl on several of her Nazi propaganda films, including Olympia. During World War II, he was among the preferred cameramen accompanying General Rommel, which earned him a reputation as "Rommel's photographer". During the early part of his career, he invented an underwater camera and a ski-mountable camera, both of which transformed the way films were shot.

In the mid-1950s, after an arrest by the Allies and being banned from working professionally in Germany, Ertl fled to Chile and finally resettled in Bolivia, where he made two feature-length "expedition film"-like documentaries. He embarked on a third but ceased after his tractor crashed through a wooden bridge with two-thirds of the uninsured exposed footage on board. Frustrated, he then decided to become a farmer and retired to La Dolorida, a piece of semi-jungle land in eastern Bolivia, where he was known as "Juan".

== Personal life ==
Ertl's first wife and mother of his three daughters died from liver cancer in 1958. His favorite daughter was Monika Ertl, with whom Ertl became upset when she decided to join the leftist ELN guerrilla movement in 1969. He refused to allow her to convert part of the farm into a military training ground. When Monika was gunned down by the Bolivian military in retribution for having allegedly helped in the 1971 assassination of Colonel Roberto Quintanilla Pereira, the Bolivian consul in Hamburg, her father was "relieved that she had gone in peace."

He was also an acquaintance of Klaus Barbie and, earlier, supposedly a lover of Riefenstahl. He rarely returned to Germany, where he felt cheated out of an important film award, but days before his death he reportedly asked his daughter Heidi, who lived in Bavaria, to send him a bag of German soil. Ertl died in 2000 and was buried on his farm, which is now a museum. In a 2008 Time article, Ertl's daughter Beatriz denied that her father was a Nazi, saying that he served out of "obligation" and that he "did what he could to survive." His daughter also stated that Riefenstahl was "the love of his life."

== Famous ascents ==
- 1930: First ascent of the Königspitze north face
- 1931: First ascent of the Ortler north face
- 1934: First ascent of Sia Kangri
- 1942: Mount Elbrus
- 1950: First solo-climb of Illimani South, first ascent of Illimani North
- 1951: Second ascent of Illampu
- 1953: Camp 5 (6900 m) on Nanga Parbat on the 1953 German–Austrian Nanga Parbat expedition, where he took the famous pictures of Hermann Buhl returning from his solo first ascent

== Works ==
- 1932: Assistant at Arnold Fanck's S.O.S. Eisberg
- 1934: Assistant at Arnold Fanck's The Eternal Dream
- 1935: Demon of the Himalayas
- 1936: Director of photography for Leni Riefenstahl's Olympia - Teil 1: Fest der Völker, Teil 2: Fest der Schönheit
- 1938: Cameraman for Luis Trenker's Liebesgrüße aus dem Engadin
- 1939: Cameraman for Arnold Fanck's A German Robinson Crusoe
- 1939: Assistant for BDM-Werk Glaube und Schönheit mit dem Film Glaube und Schönheit
- 1953: Director and cameraman of the documentary Nanga Parbat 1953

== In popular culture ==
Rodrigo Hasbún's second novel, Affections, is loosely based on Ertl's life.
