= Coco Peredo =

Bolivian revolutionist (1939–1967)

Roberto "Coco" Peredo Leigue (23 May 1939 – 27 September 1967) was a Bolivian Communist revolutionary and a contemporary of Che Guevara. His brothers Inti Peredo and Osvaldo Peredo were also militants.
