= Klaus Barbie =

German SS officer and war criminal (1913–1991)

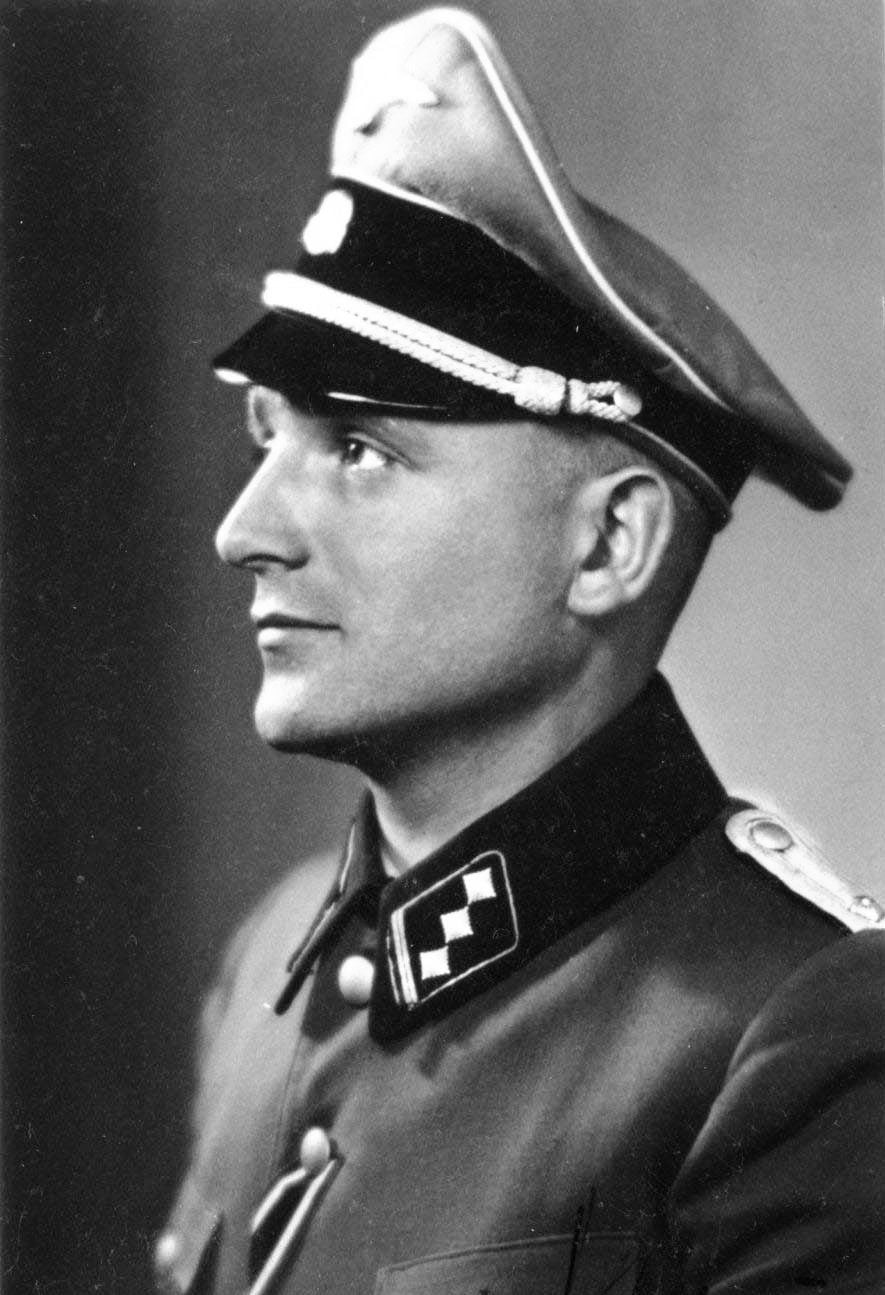
- Barbie as an SS-Obersturmführer
- Born: Nikolaus Barbie; 25 October 1913; Godesberg, Germany
- Died: 25 September 1991 (aged 77); Pierre-Bénite, France
- Other names: "Butcher of Lyon"; Klaus Altmann
- Political party: Nazi Party
- Conviction: Crimes against humanity
- Penalty: Death; commuted to life imprisonment
- Career
- Spouse: Regina Margaretta Willms (m. 1939)
- Children: 2
- Allegiance: Nazi Germany; Schutzstaffel; United States; West Germany; Bolivia
- Branch: Gestapo; Counterintelligence Corps; Federal Intelligence Service
- Service years: 1935–1945
- Rank: SS-Hauptsturmführer
- Unit: Sicherheitsdienst (SD)

Nikolaus "Klaus" Barbie (25 October 1913 – 25 September 1991) was a German officer of the Schutzstaffel and Sicherheitsdienst and a convicted war criminal. He worked in Vichy France during World War II. He became known as the "Butcher of Lyon" for having personally tortured prisoners—primarily Jews and members of the French Resistance—as the head of the Gestapo in Lyon.

After the war, United States intelligence services employed him for his anti-communist efforts and aided his escape to Bolivia, where he advised the dictatorial regime on how to repress opposition through torture. In 1983, the United States apologised to France for the U.S. Counterintelligence Corps helping him escape to Bolivia to avoid an outstanding arrest warrant.

In 1951, he immigrated to Bolivia. While he was in Bolivia, the West German Intelligence Service recruited him. Barbie is suspected of having had a role in the Bolivian coup d'état orchestrated by Luis García Meza in 1980. After the fall of the dictatorship, Barbie lost the protection of the government in La Paz.

In 1983, he was arrested and extradited to France, where he was convicted of crimes against humanity and sentenced to life in prison. Although he had been sentenced to death in absentia twice earlier, in 1947 and 1954, capital punishment had been abolished in France in 1981.

Barbie died of cancer in 1991, at age 77, in his Lyon prison cell.

== Early life and education ==
Nikolaus Barbie was born on 25 October 1913 in Godesberg, which is today part of Bonn. The Barbie family came from Merzig, in the Saar near the border with France. In 1914, his father, also named Nikolaus, was conscripted to fight in the First World War. He was wounded in the neck at Verdun and captured by the French, and he never recovered his health. Until 1923, when he was 10, Klaus Barbie attended the local school where his father taught. Afterwards, he attended a boarding school in Trier. In 1925, the entire Barbie family moved to Trier.

In June 1933, Barbie's younger brother Kurt died, at the age of 18, of a chronic illness. Later that year, their father also died. The death of his father derailed plans for the 20-year-old Barbie to study theology. While unemployed, Barbie was conscripted into the Reich Labour Service. On 26 September 1935, aged 22, he joined the Schutzstaffel (SS) as member 272,284, and began working in the Sicherheitsdienst (SD), the SS security service, which acted as the intelligence-gathering arm of the Nazi Party. On 1 May 1937, he became member 4,583,085 of the Nazi Party.

== Second World War ==
After the German conquest and occupation of the Netherlands, Barbie was assigned to Amsterdam. He had been pre-assigned to Adolf Eichmann's Amt (Department) IV/B-4. This department was responsible for the identification, roundup, and deportation of Dutch Communists, Jews and Freemasons. On 11 October 1940, Barbie arrested Hermannus van Tongeren, Grand Master of the Grand Orient of the Netherlands. In March 1941, van Tongeren was transported to Sachsenhausen concentration camp where, in freezing conditions, he died two weeks later. On 1 April, Barbie summoned van Tongeren's daughter, Charlotte, to SD headquarters and informed her that her father had died of an infection in both ears and had been cremated.

In 1942, he was sent to Dijon, in the Occupied Zone of France. In November of the same year, at the age of 29, he was assigned to Lyon as the head of the local Gestapo. He established his headquarters at the Hôtel Terminus in Lyon, where he personally tortured adult and child prisoners. He became known as the "Butcher of Lyon".

The daughter of a French Resistance leader based in Lyon said her father was beaten and his skin torn, and that his head was immersed in buckets of ammonia and cold water; he could not sit or stand and died three days later from burns to his skin. Other tortures included training German shepherd dogs to bite and using them to rape naked women.

It has been estimated that Barbie was directly responsible for the deportation of up to 14,000 Jews and resistance fighters, personally participating in roundups such as the Rue Sainte-Catherine Roundup, which saw 84 people arrested in a single day. He arrested Jean Moulin, a high-ranking member of the French Resistance and his most prominent captive. He personally tortured him to death. In 1943, he was awarded the Iron Cross (First Class) by Adolf Hitler for his campaign against the French Resistance and the capture of Moulin.

In April 1944, Barbie ordered the deportation to Auschwitz of a group of 44 Jewish children from an orphanage at Izieu. He then rejoined the SiPo-SD of Lyon in its retreat to Bruyères, where he led an anti-partisan attack in Rehaupal in September 1944.

== Postwar period ==
=== US intelligence work in postwar Europe ===
In 1947, Barbie was recruited as an agent for the 66th Detachment of the US Army Counterintelligence Corps (CIC) along with a Serbian agent of the Belgrade special police and SD, Radislav Grujičić. The US used Barbie and other Nazi Party members to further anti-communist efforts in Europe. Specifically, they were interested in British interrogation techniques which Barbie had experienced firsthand, as well as the identities of former SS officers British intelligence agencies might be interested in recruiting. Later, the CIC housed him in a hotel in Memmingen; he reported on French intelligence activities in the French zone of occupied Germany because they suspected that the French had been infiltrated by the KGB and GPU.

The US Department of Justice report to the US Senate in 1983 opens with the summary paragraph:

As the investigation of Klaus Barbie has shown, officers of the United States government were directly responsible for protecting a person wanted by the government of France on criminal charges and in arranging his escape from the law. As a direct result of that action, Klaus Barbie did not stand trial in France in 1950; he spent 33 years as a free man and a fugitive from justice.

The French discovered that Barbie was in US hands; having sentenced him to death in absentia for war crimes, they made a plea to John J. McCloy, US High Commissioner for Germany, to hand him over for execution, but McCloy refused. Instead, the CIC helped him flee to Bolivia assisted by "ratlines" organised by US intelligence services, as well as by Croatian Roman Catholic clergy, including Krunoslav Draganović. The CIC asserted that Barbie knew too much about the network of German spies the CIC had planted in various European communist organisations. It was suspicious of communist influence within the Government of France, but their protection of Barbie may have been as much to avoid the embarrassment of having recruited him in the first place. Other authors have suggested that the anticommunist element of Italian fascism and the protection of the Vatican allowed Klaus Barbie and other Nazis to flee to Bolivia.

In 1965, Barbie was recruited by the West German foreign intelligence agency Bundesnachrichtendienst (BND), under the codename "Adler" (German for 'Eagle') and the registration number V-43118. His initial monthly salary of 500 Deutsche Marks was transferred in May 1966 to an account of the Chartered Bank of London in San Francisco. During his time with the BND, Barbie made at least 35 reports to the BND headquarters in Pullach.

=== Bolivia ===
Barbie emigrated to Bolivia in 1951, where he lived well for 30 years in Cochabamba, under the alias Klaus Altmann. It was easier and less embarrassing for him to find employment there than in Europe; he enjoyed excellent relations with high-ranking Bolivian officials, including Bolivian dictators Hugo Banzer and Luis García Meza. "Altmann" was known for his German nationalist and anti-communist stances. While engaged in arms-trade operations in Bolivia, he was appointed to the rank of lieutenant colonel within the Bolivian Armed Forces.

Barbie collaborated with René Barrientos's regime, including teaching the general's private paramilitaries named "Furmont" how torture can best be used. The regime's political repression against leftist groups was helped by Barbie's knowledge about intelligence work, torture and interrogations. In 1972 under General Banzer (with whom Barbie collaborated even more openly), he assisted in illegal arrests, interrogations and murders of opposition and progressive groups. Journalists and activists who wrote or spoke about the regime's crimes against human rights were arrested and many fell victim to so-called "disappearances", the state's secret murders and abductions of leftists. Barbie actively participated in the regime's oppression of opponents.

Barbie was strongly linked to the neo-Nazi paramilitary member Álvaro de Castro, who was his personally hired bodyguard and the two participated in criminal actions and businesses together. De Castro had connections with powerful drug barons and the illegal drug trade and, together with Barbie (under the name Altmann) and an Austrian company, sold weapons to the drug cartels. When De Castro was arrested he admitted in interviews that he had earlier worked for drug lords in the country. Other sources say Barbie most likely also had connections with these organizations.

Initially, he worked for Roberto Suárez Gómez who eventually introduced him to Colombian traffickers. Barbie met with Pablo Escobar and several other high ranking members of the Medellín cartel in the late 1970s, and agreed to arrange for security of Escobar's raw coca supply, from its cultivation until it reached processing plants in Colombia. In exchange, Escobar agreed to fund Barbie's anti-communist activities.

De Castro continued to correspond with Barbie when Barbie was later under arrest. Their connections also provided intelligence information to U.S. authorities at the U.S. Embassy. A group called "The Fiancés of Death", which included German Nazis and Fascists, had links to some of Barbie's actions in Bolivia. Barbie earlier also carried out a large arms purchase of tanks from Austria to the Bolivian army. These were then used in a coup d'état.

According to various reports, after the emergence of Che Guevara in Bolivia in 1966, Barbie's anti-partisan skills were in demand again, and he worked for the Bolivian Interior Ministry with the rank of lieutenant as an instructor and adviser to the security forces. During an interview for the 2007 documentary film My Enemy's Enemy, journalist Kai Hermann told the film-makers that Barbie constantly "boasted that it was he who devised the strategy for murdering Che Guevara".

People who met Barbie during his time in Bolivia have said that he was a firm and fanatical believer in the Nazi ideology and an anti-Semite. Barbie and De Castro reportedly talked about the cases and searches for Josef Mengele and Adolf Eichmann, whom Barbie supported and wanted to assist in remaining on the run.

In 1973, Monika Ertl, daughter of Nazi propagandist Hans Ertl and a communist militant who assassinated Bolivian intelligence director Roberto Quintanilla, had planned to abduct Barbie and extradite him to France before being killed by Bolivian police.

=== Manhunt ===
Barbie's Bolivian secret police ID card, named as "Klaus Altmann Hansen"

Barbie was identified as being in Peru in 1971 by Serge and Beate Klarsfeld (Nazi hunters from France), who came across a secret document that revealed his alias. Barbie was living at Malecon 200, Chaclacayo (11°57′26.3″S 76°43′45.2″W) a property owned by SS-Sturmbannführer Friedrich Schwend. On 19 January 1972, this information was published in the French newspaper L'Aurore, along with a photograph of Altmann which the Klarsfelds obtained from a German expatriate living in Lima, Peru.

There, Barbie provided security services to the junta of General Juan Velasco Alvarado following the military coup of 3 October 1968, including surveillance of the U.S. diplomatic mission led by John Irwin in March 1969.

Led by Beate Klarsfeld, French journalist Ladislas de Hoyos and cameraman Christian van Ryswyck flew to La Paz in January 1972 in order to find and interview Barbie posing as his alias, Klaus Altmann. The interview took place on 3 February 1972 in the Department of the Interior building and the following day in prison, where Barbie was placed under protection by the Bolivian authorities.

Barbie told de Hoyos that he did not know French and agreed to take questions in German or Spanish. Part way through the interview, de Hoyos asked him in French whether he had ever been to Lyon; Barbie quickly responded in German that he had not. De Hoyos then handed him photographs of Resistance members he had tortured, asking if he recognized them. He denied this as well, unaware that the question was a ruse to get his fingerprints. Upon finishing the interview, with Barbie's Bolivian minders clearly annoyed, de Hoyos took his film and the photographs directly to the French embassy for shipment in a diplomatic bag. When the interview was later broadcast on Antenne 2, Resistance member Simone Lagrange recognized Barbie, who had tortured her in 1944.

The testimony of Italian insurgent Stefano Delle Chiaie before the Italian Parliamentary Commission on Terrorism suggests that Barbie took part in the 1980 "cocaine coup" that saw Luis García Meza's regime, backed by drug lord Roberto Suárez Gómez, force its way to power in Bolivia.

== Extradition, trial, and death ==
In February 1983, the newly elected democratic regime of Hernán Siles Zuazo arrested Barbie in La Paz on the pretext of his owing the government US$10,000 for goods he was supposed to have delivered but did not. A few days later, the government delivered him to France to stand trial.

Shortly after Barbie's extradition, evidence emerged that Barbie had worked for U.S. intelligence in Germany and that U.S. agents may have been instrumental in Barbie's flight to Bolivia to escape prosecution in France. Allan Ryan, Director of the Office of Special Investigations (OSI) of the U.S. Justice Department, recommended to U.S. Attorney General William French Smith that the matter be investigated. Following a lengthy investigation and a full report that was released to the public, Ryan concluded that "officers of the United States government were directly responsible for protecting a person wanted by the government of France on criminal charges and in arranging his escape from the law."

Ryan felt that the initial decision by the U.S. government to use Barbie during Cold War counter-intelligence work, while reprehensible in light of his war crimes, might be defended on national security interest grounds. Doing so was no different from what other World War II victor nations were doing at the time; it appeared to have been done without any U.S. Counter Intelligence Corps (CIC) knowledge of Barbie's atrocities in Lyon. After those atrocities became well publicised, however, Ryan regarded it as indefensible for CIC personnel to lie to higher U.S. authorities and help Barbie escape Europe to Bolivia rather than honour an outstanding French warrant for his arrest. As a result of Ryan's report and personal recommendation, the U.S. government made a formal apology to France for enabling Barbie to escape French justice for 33 years.

In 1984, Barbie was indicted for crimes committed as Gestapo chief in Lyon between 1942 and 1944, chief among which was the Rue Sainte-Catherine Roundup. The jury trial started on 11 May 1987 in Lyon before the Rhône Cour d'Assises. The head prosecutor was Pierre Truche. One witness at the trial was Michel Thomas, a Polish polyglot Jew, who had narrowly escaped arrest by Barbie in Lyon during World War II.

Barbie's defence was funded by Swiss pro-Nazi financier François Genoud and led by attorney Jacques Vergès. Barbie was tried on 41 separate counts of crimes against humanity. The father of French Minister for Justice Robert Badinter had died in Sobibor after being deported from Lyon during Barbie's tenure.

Barbie gave his name as Klaus Altmann, the name that he used while in Bolivia. He claimed that his extradition was technically illegal and asked to be excused from the trial and returned to his cell at Prison Saint-Paul. This was granted. He was brought back to court on 26 May 1987 to face some of his accusers, about whose testimony he had "nothing to say".

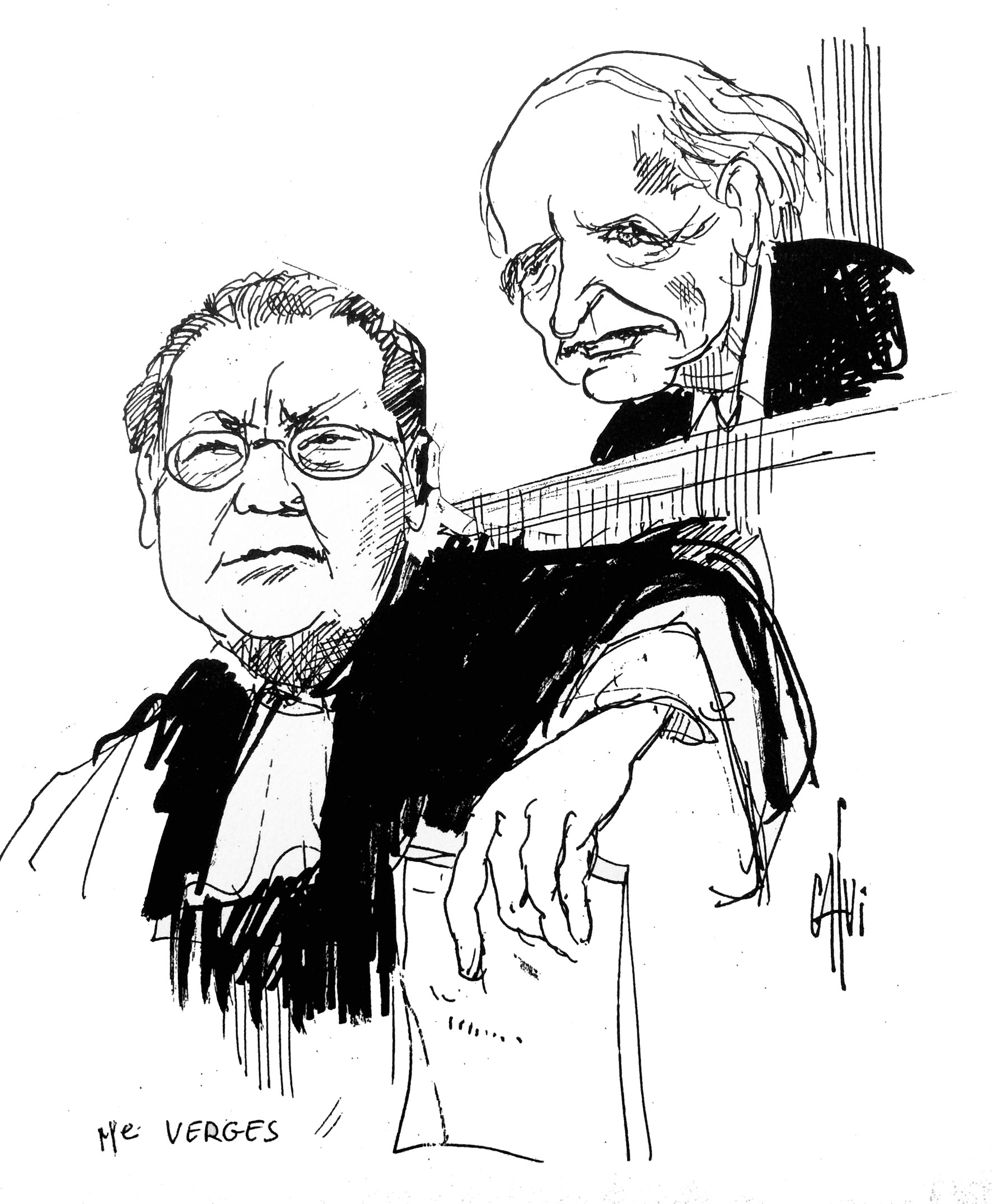
Caricature of Vergès and Klaus Barbie during the trial, by Calvi

Barbie's defence lawyer, Jacques Vergès, had a reputation for attacking the French political system, particularly in the historic French colonial empire. His strategy was to use the trial to talk about war crimes committed by France since 1945. He got the prosecution to drop some of the charges against Barbie due to French legislation that had protected French citizens accused of the same crimes under the Vichy regime and in French Algeria. Vergès argued that Barbie's actions were no worse than the supposedly ordinary actions of colonialists worldwide, and that his trial was tantamount to selective prosecution. Barbie's final statement, spoken in French, was: "I never committed the roundup in Izieu. . . . I fought the Resistance, which I respect, with toughness but that was war, and the war is over."

The court rejected the defence's argument, and on 4 July 1987, Barbie was convicted and sentenced to life imprisonment. He died in prison in Lyon (of leukemia and prostate cancer) four years later, at the age of 77. His ashes were claimed by his daughter, who repatriated them to Austria.

== Personal life ==
In April 1939, Barbie became engaged to Regina Margaretta Willms, the 23-year-old daughter of a postal clerk; they had two children, a son named Klaus-Georg Altmann and a daughter named Ute Messner.

In 1983, Françoise Croizier, Klaus Barbie's French daughter-in-law, said in an interview that the CIA kidnapped Klaus-Georg in 1946 to make sure that his father carried out intelligence missions for the agency. Croizier met Klaus-Georg while both were students in Paris; they married in 1968, had three children and lived in Europe and Bolivia using the surname "Altmann". Croizier said that when she married, she did not know who her father-in-law was, but that she could guess the reasons for a German to settle in South America after the war. Klaus-Georg died in a hang-gliding accident in 1981.

== In popular culture ==
Film

- The 1988 American documentary film Hotel Terminus: The Life and Times of Klaus Barbie, directed by the German-French director Marcel Ophuls, details Barbie's life between childhood and the trial near the end of his life.
- In the 1997 film Lucie Aubrac, Klaus Barbie is portrayed by Heino Ferch.
- The British–French documentary film My Enemy's Enemy (French: Mon Meilleur Ennemi) is the story of Klaus Barbie, following him through World War II and post-war hiding journey in Bolivia. It depicts his involvement in the assassination of Che Guevara. It also discusses his French trial for war crimes committed in Lyon, such as the torture of Jean Moulin.
- Barbie is played by Marc Rissmann in the 2019 movie A Call to Spy, which is about female Allied spies in WWII.
- Barbie is portrayed by Matthias Schweighöfer in the 2020 film Resistance, which is a free adaptation of the experiences of the French mime Marcel Marceau during World War II, when he helped to save Jewish children from deportation to Nazi Germany as a member of the Jewish resistance. Barbie is the main antagonist as the group operates within Lyon.
- Barbie is portrayed by Fabian Baecker in the 2024 Dutch TV series De Joodse Raad ("The Jewish Council").
- Barbie is portrayed by Nikolas Pajic in the 2024 short film, "The Ice Cream Man".

Fiction

- Klaus Barbie is featured in GS Carberry's novel In the Shadow of Monsters, set in World War II about the fictional character Niki Frolov and the French Resistance."

== See also ==
- Operation Condor
- Operation Bloodstone
- Glossary of Nazi Germany
- List of Nazi Party leaders and officials
- Alice Vansteenberghe
- Lise Lesèvre
- Jacques Vergès
