= Rue Sainte-Catherine (Lyon) =

Thoroughfare in Lyon, France

Coordinates: 45°46′05″N 4°49′59″E

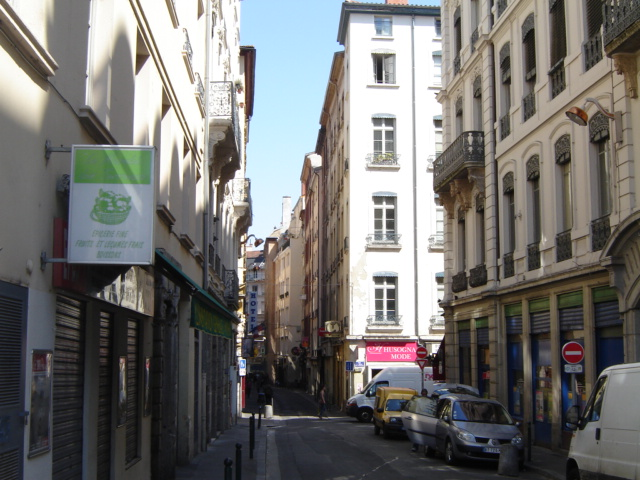
- Interactive map of Rue Sainte-Catherine
- Former name(s): Rue de la Fontaine; Rue de la Commission temporaire
- Location: 1st arrondissement of Lyon, Lyon, France
- Postal code: 69001

Construction
- Construction start: 17th century

The Rue Sainte-Catherine (French pronunciation: [ʁy sɛ̃t katʁin]) is a very old street at the foot of the slopes of La Croix-Rousse quarter, in the 1st arrondissement of Lyon. It is particularly known for being a drinking street. The street belongs to the zone classified as World Heritage Site by UNESCO.

== Location ==
The Rue Sainte-Catherine has an east-west axis and is parallel of the Place des Terreaux, and therefore is in the historic center of Lyon, overlooking the Hôtel de Ville of the 1st arrondissement. This situation is relatively unusual because it is quite rare for a street with a bad reputation to be as close to the City Hall of a big city, to the richest shopping areas (Rue Édouard-Herriot, Rue de la République...), to the Opera Nouvel and to the Museum of Fine Arts of Lyon : this is a paradox indeed very representative of the spirit of the slopes of the Croix-Rousse quarter, which the last "flat" street before the slopes, the Rue Sainte-Catherine, is the natural boundary, geographic alter ego of the Boulevard de la Croix-Rousse.

== History ==
The street was first named Rue de la Fontaine in the sixteenth century, as a source belonging to the Hospice de la Charité provided drinking water to the entire neighborhood, then Rue de la Commission temporaire after 1793.

In 1680, a street and a place named Sainte-Catherine are attested, named after a treatment facility for orphans located on this square. There was indeed a hospital named St. Catherine Hospital, later replaced by the Adopted Daughters of Charity. The name of the street refers to St. Catherine of Alexandria, a saint much worshipped in the Middle Ages who died in 307 as martyr under Maximinus. The hospital was later occupied by the Duparc house.

The house named Le Dauphin, at No. 1, was owned by the Duke of Villeroy. In 1780, an ancient altar was found in the Hôtel des Quatre Nations, at No. 5, belonging to Jacques Imbert Colomès. At No. 9 to 13, the villa owned by Governor Philippianus had a household altar. The first silk mill in France was established in the street.

At the corner of the Rue d'Algérie and the Rue Saint-Marie-des-Terreaux, a statue of Catherine of Alexandria, carved in 1866 by Joseph-Hughes Fabisch to replace a seventeenth-century work by Bridant, also recalls the memory of this hospital which depends the Hôpital de la Charité de Lyon. Over the centuries, several names were used (Marché du Fillet, Place du Fil, Place Neuve-des-Carmes, Rue du Forès) and another Rue Sainte-Catherine is attested in 1831 in the 4th arrondissement (the current Rue Saint-Charles-Francois-Lebrun). There was also a small Rue Sainte-Catherine and a Grande Rue Sainte-Catherine. On 4 August 1854, the Petite Rue Sainte-Catherine became the Rue Jean-François-Terme and the current Rue Sainte-Catherine took its final name. The Place Sainte-Catherine was then included in the street of the same name. The No. 5 was, in 1868, the headquarters of the Fanfare Lyonnaise, led by Joseph Luigini. On 9 February 1943, the Germans arrested 86 people at the headquarters of the Union Générale des Juifs de France at No. 12 during the events of the Rue Sainte-Catherine Roundup.

Following the more restrictive measures taken by local authorities and the recent decision to renovate the neighborhood slopes (passage Thiaffait, montée de la Grande Côte...), it seems that the atmosphere of the Rue Sainte-Catherine tends to evolve gradually to a relative calm and gentrification, since many bars are now closed and some of them are replaced by respectable pubs for middle-class youth, including the Shamrock. In addition, the inhabitants of the street complained about the presence of dealers.

== Architecture and description ==
The street is short and wide to the west with a white building at No. 2, built around 1850. In the northern side, there are two big five-floor houses. After the No. 7, a Madonna and Child the street is more narrow and curved. The three to five-floor houses are old whose simple facades display some sculpted doors and archways.

The street is famous for its many bars, since its central position made it able to drain a large population which come from the Croix-Rousse as well as from the Presqu'île, from Saint-Jean and Saint-Paul quarters (by the bridge La Feuillée) and from the 6th arrondissement by the bridge Morand. The metro station "Hôtel de Ville" is served by A and C lines, and there are many buses until quite late, allowing the Rue Sainte-Catherine to be much more active on night, and often even completely congested with people in the middle of the night. The street remains famous for its many bars and pubs surrounded with kebabs and groceries shops. It is also known for its popular and festive atmosphere. There are also a mixed sauna and an hotel.

== Traboules ==
There are several traboules in the street:

- Nos. 2, 4 : This traboule is closed but can be seen. It begins with a building of the Second Empire.
- No. 10 : This traboule is closed but can be seen, and includes an alley with a "very original" opened grid.
- No. 12 : This open traboule is composed of old houses, and there is a commemorative plaque for Jews during the Second World War.
- No. 18 : This curved and closed traboule starts with a simple building, then a narrow path.
- No. 20 : This blocked up traboule contains a restored courtyard and a staircase with wrought-iron railings.
