= Osvaldo Peredo =

Bolivian communist militant and physician (1941–2021)

Osvaldo Peredo Leigue (also Osvaldo Peredo Leigh, nom de guerre: Chato) (1941 – 12 January 2021) was a Bolivian communist militant and physician. He lived in Santa Cruz de la Sierra, Bolivia, where he was an alderman on the Municipal Council of Santa Cruz de la Sierra.

== Biography ==
Peredo was born and grew up in Trinidad in Beni Department in northern Bolivia, and was strongly influenced by his older brothers Inti Peredo and Coco Peredo who helped found the Bolivian Communist Party and were leaders in guerrilla movements. After receiving his initial medical training Peredo left the profession and joined the Ñancahuazú Guerrilla movement of Che Guevara, known as the National Liberation Army (ELN). However, because of the need for medical services, Peredo left to attend Patrice Lumumba University in Moscow where he received advanced medical training as well as ideological training. Upon his return to Bolivia he became one of the leaders of the movement. After Che Guevara was killed, Peredo was among those few who managed to escape to Chile. In November 1970, Salvador Allende, after he assumed the presidency of Chile, pardoned Peredo, Mario Suarez and the other survivors.

While practicing medicine as a guerrilla, Peredo developed his use of hypnotism as a therapy, both for the control of pain and for psychological trauma. He developed a hypothesis somewhat similar to L. Ron Hubbard's engram theory in Dianetics, namely that past painful memories were the source of some current illness.

In 1997 Peredo joined Movement for Socialism – Political Instrument for the Sovereignty of the Peoples (MAS) and actively worked for the election of Evo Morales. In 2006, Peredo was elected as an alderman on the Municipal Council of Santa Cruz de la Sierra. But by 2015 he had become disenchanted with the MAS party saying that "right-wing" elements in the party were subverting the party's mission of progressive change. In 2020, Peredo rejoined the MAS party. On 12 January 2021, Peredo died from medical complications at age 79.
