= Pierre Truche =

French magistrate (1929–2020)

- Born: 1 November 1929; Lyon, France
- Died: 21 March 2020 (aged 90); Lyon, France
- Occupation: Magistrate

Pierre Truche (1 November 1929 – 21 March 2020) was a French magistrate. He notably prosecuted Klaus Barbie during his trial in 1987.

== Biography ==
Truche began his judicial career as a deputy judge in Dijon. He later worked in Arras and Lyon. He presided over the Club Cinq-Sept fire cases in 1972 and Lyon's false invoices in 1974.

He served as director of studies at the French National School for the Judiciary from 1977 to 1978 before serving on the Court of Appeal of Grenoble until 1982. He then worked as Prosecutor in Marseille, Lyon, and in the Court of Appeal of Paris. From 1992 to 1996, he worked as Prosecutor General at the Court of Cassation, and from 1996 to 1999, he served as President of the court.

Truche was the first President of the Association française pour l'histoire de la justice. He was a member of the Syndicat de la magistrature.

Pierre Truche died of cancer on 21 March 2020 at the age of 90.

== Decorations ==
- Grand Cross of the Legion of Honour (2016)

== Works ==
- L'Anarchiste et son juge (1994)
- Juger, être jugé : le Magistrat face aux autres et à lui-même (2001)
