= Inti Peredo =

Bolivian politician (1937–1969)

Guido Alvaro "Inti" Peredo Leigue (30 April 1937 – 9 September 1969) was a Bolivian Communist revolutionary and a contemporary of Che Guevara. His brothers Coco Peredo and Osvaldo Peredo were also militants.
