= Prison Saint-Paul =

Former prison building in Lyon, France

Coordinates: 45.7466°N 4.8264°E

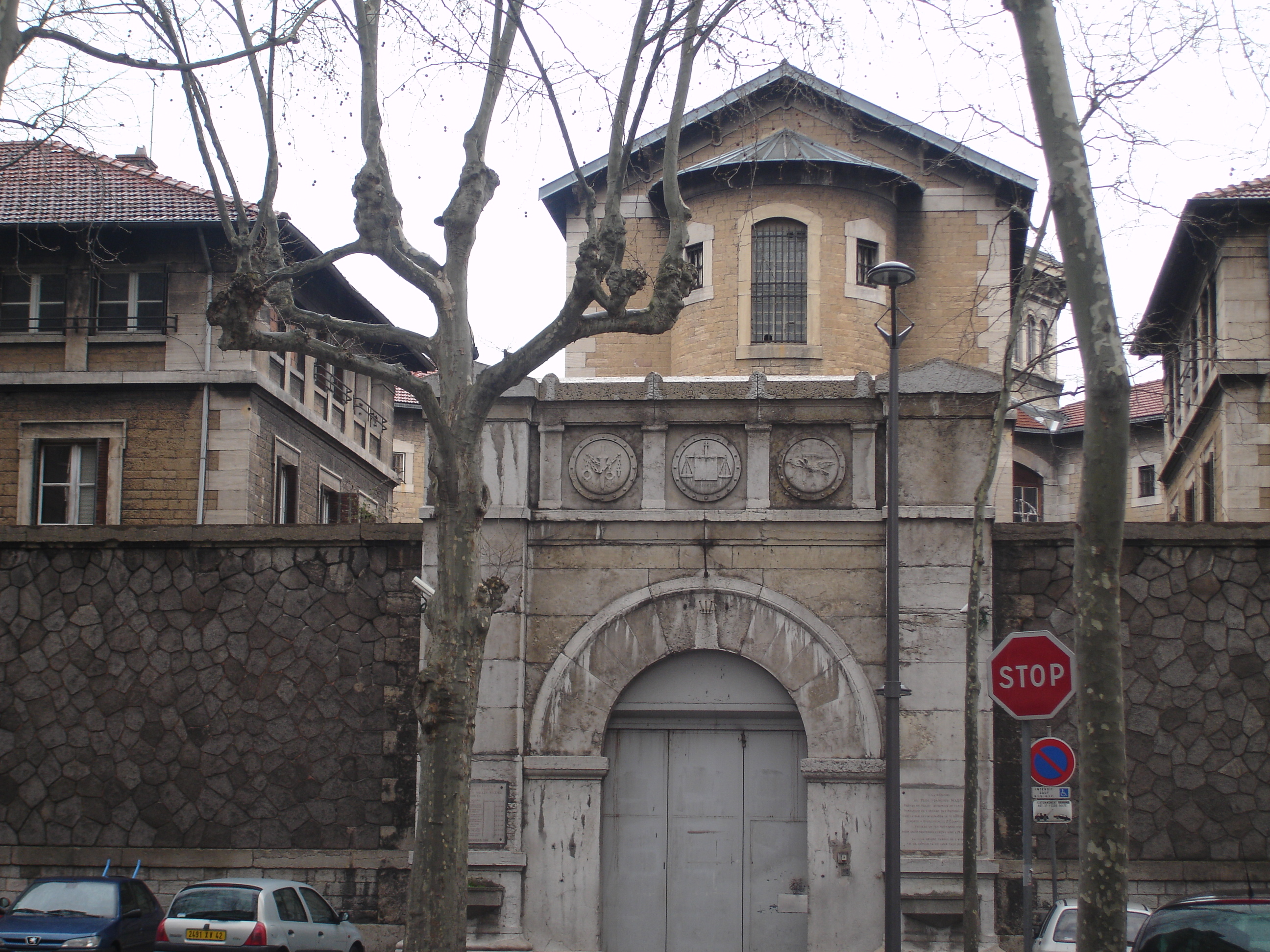
- Entrance of the prison on Cours Suchet
- Interactive map of the Prison Saint-Paul area

General information
- Location: 2nd arrondissement of Lyon, Lyon, France
- Construction started: 1860
- Completed: 1865

Design and construction
- Architects: Louis-Pierre Baltard, Antonin Louvier

Prison Saint-Paul, alternatively named Prison Saint-Paul - Saint-Joseph, was the maison d'arrêt of Lyon, France, located at 33 Cours Suchet in the Confluence quarter, 2nd arrondissement, just south of the Gare de Lyon-Perrache.

The building, deemed too obsolete to continue in its purpose, became the subject of a real estate project from its closure in 2009. All prisoners were moved to the new prison of Corbas; the Catholic University of Lyon refurbished the site to open in 2015 a campus in the former prison.

== History ==
Work on Prison Saint-Joseph across the street started in 1827.

In 1847, the decision was made to construct a facility that could house 550 prisoners divided into seven districts. Built under the direction of architect Louis-Pierre Baltard, its plans were drawn by Antonin Louvier in 1860. The location was chosen in 1859 by the Prefect of Rhône Claude-Marius Vaïsse and approved by the General Council of Rhône. The walls were made of rubble from Couzon and Saint-Martin.

In 1984, a scheduled expansion of the prison on Rue Delandine was rejected by Mayor Francisque Collomb.

In February 2009, a suicide in the prison was recounted in the media. A song written by a Lyon band named My Dragon, entitled "Les Cafards", criticised prison overcrowding.

On 3 May 2009, all remaining prisoners were transferred to a new establishment, located in Corbas.

Following the removal of prisoners, the future of the buildings remained uncertain. Located in the north of the Confluence quarter, both prisons were the subject of multiple projects, but became threatened with destruction. In March 2009, an association campaigned in favour of the protection of the buildings, deeming they had a high patrimonial value, and therefore proposed until 31 December 2009 to sign a petition to fight their proposed destruction.

A project by the private Catholic University of Lyon to open a 5,000-student campus in the former Prison Saint-Paul won the renewal competition. The refurbished buildings opened in 2015.

== Gallery ==
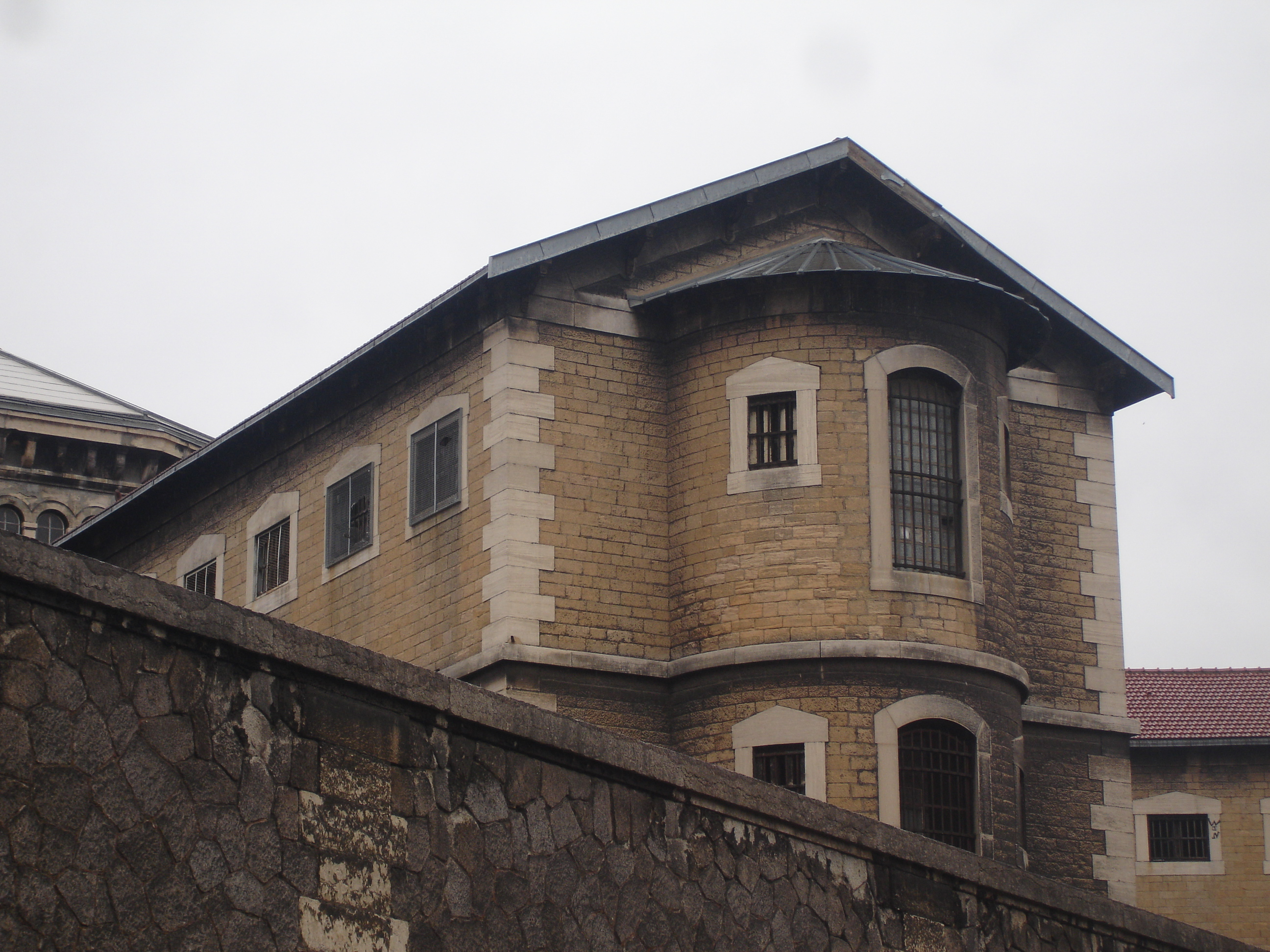
View from Rue Delandine

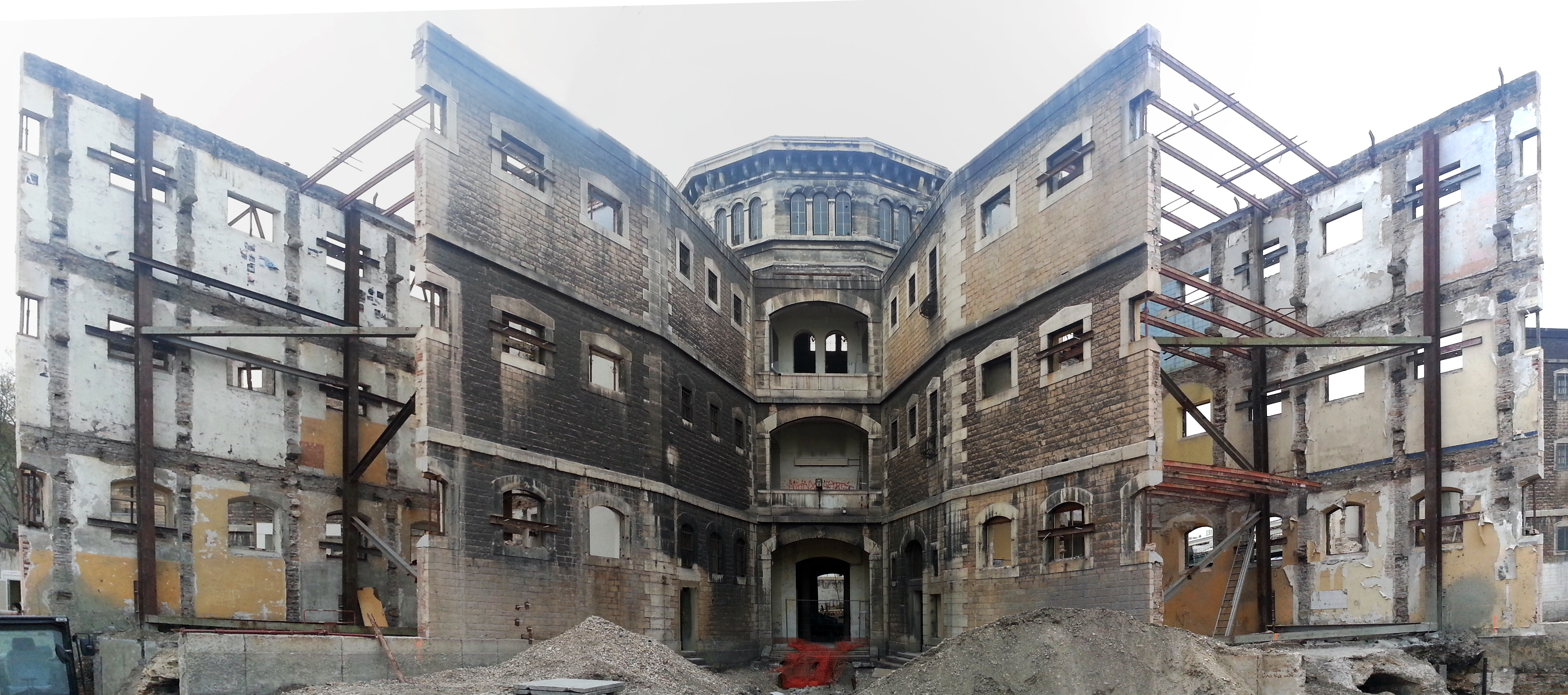
View from Rue Delandine

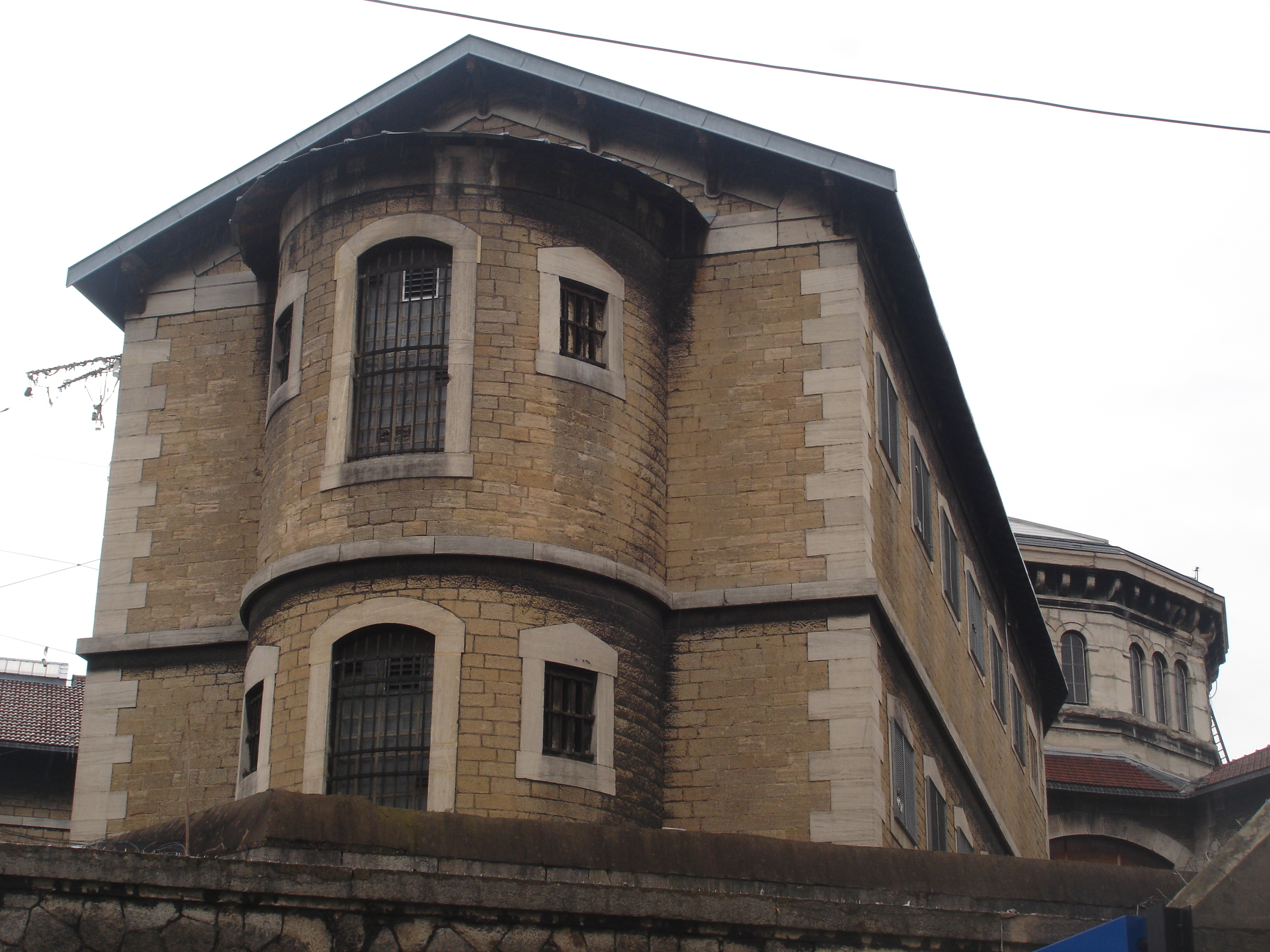
View from Cours Suchet

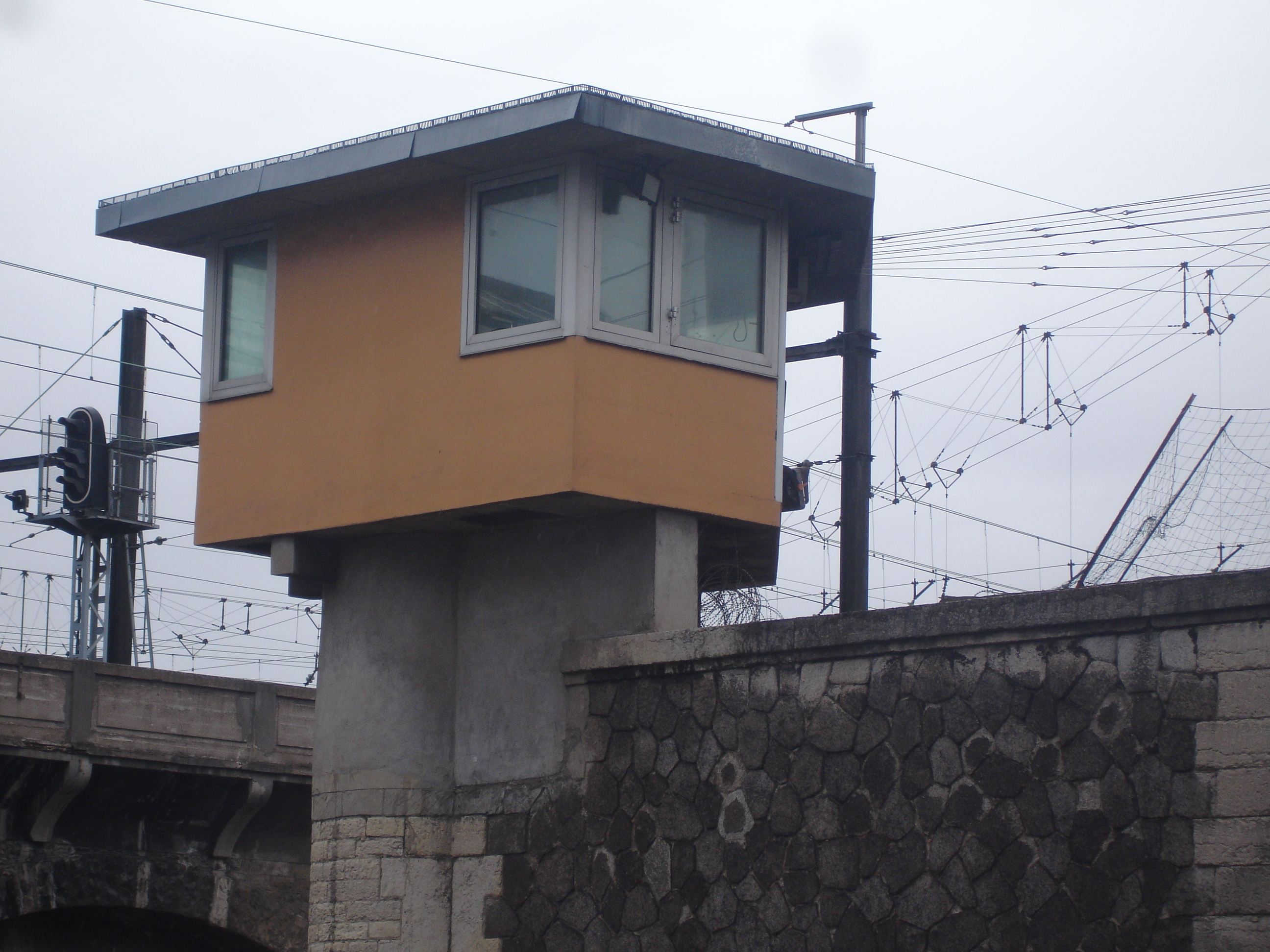
Watchtower

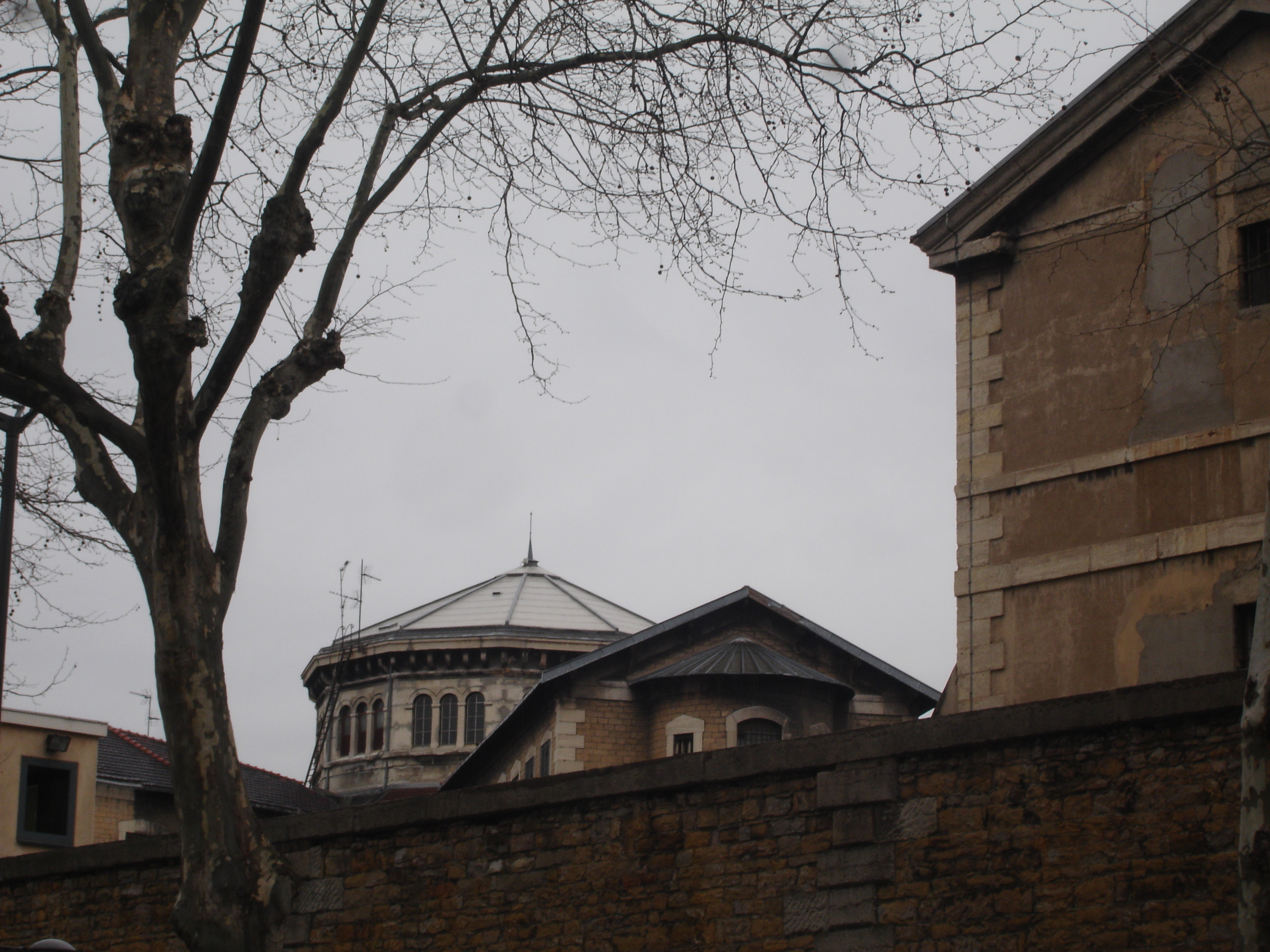
Wall and roof

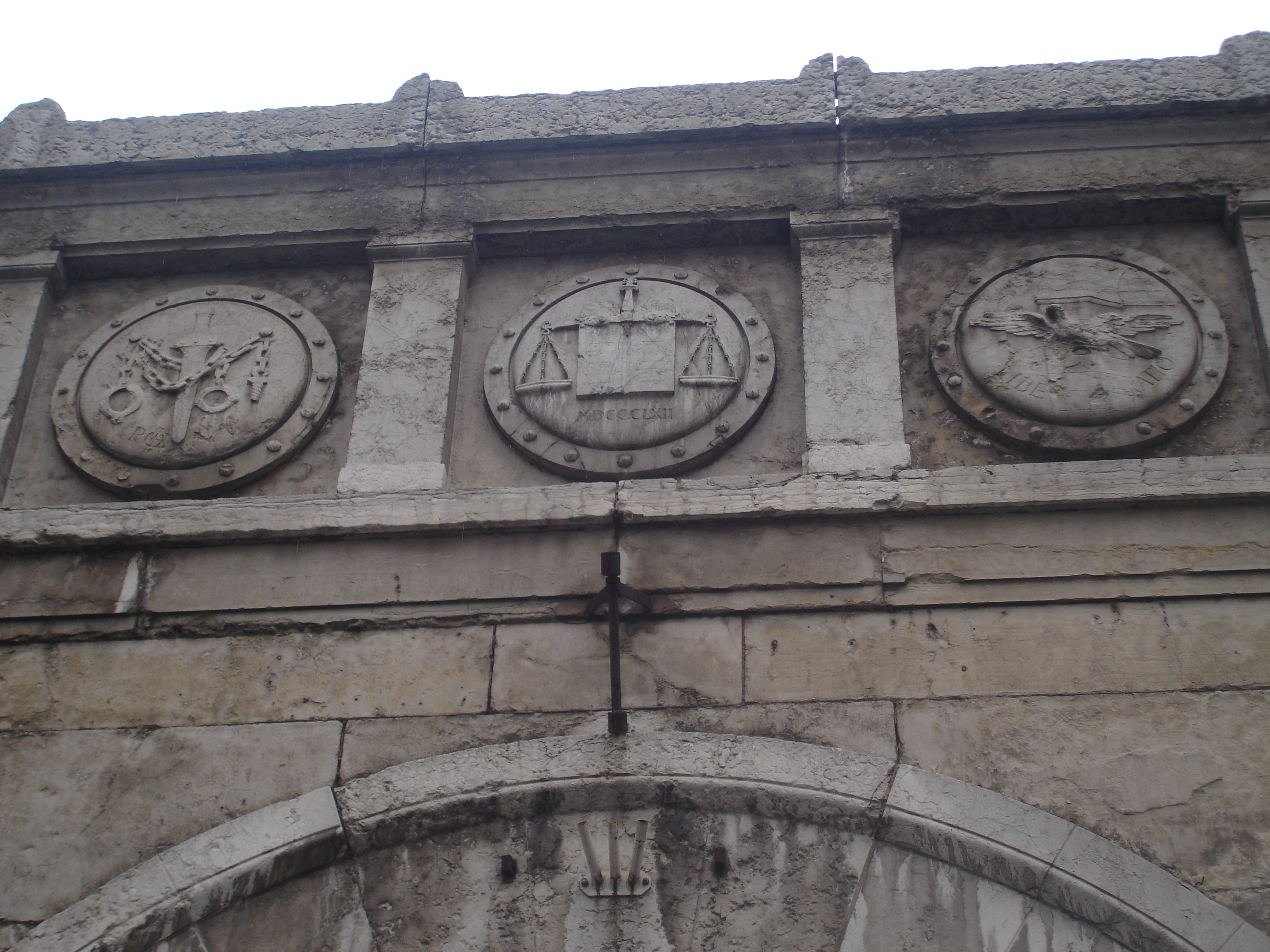
Pediment of the entrance
