= Paris protest against General Ridgway =

20th century French communist protest

Demonstration against General Ridgway
- Date: 1952-05-28
- Location: Paris

Parties
French Communist Party and affiliated movements

Casualties
- Deaths: 2

On May 28, 1952, French communists marched in protest against a visit by American General Matthew Ridgway. The communists accused him of using biological weapons in the Korean War.

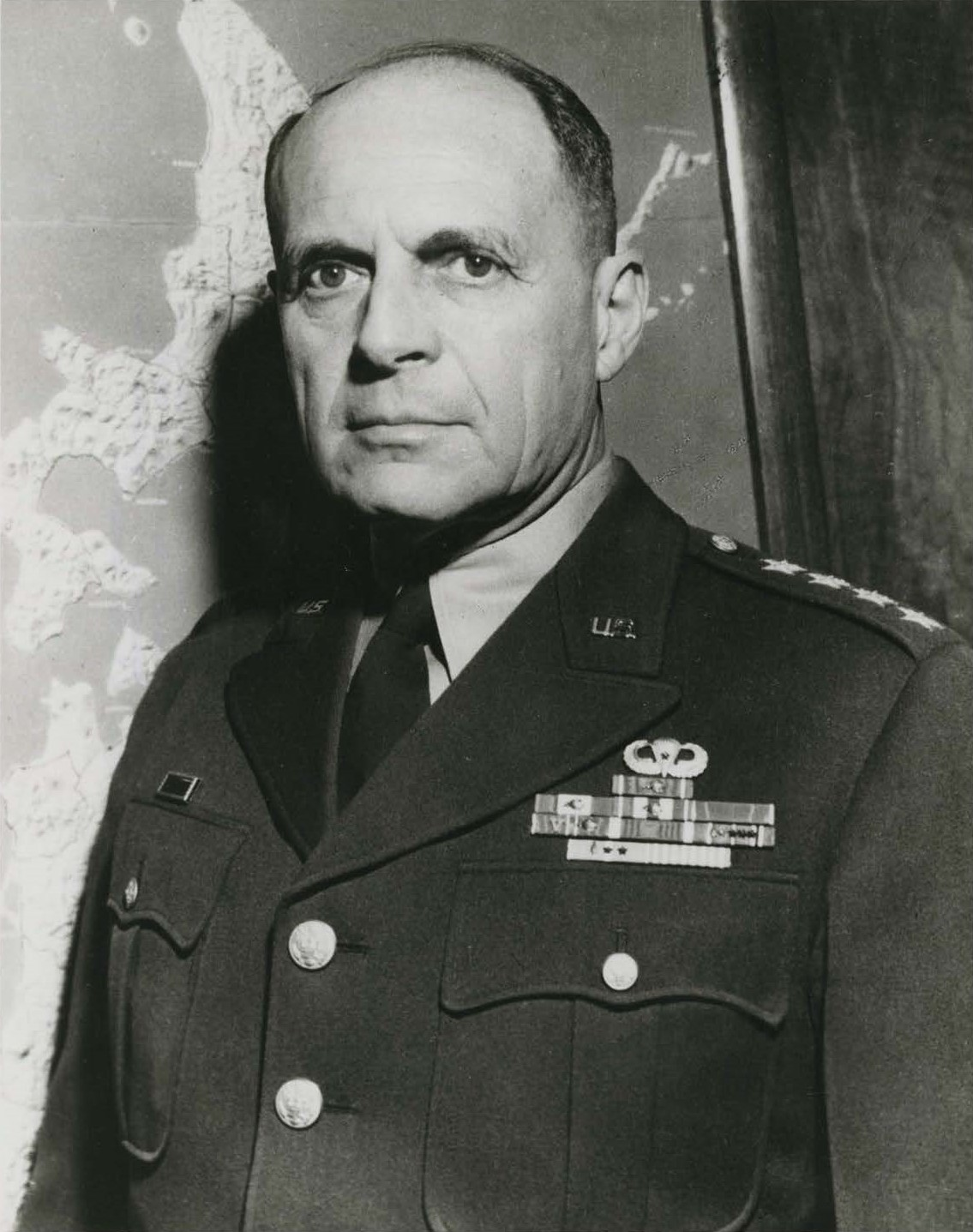
General Matthew Ridgway

During the Korean War, after a successful counteroffensive by United Nations troops under the command of General Ridgway, the international communist movement accused the United States of using biological weapons in Korea and in China. This accusation was false, and was contested by the United States Army, but nonetheless led to heavy criticism of Ridgway; the communist press called him "Ridgway the plague" ("Ridgway la peste") or the "microbe general" ("le général microbien").

On May 2, 1953, the Kremlin sent the Soviet ambassador to Beijing, V. V. Kouznetsov, to send the following message to Mao Zedong:

The Soviet Government and the Central Committee of the CPSU were misled. The spread in the press of information about the use by the Americans of bacteriological weapons in Korea was based on false information. The accusations against the Americans were fictitious.

== Demonstration and Violence ==
On May 28, 1952, the Mouvement de la paix, led by the Communist party, called a demonstration in Paris against General Ridgeway's coming to France for his appointment as the Supreme Allied Commander Europe in NATO. The mass protest included many communist sympathizers and it rapidly degenerated into conflicts with security forces, resulting in many injuries. Two demonstrators were shot: Hocine Belaïd, a commune employee, and Charles Guénard, a factory worker. They died some days later. 372 police officers were hurt in the conflict, 27 seriously. Many people were arrested and the headquarters of the French Communist Party was raided.

== Arrest of Duclos and the Pigeon Plot ==
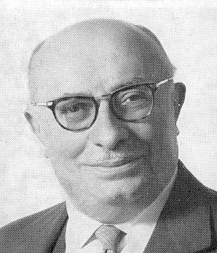
Jacques Duclos.

The same evening, Jacques Duclos, the acting head of the French Communist Party in the absence of Maurice Thorez (who was ill, and convalescing in Moscow), was arrested and charged with endangering state security after the discovery of a 7.65mm pistol and some pigeons in the trunk of his car. The trunk also contained his notes on the proceedings of the Secretariat and Political Bureau of the French Communist Party. He had written: "We are working toward the certain defeat [of the French Army] in Vietnam, Korea, and Tunisia" ("Nous travaillons pour la défaite certaine [de l'armée française] au Viêt Nam, en Corée, en Tunisie"). To Interior Minister Charles Brune, the two birds were carrier pigeons, and evidence that Duclos was a traitor to France. This was quickly contradicted by the police, since the pigeons had in fact been dead; according to Duclos, they were killed by hunting and were destined to be eaten. After being incarcerated for a time in La Santé Prison, Duclos was freed.
