= November 11, 1943 parade in Oyonnax =

Emblematic parade in French history

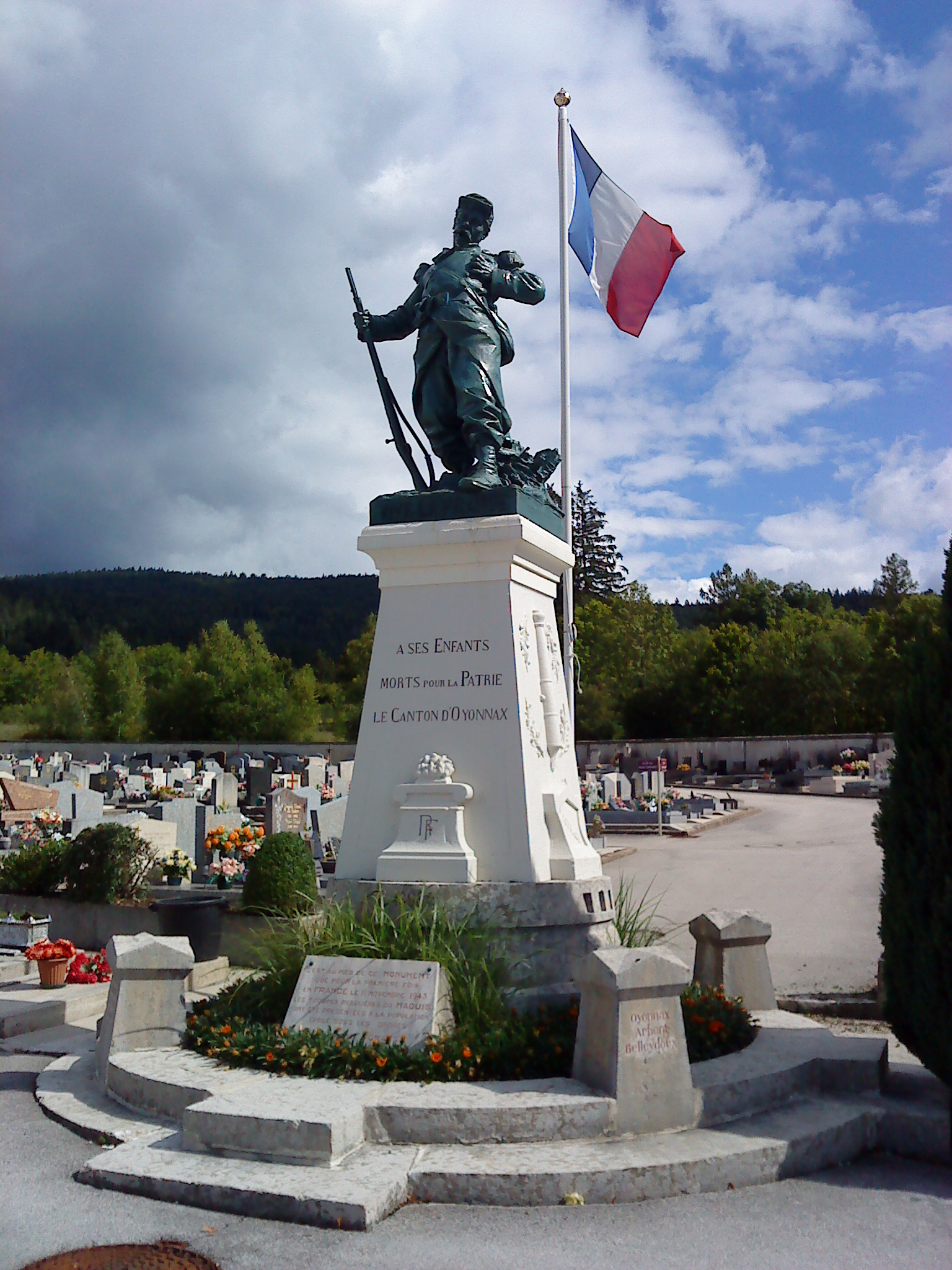
- "Le François" war memorial, at the foot of which the wreath was laid. (originally located in Parc René-Nicod, it has since been moved to the Oyonnax cemetery).
- Date: November 1943
- Location: France, Oyonnax
- Participants: Maquis de l'Ain et du Haut-Jura

The November 11, 1943 parade in Oyonnax is one of the most emblematic actions in the history of the Ain and Haut-Jura maquis and the French Resistance. During the Second World War, when the government of Marshal Philippe Pétain banned all ceremonies commemorating the 1918 armistice, the maquis leaders decided to ignore the ban and organize a parade through the streets of Oyonnax, in the occupied zone. The maquis suffered reprisals, and the town's mayor and one of his deputies were subsequently shot. The event was quickly publicized, notably on December 31, 1943, in a forged issue of Le Nouvelliste. The Anglo-Saxon press relayed the information, while Emmanuel d'Astier de La Vigerie himself informed Winston Churchill. It was this parade that convinced him of the need to arm the French Resistance.

After the war, Oyonnax was awarded the Resistance medal, which appears under its coat of arms.

== Preparations ==
November 11, 1943, marked the twenty-fifth anniversary of the 1918 Armistice. The French state, under the government of Marshal Philippe Pétain, banned all ceremonies commemorating the Allied victory over the German Empire. Despite the ban, leaders of the domestic Resistance decided to lay wreaths at the foot of several war memorials. The leader of the Ain maquis, Captain Henri Romans-Petit, then organized a parade to counter the image of terrorists that Marshal Pétain wanted to give the maquisards.

=== Tactics to deceive the occupying forces ===
The Mouvements unis de la Résistance had called for demonstrations in several towns on November 11, 1943, laying a wreath at the Monuments aux Morts bearing the inscription “Les vainqueurs de demain à ceux de 14-18” (“Tomorrow's victors to those of 14-18”). Romans Petit, departmental leader of the Secret Army and Maquis de l'Ain, decided to go one step further and parade his maquisards in arms. The location was kept secret. The M.U.R. departmental office was not notified until the day before. Wreath-laying ceremonies are held in Bourg-en-Bresse, Nantua, Ambérieu-en-Bugey, Bellegarde, Belley, Meximieux, Hauteville, Virieu-le-Grand, Cormoranche, Montréal, Seyssel, Grièges and Saint-Rambert-en-Bugey. The inscription “Les vainqueurs de demain à ceux de 14-18” (“Tomorrow's victors to those of 14-18”) appears on each of these wreaths. In Nantua, there is also a parade of almost 300 people, ending with the singing of La Marseillaise.

The town of Oyonnax was chosen because of the intense activity of the local secret army. The demonstration was prepared by Noël Perrotot, Élie Deschamps, and Gabriel Jeanjacquot, all three Oyonnaxiens who knew the town well. Two men were charged with securing and neutralizing the town. They were Henri Girousse and Édouard Bourret, who obtained the support of the police commissioner and the gendarmerie captain, as well as the neutralization of the telephone exchange.

=== Uniforms and weapons ===
The maquisards were each dressed in a leather jacket, green breeches, belt, and beret. These uniforms were taken from the first major action carried out by the maquis under the leadership of Henri Romans-Petit: the capture of the Chantiers de la Jeunesse supply depot in Artemare, on the night of September 10, 1943.

In order to present the image of a well-organized troop, and thus ensure the uniformity of their weaponry, some maquisards paraded with fake wooden “Sten” machine pistols they had made themselves.

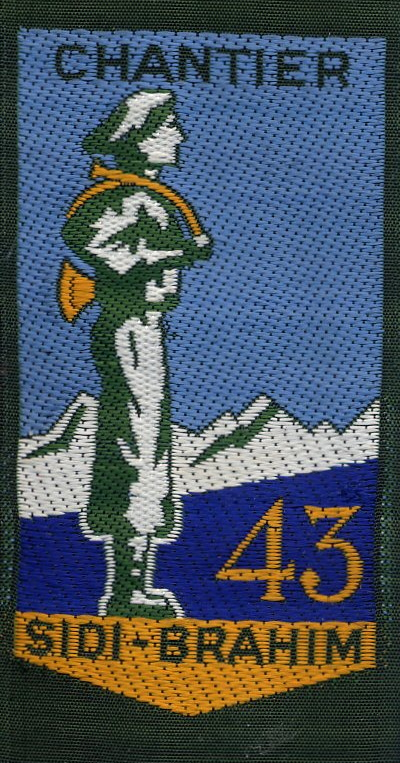
Artemare FJC badge.

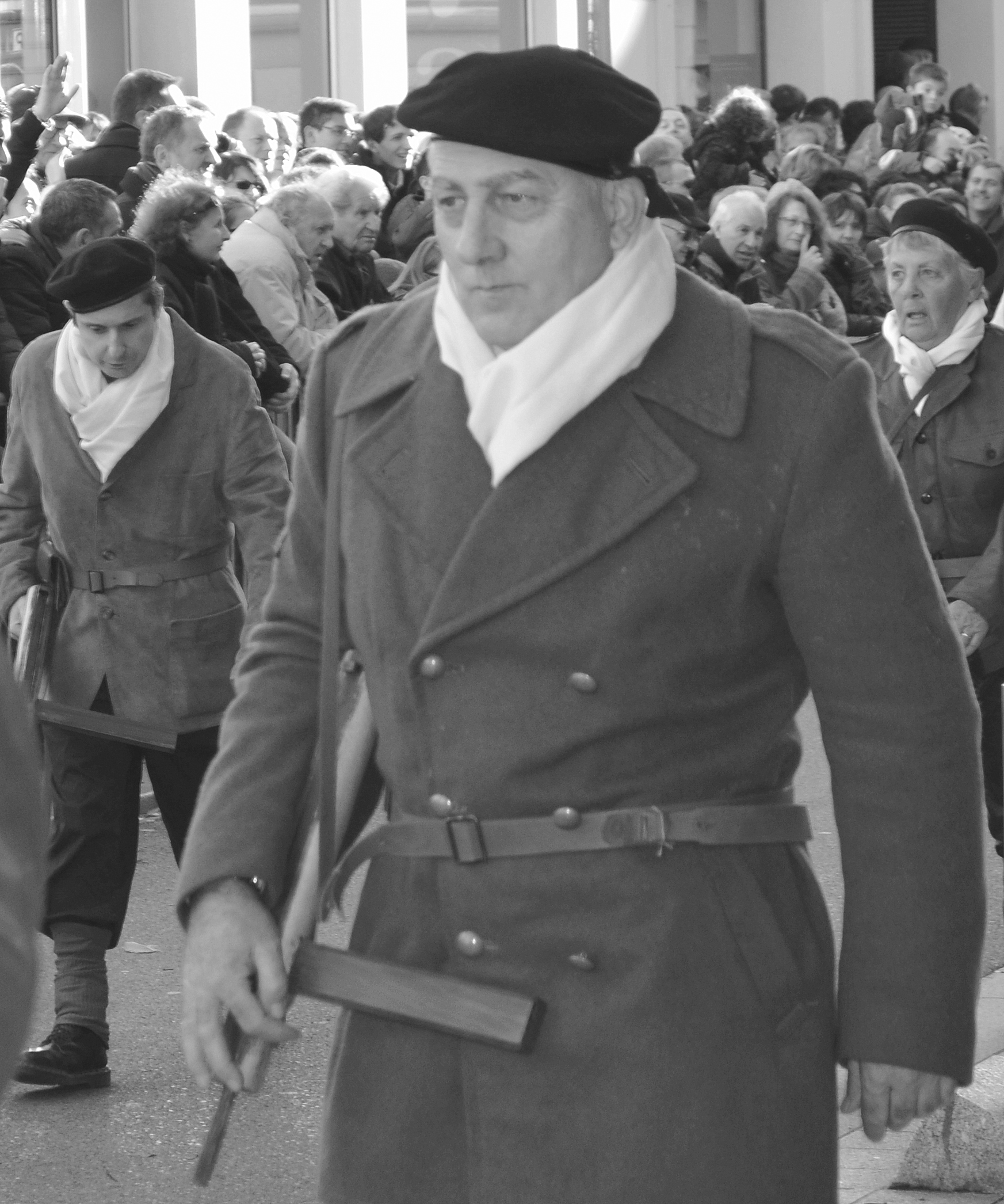
Comedian in beret at parade re-enactment on November 11, 2013 (70th anniversary).

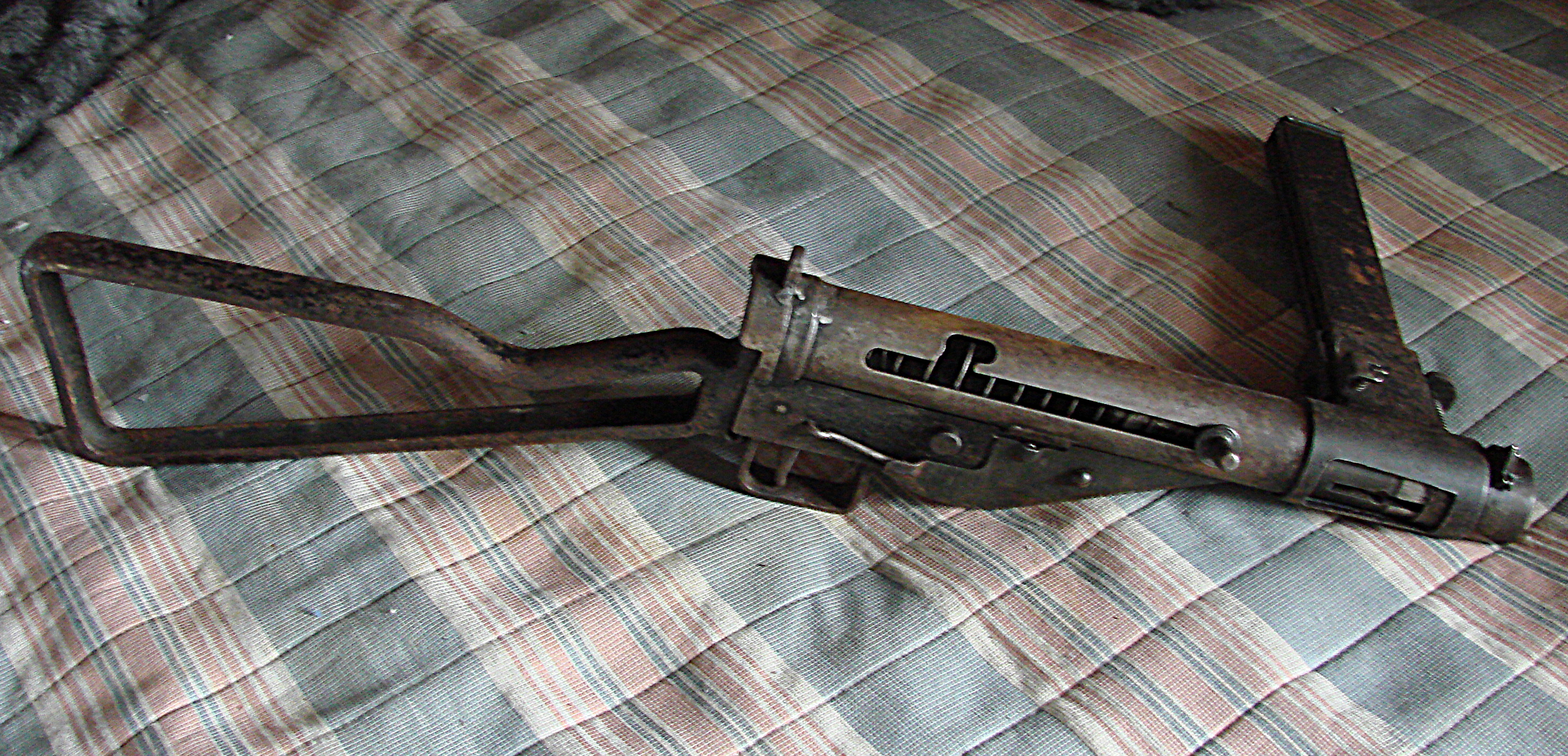
Ain maquis Sten machine pistol.

== The November 11, 1943 parade ==
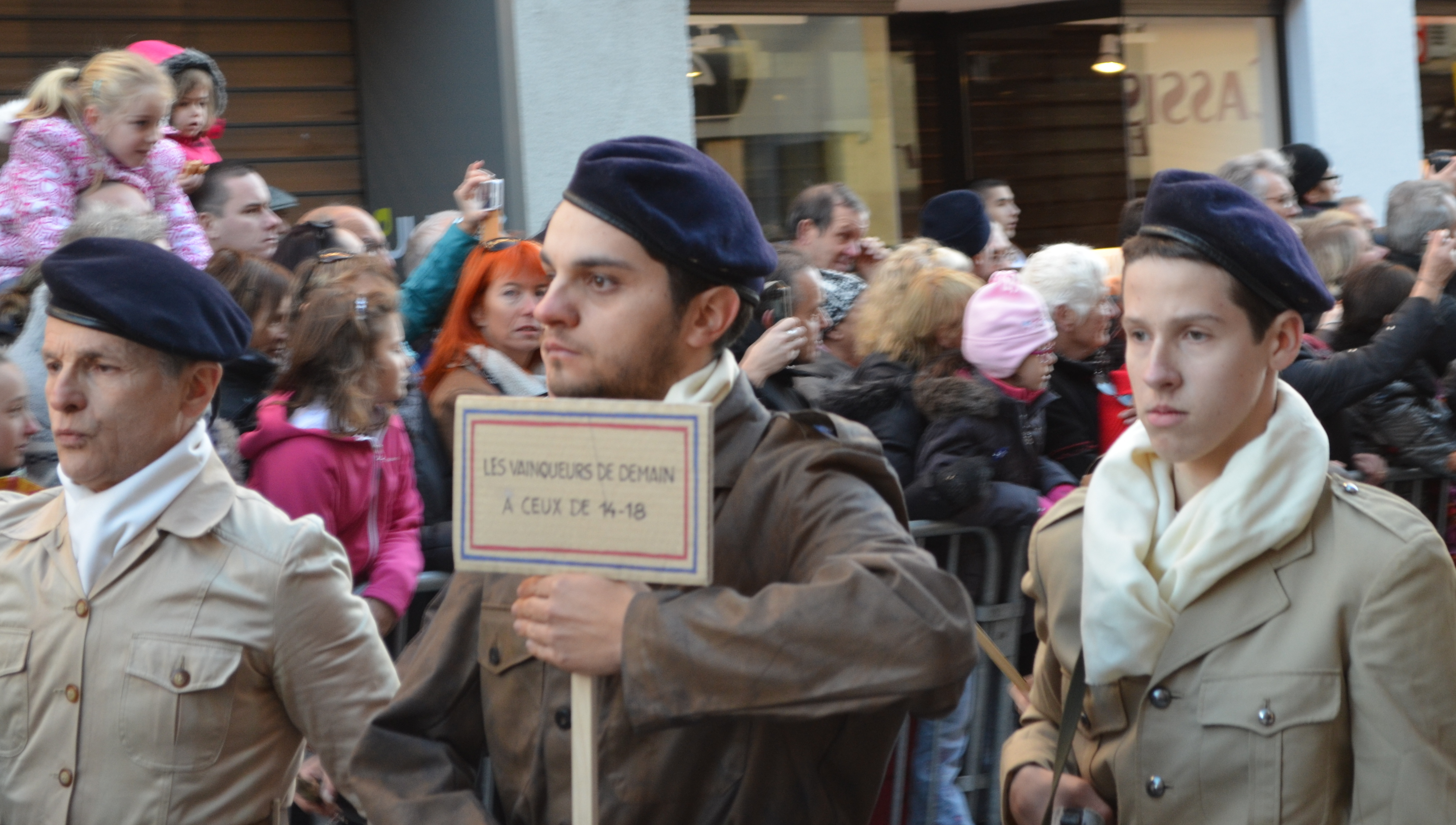
The inscription “Tomorrow's victors to those of 14-18” during the parade re-enactment on November 11, 2013 (70th anniversary).

Around midday on November 11th, some two hundred maquisards from the Ain and Haut-Jura regions, under the command of Colonel Henri Romans-Petit, took possession of the town of Oyonnax. They marched to the war memorial, to the sound of the bugle, with the French flag at the head. They laid a wreath in the shape of a Lorraine cross bearing the inscription:

Tomorrow's victors to those of 14-18.

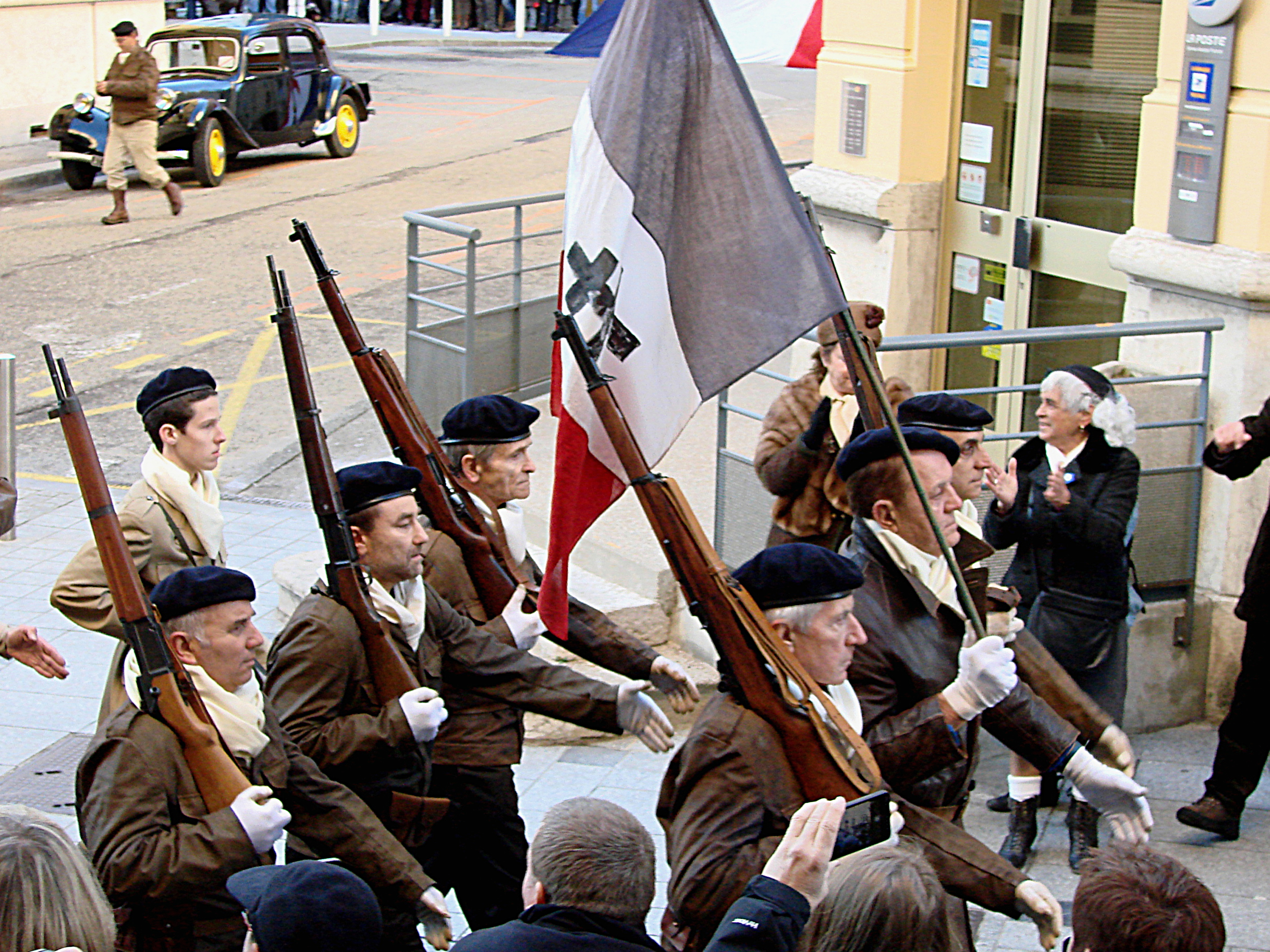
A Lorraine cross on a flag during a parade re-enactment on November 11, 2013 (70th anniversary).

During the parade, security is provided by masked maquisards. These are Oyonnaxiens charged with watching the crowd for any militiamen or collaborators. The mask, a white cloth with two holes for the eyes, slipped under the beret, served to conceal the identity of the maquisards in order to avoid reprisals against their relatives living in the commune.

After a minute's silence, and a Marseillaise sung with the crowd, they set off again, singing “Vous n'aurez pas l'Alsace et la Lorraine” (You won't have Alsace and Lorraine) as they joined the trucks taking them back to their camps in Montagne.

=== Simultaneous actions ===
On the same day, a wreath bearing the same inscription - “Tomorrow's victors to those of 14-18” - was also laid at the war memorials in Nantua, Belley, Hauteville, Meximieux, Seyssel and Saint-Rambert-en-Bugey.

In Bourg-en-Bresse, before sunrise, the sector's maquis leader, André Levrier, and his companions went to the plinth where a bust of Edgar Quinet had stood before it was taken away by the Germans, and set up a bust of Marianne stamped with the letters “RF”, for République française, and a French flag with a Lorraine cross. At the same time, a group went to the war memorial to lay the gerbe. When this was discovered, the Germans had everything removed.

== Consequences of the parade ==
=== Media consequences ===
An eminently symbolic and media event, the November 11, 1943, parade in Oyonnax had a major impact in France and abroad. The event was covered by André Jacquelin (text and photos), the only journalist from the Ain maquis. A film was also shot by maquisard Raymond Jaboulay, son of Henry Jaboulay.

André Jacquelin's report was published in the December 1943 issue of Bir Hakeim, “a monthly Republican newspaper published in spite of the Gestapo, in spite of the slave-owner-gauleiter Laval and the Vichy government”.

The event was also reported on December 31, 1943, in a forged issue of Le Nouvelliste, a collaborationist Lyonnais daily (banned from publication after the war for collaboration). Produced by the Mouvements unis de la Résistance and with a print run of 30,000 copies, this newspaper was distributed between 5 and 7 a.m. at newsstands and newsagents in Lyon by Groupes Francs de la Résistance lyonnaise, the real copies being confiscated on the grounds of censorship.

Contributors to this apocryphal, unsigned issue included Marcel Grancher and Pierre Scize, Henry Jaboulay, possibly Eugène Pons, Yves Farge and Jacques Bergier. The articles and photographs were published in the Anglo-Saxon press, notably by the New York Times.

=== Reprisals ===
The Vichy government received a report from the intelligence services on November 13, 1943, which stated:

[...] this day of November 11, 1943, determines quite exactly how little regard is paid to the present government [...] It seems useful to note, with regard to the incidents in Oyonnax, the strong impression made on the population of this town by the parade of the “Jeunes du maquis”. [...] Faced with the political events that are shaking up our territory and our empire, some people are not ruling out the possibility, in the near future, of a swift restoration of order, thanks to these cohorts led by specifically French officers. - Report from the Direction Centrale des Renseignements Généraux, November 13, 1943.

Fearing that the maquisards would attract public sympathy, the government decided to carry out two successive repressive actions in the Haut-Bugey region. The first mobilized a 500-strong group of reserve mobile groups (GMR) on November 18, 1943, to attack the Granges camp. However, the only route to the farm was difficult to access, and return fire forced the troops to retreat to retreat. A second attack was planned with 1,500 GMR. One of the maquis leaders who organized the November 11th parade, Élie Deschamps, learned that some GMR leaders feared this new attack against the maquis, as they estimated its strength at a thousand men. However, there were only 90 men at the Granges farm at the time of the first attack. Élie Deschamps contacts an officer of the Garde Mobile, whom he calls Vincent. Vincent was in charge of the troops attacking the farm. The two men reached an agreement: the camp would be evacuated at the time of the attack. The GMR will then be able to recover a weapon and underground newspapers as proof of their victory. The Germans were not fooled by the GMR's ineffectiveness, so they decided to organize a roundup to dissuade the population from helping the maquis. The roundup took place in Nantua, where they indiscriminately arrested 120 men aged between 18 and 40, including schoolchildren. They were sent to Compiègne and then to the Buchenwald concentration camp. Doctor Émile Mercier, denounced as the leader of the Secret Army's Ain sector C5Note 1, was taken in tow by the Sipo/Sd. He was shot at Maillat.

=== Political consequences ===
A few weeks later, the Anglo-Saxon press reported on the parade. In London, Emmanuel d'Astier de La Vigerie himself informed Winston Churchill. It was the November 11, 1943 parade in Oyonnax that is said to have convinced Winston Churchill of the need to arm the French Resistance. Other consequences of the parade occurred in the following months: Oyonnax mayor Paul Maréchal and his deputy Auguste Sonthonnax were shot in December 1943. Oyonnax was rewarded for its attitude and enthusiasm with the Resistance medal beneath its coat of arms.

== Parade participants ==
Parade participants included maquis leaders and men from the Morez and Corlier camps. The organization of the parade is described below.

(Groupe franc protection) Roger Tanton
Officials
(Groupe franc protection) René Mérigneux	Henri Petit, alias Romans (Ain Maquis Leader)	Henry Jaboulay, alias Belleroche (Regional Maquis Leader)	(Groupe franc protection) Louis Cini	
(Groupe franc protection) Francis Hérin	Charles Mohler, alias Duvernois (Deputy Regional Chief)	Lucien Bonnet, alias Dunoir (Deputy Regional Head, sector R1)	(Groupe franc protection) Maurice Chevalier	
Guard of the flag
(In charge of Groupe Franc Protection) Pierre Chassé, alias Ludo	Jean Chevalier	Raymond Mulard	Roger Grelounaud	
(Groupe franc protection) Raymond Massacrier	Charles Sartory	Marcel Grummault	Jean Vandeville	(Groupe franc protection) Michel Jacquet
Clique
Marcel Lugand	Stéphane Vighetti	Philippe Curtet		
Wreath bearers
Marius Roche	Julien Roche	René Escoffier		
Sections
Officer 1st section Jean-Pierre de Lassus Saint-Geniès, alias Legrand
1st section - Morez camp Officer 2nd section Pierre Marcault, alias Marco
2nd section - Morez camp Officer 3rd section Henri Girouss
3rd section - Corlier camp Closing officer Jean Vaudan, alias Verduraz

=== Composition of Sections 1 and 2 of the Morez camp ===
- Georges Alloin
- Pierre Assadas
- Marc Bayon
- Robert Bernachon
- Jean Billard
- Victor Bolcato
- René Bonnaud
- Georges Carroz
- Jean Caufiez
- Georges Cerciat
- Ferutio Charadia
- Noël Chavasse
- Jean Chevalier
- Maurice Chevalier
- Louis Cini
- André Clément
- Eugène Collet
- Colombel
- Raymond Comtet
- Philippe Curtet
- Maurice Demia
- Raymond Denton
- Maurice Dubois
- Eugène Dubost
- Roger Dur
- Henri Durand
- René Escoffier
- Christian Finaly
- Marcel Garden
- Honoré Girolamy
- René Golay
- Roger Graver
- Roger Grelounaud
- Jean Grosclaude
- Marcel Grummault
- René Guillemot
- Francis Herin
- Alfred Innocent
- Michel Jacquet
- Pierre Jacquet
- Paul Jubelin Paul
- Marcel Kosperzack
- Auguste Legodec
- Jean Lemine
- Paul Linsolas
- Pierre Marini
- Raymond Marmont
- Raymond Massacrier
- Eugène Mathys
- Jean Mauget
- René Merigneux
- Alexis Mongin
- Jacques Mulard
- Raymond Mulard
- André Murtier
- Marcel Musset
- René Niogret
- Henri Orset
- Georges Page
- Roger Page
- Aimé Parjoie
- René Pechu
- Élie Perret
- Roger Perrin
- René Plantier
- André Plasse
- Jean Pouillard
- Roger Pradat
- Jean-Pierre Prospero
- Marcel Rendu
- Marcel Rochas
- Julien Roche
- Marius Roche
- Jean Rousse
- Charles Sartory
- Gabriel Sinardet
- Roger Tanton
- Pierre Thedenat
- Jacques Therond
- Jean Tisserand
- Georges Tosi
- Jean Vandeville
- Georges Verdaud
- Stéphane Vighetti
- Raymond Vincent
- Maurice Vuillard
- Jean-Baptiste Zwenger

=== Composition of Section 3 of the Corlier camp ===
- Lucien Bellamy
- Floriand Bonardi
- Boulaie
- Alexandre Chappaz
- Jean Chauvin
- Dante Campioli
- Louis Debesse
- Albert Doleatto
- Lucien Fabre
- André Fardel
- Armand Faron
- Henri Girard
- Jean Jacquet
- Georges Lazzarin
- Raymond Legard
- Marcel Lugand
- Paul Maréchal
- Hubert Mermet
- Robert Montinoise
- Neyraud
- Francisque Norbert
- René Nugues
- Raymond Payan
- Jean Planaises
- Henri Prost
- Robert Sordet
- Gaston Zuliani
- René Antoinet

=== Composition of the Spanish group (Corlier camp) ===
- François Jimenez
- Joseph Lacayo
- Hermenegildo Martinez
- Molinez
- Eustaquio Reinoso
- Sobrino
- Uroz (Jacquy)

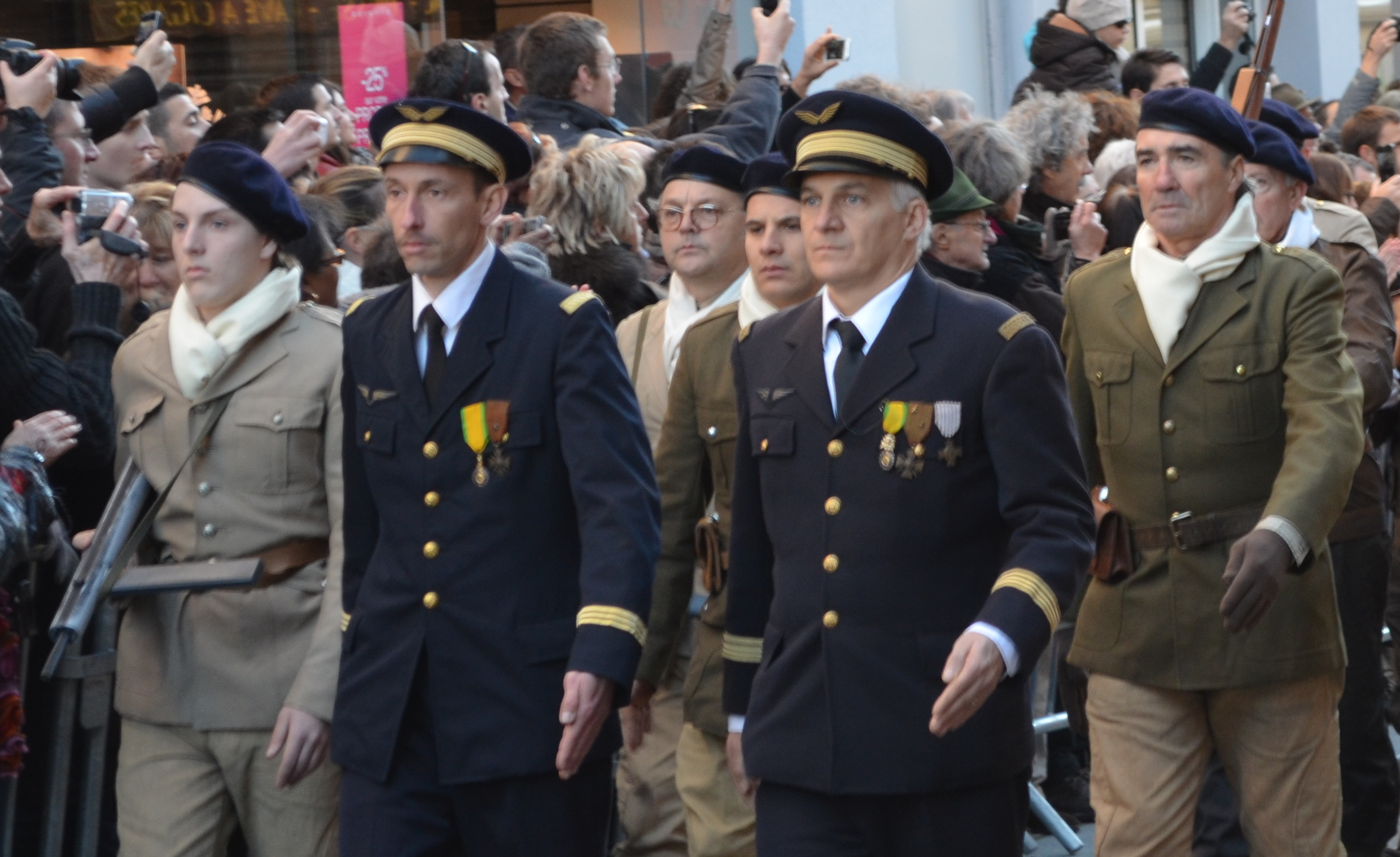
Actors playing Romans-Petit and Jaboulay at the parade's 70th anniversary in 2013.

== Memory ==
- A monument in Oyonnax called the “Stone Giants”, designed by Charles Machet, pays tribute to the November 11, 1943 parade. It was inaugurated on June 6, 1948. An unknown maquisard is buried at the foot of the monument.
- A plaque at 10 rue de la paix in Oyonnax recalls that Henri Romans-Petit was sheltered by the Jeanjacquot family in November 1943.
- There is a rue Paul-Maréchal and a rue Sonthonnax (named after the mayor and his deputy who were executed in reprisal) in Oyonnax.
- Episode 10 of season 5 of the TV series Un village français, entitled L'Alsace et la Lorraine (November 11, 1943), features a parade through the small town, largely inspired by actual events.

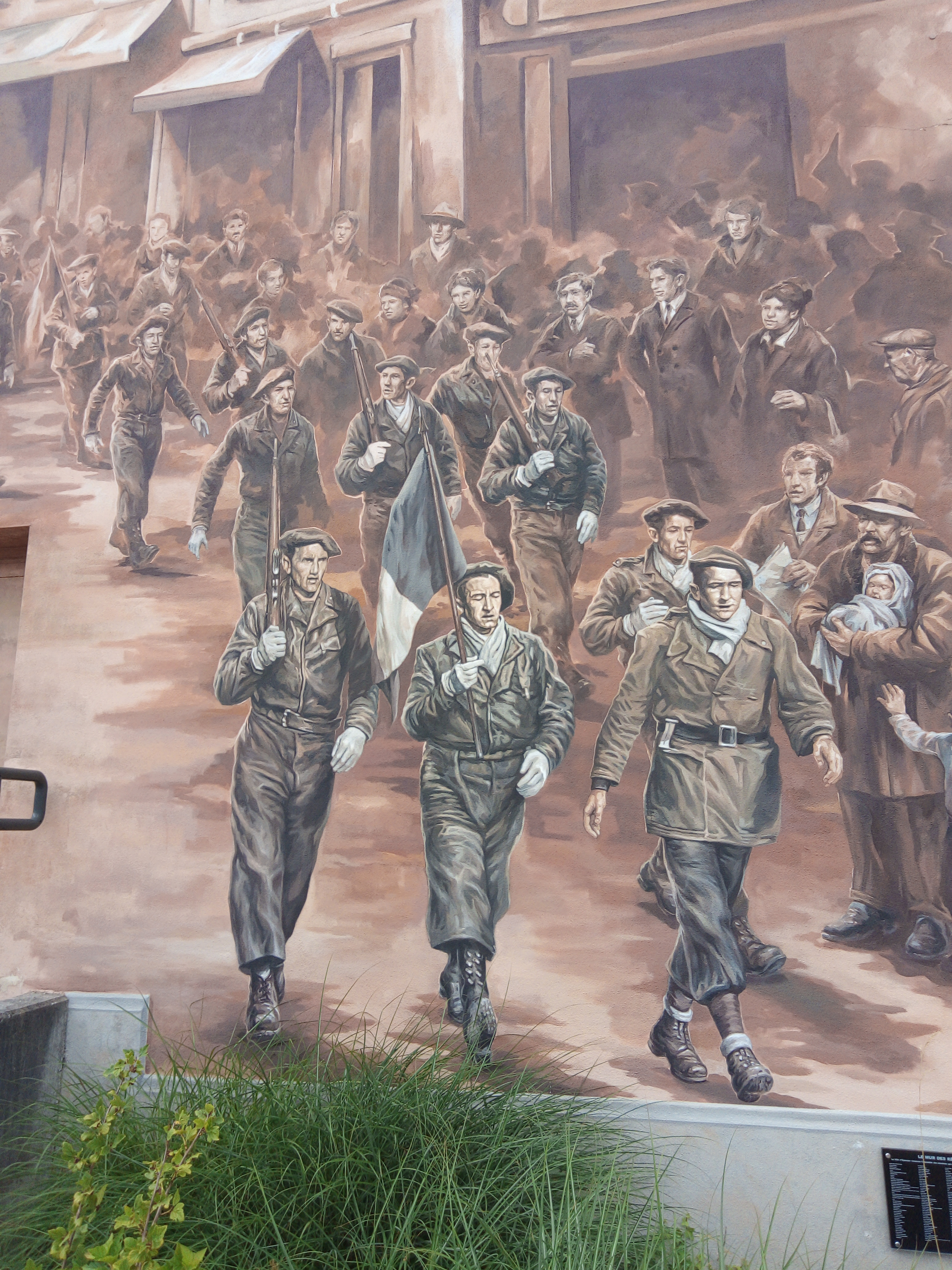
Detail of the Resistance Wall.

=== Anniversary celebrations ===
November 11th in Oyonnax has traditionally been the subject of commemorations, usually involving the highest representatives of the State.

- In 1953, for the tenth anniversary, Henri Romans-Petit and Alban Vistel marched with other maquisards in front of François Collaveri (prefect of the Ain department) and Daniel Mayer (member of parliament).
- In 1963, Charles de Gaulle came to Oyonnax for the twentieth anniversary, but on a date other than November 11. The November 11 ceremony itself was the subject of debate among former Resistance fighters as to whether or not to invite sub-prefect Georges Dupoizat (a former maquisard) as a representative of the State. Some of them intended to protest against the release of war criminals Carl Oberg and Helmut Knochen in 1962.
- In 1973, dissension among members of the Resistance led to the organization of a first ceremony on November 4 with Jean-Pierre de Lassus Saint-Geniès and Henri Girousse, followed by a second on November 11 with Henri Romans-Petit.
- In 1983, to mark the fortieth anniversary, François Mitterrand, accompanied by ministers Charles Hernu and Louis Mermaz, attended the November 11 ceremony in Oyonnax.
- In 1993, General Alain de Boissieu, General de Gaulle's son-in-law, attended the ceremonies.
- In 2003, Michèle Alliot-Marie, then Minister of Defense, attended the ceremonies with Marius Roche (elected representative of Bourg-en-Bresse and participant in the 1943 parade).
- In 2013, on the occasion of the 70th anniversary, a mural celebrating the parade was inaugurated by French President François Hollande. He also paid tribute to the town, the people, and the last (allegedly) surviving participant Marcel Lugand. A faithful re-enactment of the parade also took place. It was performed by the company Vox International Théâtre. François Hollande addressed Marcel Lugand: “Marcel Lugand, you are the last actor in this parade of hope, you were the bugler, we can still hear you. Through you, Marcel Lugand, and beyond you, may the Resistance be saluted“. It appears that one or more of the other participants in the 1943 parade were still alive on November 11, 2013: André Clément, Armand Faron, and even Hubert Reverchon.

== See also ==
- French Resistance
- Maquis de l'Ain et du Haut-Jura
- Oyonnax

== Bibliography ==
- Saurel, Louis (1945). Le maquis de l'Ain (in French). Paris: Fernand Nathan.
- Croisy, Édouard (1973). La Résistance dans l'Ain (in French). Bourg-en-Bresse.
- Maubourg, Paul (2007). Les mauvais souvenirs : Mémoires d'un orphelin de guerre d'Oyonnax (in French). ISBN 978-2952074025.
- Veyret, Patrick (2010). Histoire secrète des Maquis de l'Ain : Acteurs et enjeux (in French). Châtillon-sur-Chalaronne: La Taillanderie. ISBN 978-2-87629-325-0.
- Di Carlo, Jacqueline (1994). La Guerre de 1939/1940 dans le canton de Saint-Rambert-en-Bugey (in French). ISBN 2-907881-12-4.
