= Hôtel de Ville, Oyonnax =

Town hall in Oyonnax, France

Hôtel de Ville
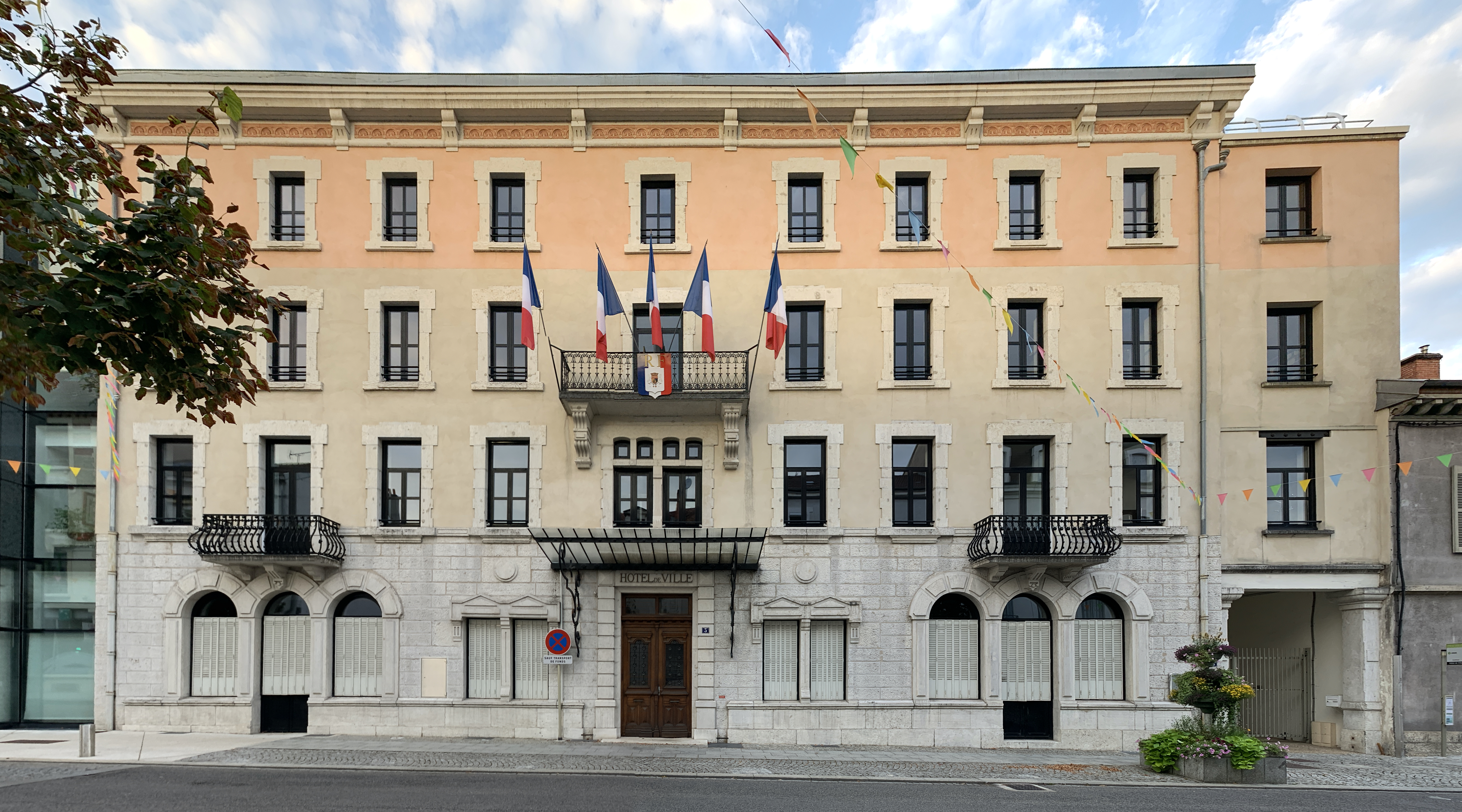
- The main frontage of the Hôtel de Ville in August 2020
- Interactive map of the Hôtel de Ville area

General information
- Type: City hall
- Architectural style: Neoclassical style
- Location: Oyonnax, France
- Coordinates: 46.2576°N 5.6556°E
- Completed: c.1899

The Hôtel de Ville (French pronunciation: [otɛl də vil], City Hall) is a municipal building in Oyonnax, Ain, in eastern France, standing on Rue Anatole France.

== History ==
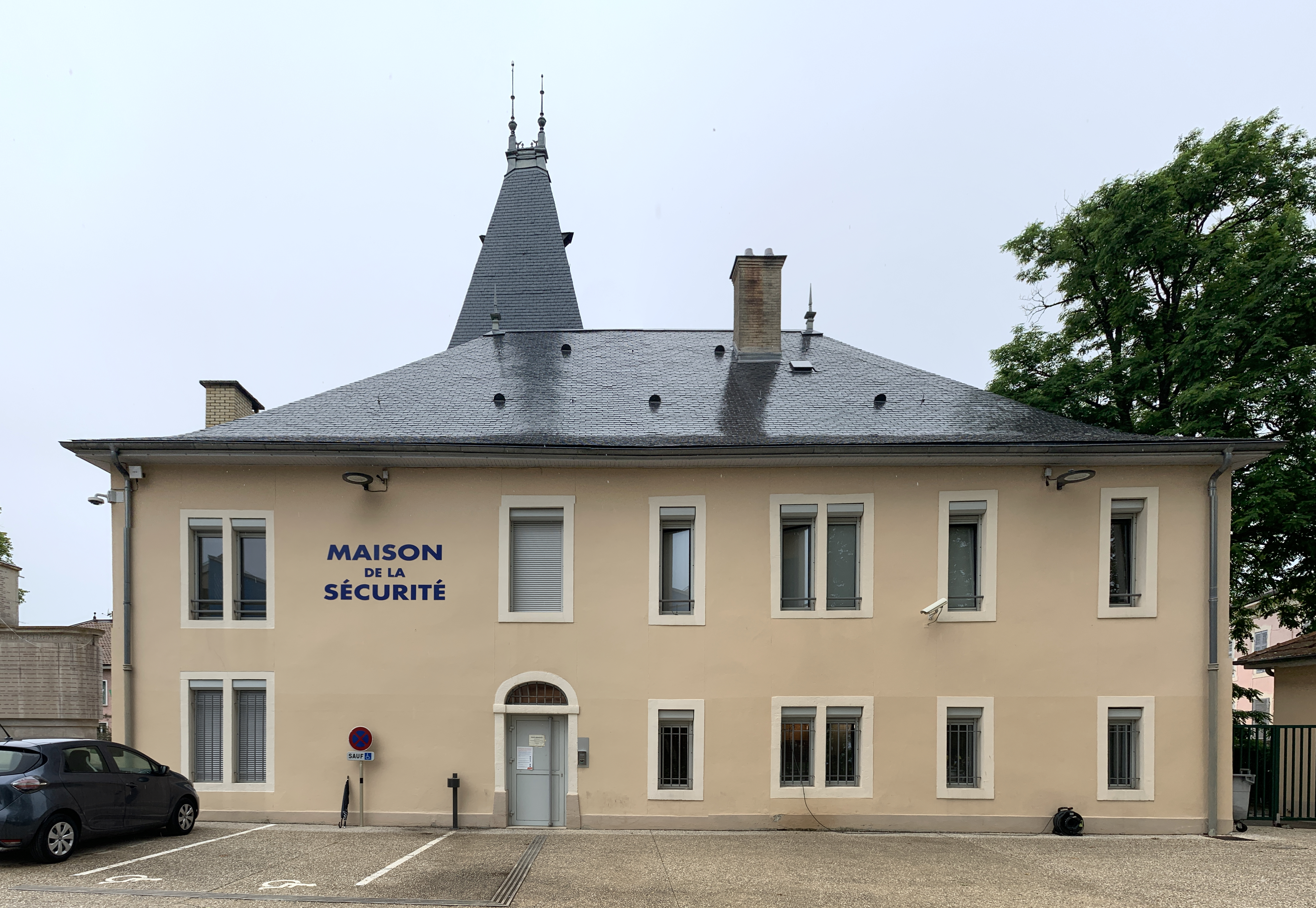
The old town hall (rear view)

=== The old town hall ===
Following the French Revolution, the new town council initially met at the house of the mayor at the time. This arrangement continued until 1880 when the council decided to acquire a dedicated municipal building. The property they selected was a house known as the Maison Brunet on what is now Rue Anatole France. It had been commissioned by two brothers, Antoine et Jean Brunet, who worked as local notaries, in the early 17th century. It had been designed in the neoclassical style, built in brick with a cement render finish and completed in 1605.

The design involved an asymmetrical main frontage of six bays facing onto what is now Rue Pierre Brunet. The first four bays on the left were fenestrated by casement windows. The two right-hand bays formed a four-stage tower with a pyramid-shaped roof. The first stage contained a doorway in the left-hand bay, the second stage contained a pair of casement windows, the third stage contained a single casement window, and the fourth stage contained an oculus. After the building was no longer required for municipal purposes, it became the local police station.

=== The current building ===
In 1938, following significant population growth, the council led by the mayor, René Nicod, decided to acquire a more substantial building. The building they selected was the Hôtel Varin which was some 350 metres (1,150 ft) to the southwest along Rue Anatole France. The building had been commissioned as a hotel for travelers in the late 19th century. It had been designed in the neoclassical style, built in brick with a cement render finish and had been completed in around 1899.

The design involved a symmetrical main frontage of nine bays facing onto what is now Avenue Jean Jaurès. The central bay featured a square-headed doorway with a banded stone surround on the ground floor, a pair of casement windows on the first floor, a French door with a balcony on the second floor and a single casement window on the third floor. The first three bays from each end featured tri-partite round-headed openings on the ground floor, while the second bay from each end featured French doors with balconies on the first floor. The remainder of the building was fenestrated by casement windows with stone surrounds. At roof level, there was a frieze and a cornice supported by corbels.

On 11 November 1943, during the Second World War, there was a notable parade in the town by members of the Maquis de l'Ain et du Haut-Jura and the French Resistance in defiance of orders by Marshal Philippe Pétain, who had banned commemorations of the Armistice. The route taken by the marchers took them along Rue Anatole France, past the new town hall which they had secured, to the war memorial which was adjacent to the old town hall. Because of this blatant act of defiance, the mayor, Paul Maréchal and his deputy Auguste Sonthonnax were arrested and shot in December 1943.

A large extension, built in concrete and glass to a design by Jean-Pierre Genevois, was erected to the southeast of the main building and completed in 2002.
