= Henri Romans-Petit =

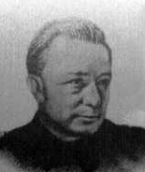
- Born: 13 February 1897; Firminy
- Died: 1 November 1980 (aged 83); Ceignes
- Occupation: Member of the French Resistance

Henri Romans-Petit (13 February 1897 – 1 November 1980) was a member of the French Resistance during the Second World War. He organised several maquis, notably the maquis de l'Ain et du Haut-Jura and the maquis de Haute-Savoie.

== Biography ==
Romans-Petit was born on the 13 February 1897 at Firminy in the Loire département. He was mobilized in 1938. After the armistice, he failed in his attempt to join Free France in London. At Saint-Étienne, he connected with the L'Espoir network affiliated to Franc-Tireur. He was involved in preparing areas for parachute drops around Lyon.

In 1942 Romans-Petit organised the maquis de l'Ain et du Haut-Jura, and on 11 November 1943 he marched in the town of Oyonnax at the head of his maquisards. This fact was said to have decided the English and French forces in London to send arms drops to the French maquisards who were in desperate need of them. An agent of the United Kingdom's clandestine Special Operations Executive, Richard Heslop, arranged the air drops of arms and equipment.

Romans-Petit was involved in starting maquis in Haute-Savoie, before he passed over his responsibilities to Tom Morel so that he could dedicate himself completely to the Maquis de L'Ain. Over the summer of 1944 Romans-Petit set up a full civil administration at Nantua, and brought La voix du maquis into being. On the liberation of France, he was imprisoned for several weeks at Fort Lamothe at Lyon by the new commissaire de la République, Yves Farge.

Romans-Petit died on the 1 November 1980 at Ceignes in the Ain département.

== Works ==
- Les Obstinés, Janicot, Lille, 1945.
- L’Appel de l’aventure, Dorian, Saint-Etienne, 1947.
- Les Maquis de l'Ain, Hachette, 1974.

== Recognition ==
- France: Grand Officier of the Légion d'honneur, Compagnon de la Libération, Croix de guerre 1914-1918, Croix de guerre 1939-1945, Médaille de la Résistance
- United Kingdom: Distinguished Service Order
- United States of America: Officer of the Legion of Merit
- Belgium: Officier of the Order of Leopold (Belgium)
- Congo: Commander of the Order of Merit
- Cameroon: Officer of the Order of Merit
- Tunisia: Grand Officier of the Nichan Iftikhar (order of glory)

== Sources and external links ==
- Portrait of Henri Romans-Petit on the Ordre de la Libération site (French)
- Raymond Ruffin, Ces chefs du Maquis qui gênaient, Presses de la Cité, 1980.
