= Arbent =

Commune in Auvergne-Rhône-Alpes, France

- Commune
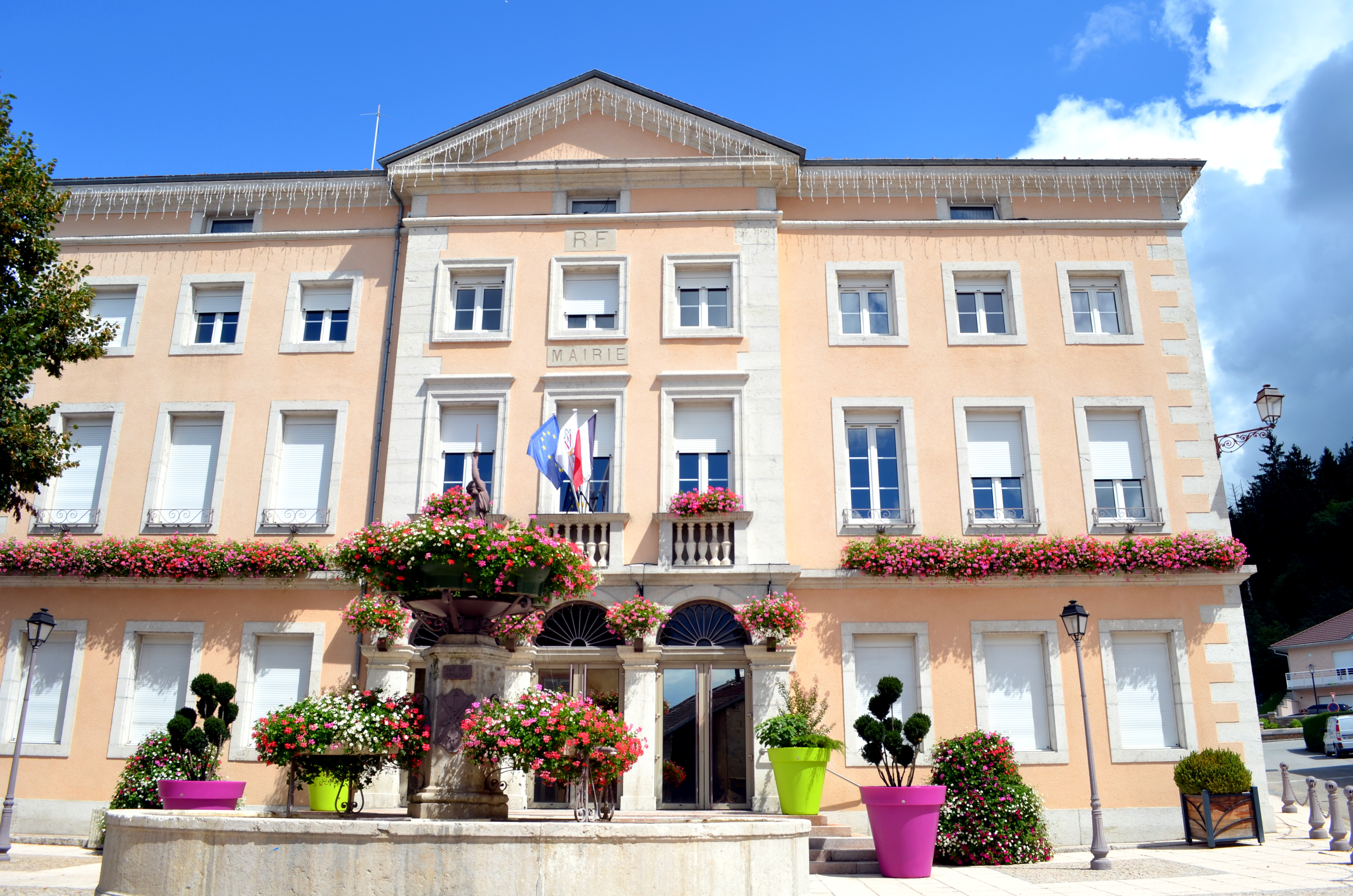
- Town hall

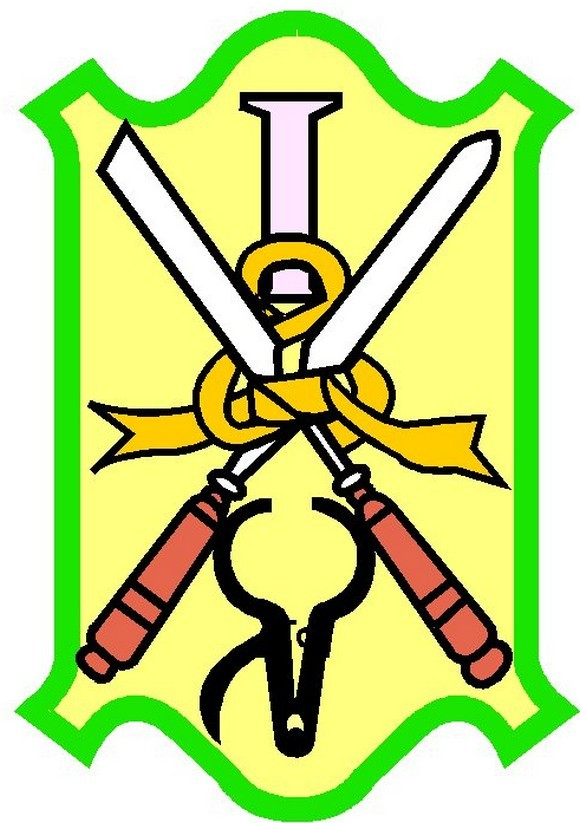
- Flag Coat of arms
- Location of Arbent
- Location within France Location within Auvergne-Rhône-Alpes
- Coordinates: 46°17′47″N 5°40′55″E
- Country: France
- Region: Auvergne-Rhône-Alpes
- Department: Ain
- Arrondissement: Nantua
- Canton: Oyonnax
- Intercommunality: Haut-Bugey Agglomération

Government
  - Mayor (2020–2026): Philippe Cracchiolo
- Area^{1}: 23.49 km^{2} (9.07 sq mi)
- Elevation: 535 m (1,755 ft)
- Highest elevation: 1,100 m (3,600 ft)
- Lowest elevation: 435 m (1,427 ft)
- Population (2023): 3,555
  - Density: 151.3/km^{2} (392.0/sq mi)
- Time zone: UTC+01:00 (CET)
  - Summer (DST): UTC+02:00 (CEST)
- INSEE/Postal code: 01014 /01100
- Website: https://www.arbent.fr/
- ^{1} French Land Register data, which excludes lakes, ponds, glaciers > 1 km^{2} (0.386 sq mi or 247 acres) and river estuaries.

Arbent (French pronunciation: [aʁbɑ̃]) is a commune in the department of Ain in the Auvergne-Rhône-Alpes region of eastern France.

The commune has been awarded two flowers by the National Council of Towns and Villages in Bloom in the Competition of cities and villages in Bloom.

== Geography ==
The commune of Arbent is in the extreme north of the department of Ain at the northern edge of the Upper Bugey. It is in the Jura Mountains at the door of the Regional Natural Park of Upper Jura.

Arbent is about 35 km north-east of Bourg-en-Bresse and 2 km north of Oyonnax. It can be accessed from the south-west by Highway A404 which terminates in the commune. It is also accessed by road D31 from Oyonnax in the south which intersects the termination of the A404 and continues to Dortan in the north-west. The D85 road also goes from Oyonnax to the village (which is a northern continuation of the Oyonnax conurbation) and continues west to Viry. The south-west of the commune is an extension of the conurbation of Oyonnax with the rest of the commune being heavily forested mountains.

The Ruisseau de Merdanson rises in the south of the commune and joins with the Ruisseau de Col du Lary flowing north then west through the village then west and north to join the Bienne river.

=== Climate ===
The climate type is semi-continental, with cold winters, hot summers and precipitation falling mainly in summer.

Climate data for Arbent (1991−2020 normals, extremes 2004−present)
Month	Jan	Feb	Mar	Apr	May	Jun	Jul	Aug	Sep	Oct	Nov	Dec	Year
Record high °C (°F)	18.4 (65.1)	22.1 (71.8)	25.1 (77.2)	28.0 (82.4)	32.6 (90.7)	37.1 (98.8)	39.2 (102.6)	37.8 (100.0)	33.1 (91.6)	28.2 (82.8)	23.9 (75.0)	18.2 (64.8)	39.2 (102.6)
Mean daily maximum °C (°F)	6.1 (43.0)	7.5 (45.5)	12.0 (53.6)	16.7 (62.1)	19.6 (67.3)	24.0 (75.2)	26.3 (79.3)	25.3 (77.5)	21.9 (71.4)	17.3 (63.1)	11.0 (51.8)	6.7 (44.1)	16.2 (61.2)
Daily mean °C (°F)	1.6 (34.9)	2.0 (35.6)	5.5 (41.9)	9.5 (49.1)	12.9 (55.2)	17.0 (62.6)	18.9 (66.0)	18.1 (64.6)	15.0 (59.0)	11.4 (52.5)	5.9 (42.6)	2.1 (35.8)	10.0 (50.0)
Mean daily minimum °C (°F)	−2.9 (26.8)	−3.5 (25.7)	−0.9 (30.4)	2.3 (36.1)	6.2 (43.2)	9.9 (49.8)	11.5 (52.7)	10.9 (51.6)	8.0 (46.4)	5.5 (41.9)	0.9 (33.6)	−2.5 (27.5)	3.8 (38.8)
Record low °C (°F)	−19.5 (−3.1)	−24.1 (−11.4)	−23.9 (−11.0)	−10.0 (14.0)	−4.9 (23.2)	−0.6 (30.9)	2.6 (36.7)	2.6 (36.7)	−1.8 (28.8)	−6.7 (19.9)	−14.8 (5.4)	−23.4 (−10.1)	−24.1 (−11.4)
Average precipitation mm (inches)	129.0 (5.08)	114.0 (4.49)	126.7 (4.99)	112.8 (4.44)	138.4 (5.45)	113.9 (4.48)	116.5 (4.59)	123.6 (4.87)	98.6 (3.88)	129.8 (5.11)	133.7 (5.26)	158.5 (6.24)	1,495.5 (58.88)
Average precipitation days (≥ 1.0 mm)	13.0	11.4	12.5	10.2	13.4	11.1	9.5	10.4	9.0	11.3	12.2	14.3	138.3
Source: Météo-France

=== Heraldry ===
Arms of Arbent	Blazon: Or, in chief a gusset couped of argent, in base a caliper with a branch to sinister all in sable debruised by two cutlasses of argent saltirewise with handles gules over all tied in Or.

== Communications and transport ==
=== Transport ===
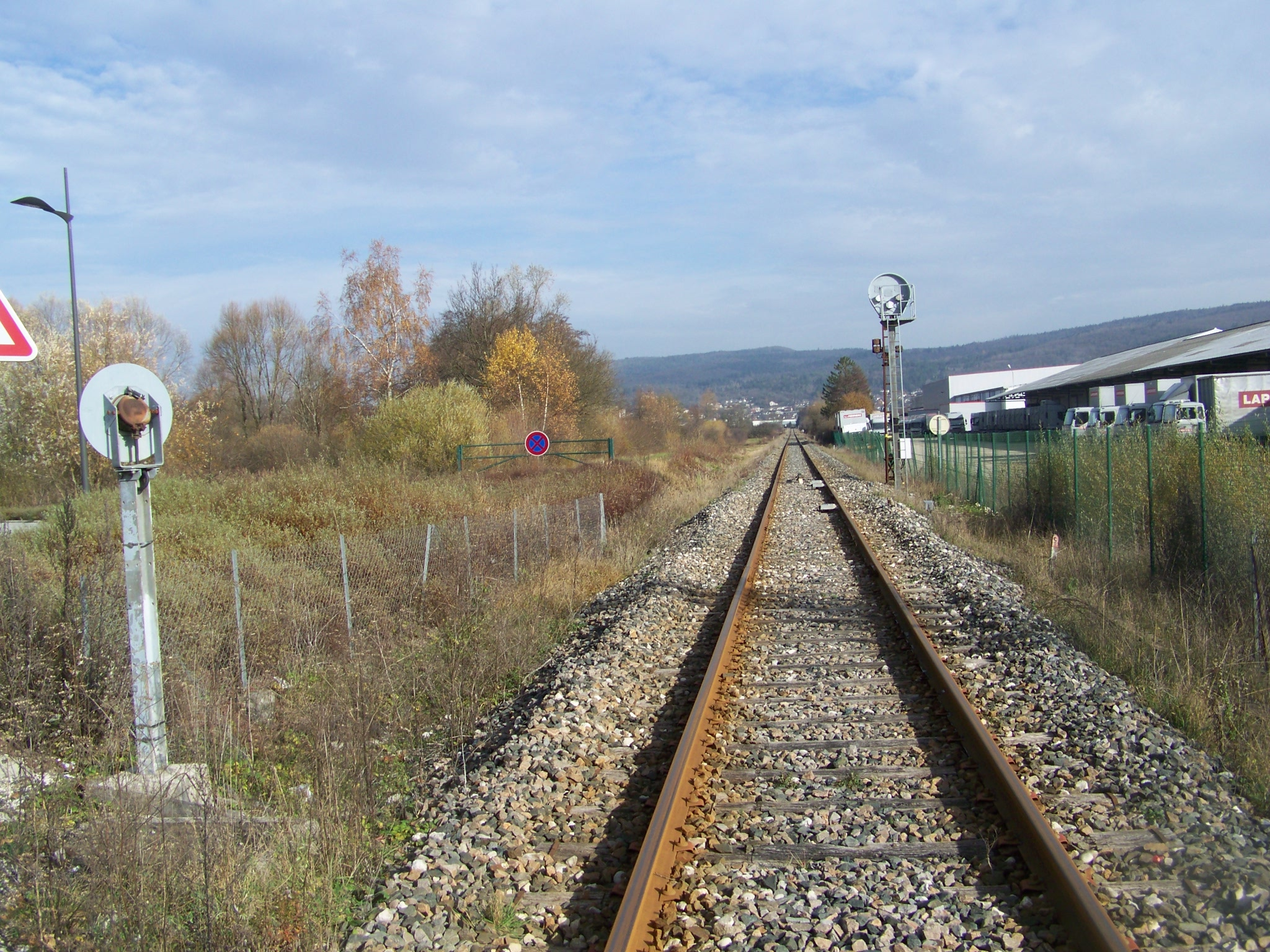
The railway from Oyonnax in Arbent

A bus runs regularly in the town. It comes from the neighbouring town of Oyonnax. A railway station previously existed in the town but the proximity of Oyonnax caused disinterest and it closed. Arbent is located on the Andelot-en-Montagne - La Cluse railway line.

=== Air transport ===
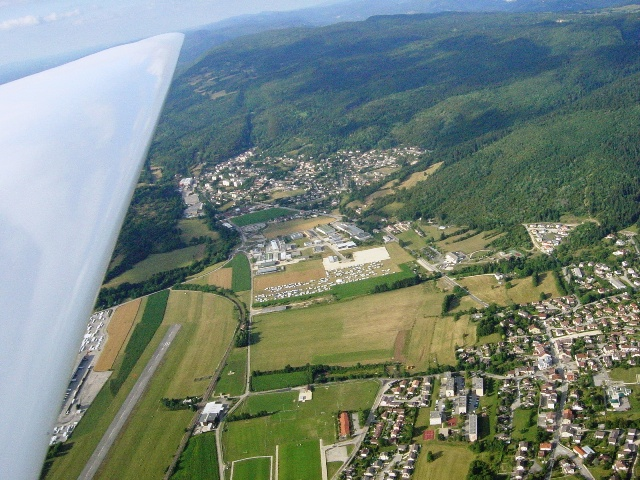
Aerial view of Arbent with the aerodrome visible

The commune has an aerodrome shared with the commune of Oyonnax. It can accommodate helicopters and business aircraft but is mostly used by the Jean Coutty Aeroclub for leisure and pilot training. An air show is held every year.

== Urban planning ==
=== Urban morphology ===
The commune of Arbent is divided into two areas. The first part is on the edge of the Jura department to the north. It is the location of the town hall. Two kilometres to the south is Marchon which is attached to the commune of Oyonnax.

=== Housing ===
The total number of dwellings in the town of 1182. Among these units, 96.4% are primary residences, 1.2% are second homes, and 2.5% are vacant housing. These lodging units are 60.1% of detached houses, 37.6% apartments, and only 2.3% are other types of housing. The proportion of people in their own home is 57.1%. This is higher than the national average which is 55.3%. As a result, the proportion of tenants is 39.5% of all housing which is inversely lower than the national average of 39.8%. It may also be noted that 3.4% of the population of the commune are people with free accommodation while at the level of the whole of France the average percentage is 4.9%. Of all the commune housing units: 1.3% are studio size, 9.7% are two bedroom accommodations, 19% have three bedrooms, 30.2% of homes have four bedrooms and 39.9% of homes have five or more bedrooms.

== Administration ==
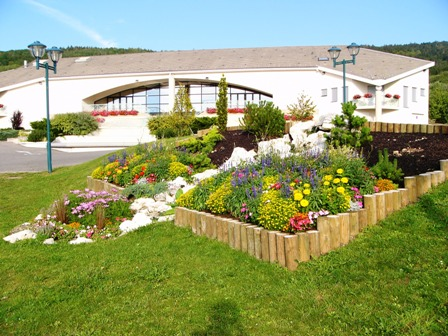
Arbent Community Hall

The municipal council of the commune is composed of 27 councillors. The executive consists of the mayor, Liliane Maissiat, and seven assistants, each with defined tasks. The First Assistant is responsible for financial and administrative affairs, employment, and economic forecasting. There is an assistant for education, for work related technical services. for communications, for public relations, for entertainment and cultural life, for urban planning, land use, environment and forest, for social affairs and housing, and finally for sports associations and life. Nineteen other councillors attend the municipal council.

List of mayors of Arbent

From	To	Name	Party
1993	2001	André Minery	
2001	2020	Liliane Maissiat	UMP then LR
2020	Incumbent	Philippe Cracchiolo	LR

=== Intercommunal relations ===
The commune has developed twinning in order to promote school exchanges, sporting, cultural, and social relations between Communes.

- Plouhinec, Finistère (France) since 28 May 2005.

== Population ==
Historical population
Year	Pop.	±% p.a.
1968	1,255	—
1975	1,400	+1.57%
1982	2,766	+10.22%
1990	3,369	+2.50%
1999	3,610	+0.77%
2007	3,443	−0.59%
2012	3,440	−0.02%
2017	3,367	−0.43%
2023	3,555	+0.91%
Source: INSEE

== Economy ==
=== Income and taxation ===
According to the INSEE survey in 1999, the average household income is EUR 22,015 per year, while the national average is 15,027 euros per year. There is no liability for the solidarity tax on wealth (ISF) in Nantua.

=== Employment ===
The population of Arbent is divided into 48.2% working, which is higher than the national average of 45.2%, and 10.5% retired, a figure lower than the 18.2% national average. There are also 30.5% of the population of young people in school and 10.8% of other people without work.

The working rate for the population 20 to 59 years old is 85% with a rate of unemployment of 9% in 1999 - well below the national average of 12.9% unemployed.

Distribution of employment by industry
	Agricultural	Trades, Shopkeepers, Company Managers	Intellectuals and Professionals	Intermediate Professions	Employees	Workers
Arbent	0%	7.2%	7.4%	18.3%	16.3%	50.8%
National Average	2.4%	6.4%	12.1%	22.1%	29.9%	27.1%
Source of data: INSEE

== Culture and heritage ==
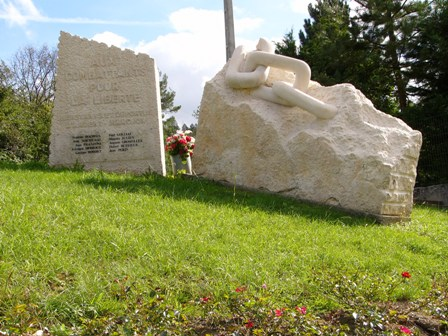
Monument to the Maquis

=== Civil heritage ===
The commune has a number of buildings and structures that are registered as historical monuments or historical objects:

- A Travellers Halt (1889)
- A Railway Bridge and 2 Tunnels at Rue du Point B (1886)
- A Railway Bridge in Montagre (1886)
- A Railway Crossing (No. 84) at Prés de Voye (1886)
- A Vaulted Aqueduct (1886)
- A Railway cutting Retaining Wall at Prés de Voye (1886)
- A Railway Bridge at Prés de Voye (1886)
- A Mechanical Disc Signal at Marais Sud (20th century)
- A Railway Telephone at Prés de Voye (20th century)

Other sites of interest

Other points of interest in Arbent include historical buildings, a sports complex, and walks in the surrounding woods.

=== Religious heritage ===
The Church of Saint Laurent (15th century) is registered as an historical monument. It contains a Lectern (17th century) which is registered as an historical object.

=== Gallery ===
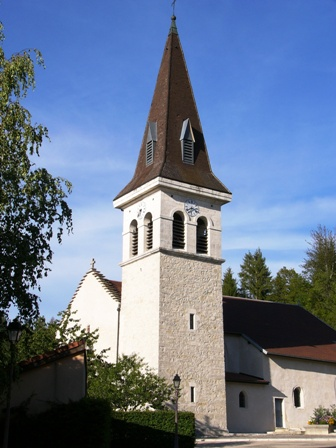
The Church of Saint-Laurent

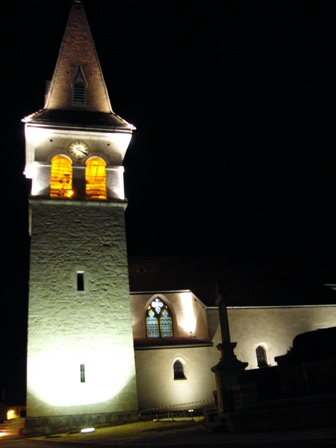

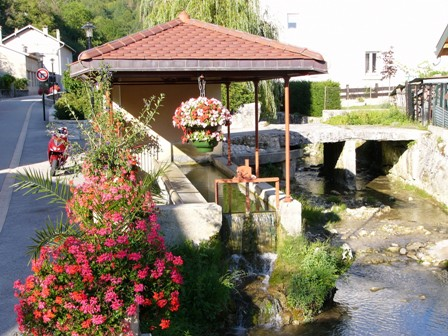
Old Lavoir at Marchon

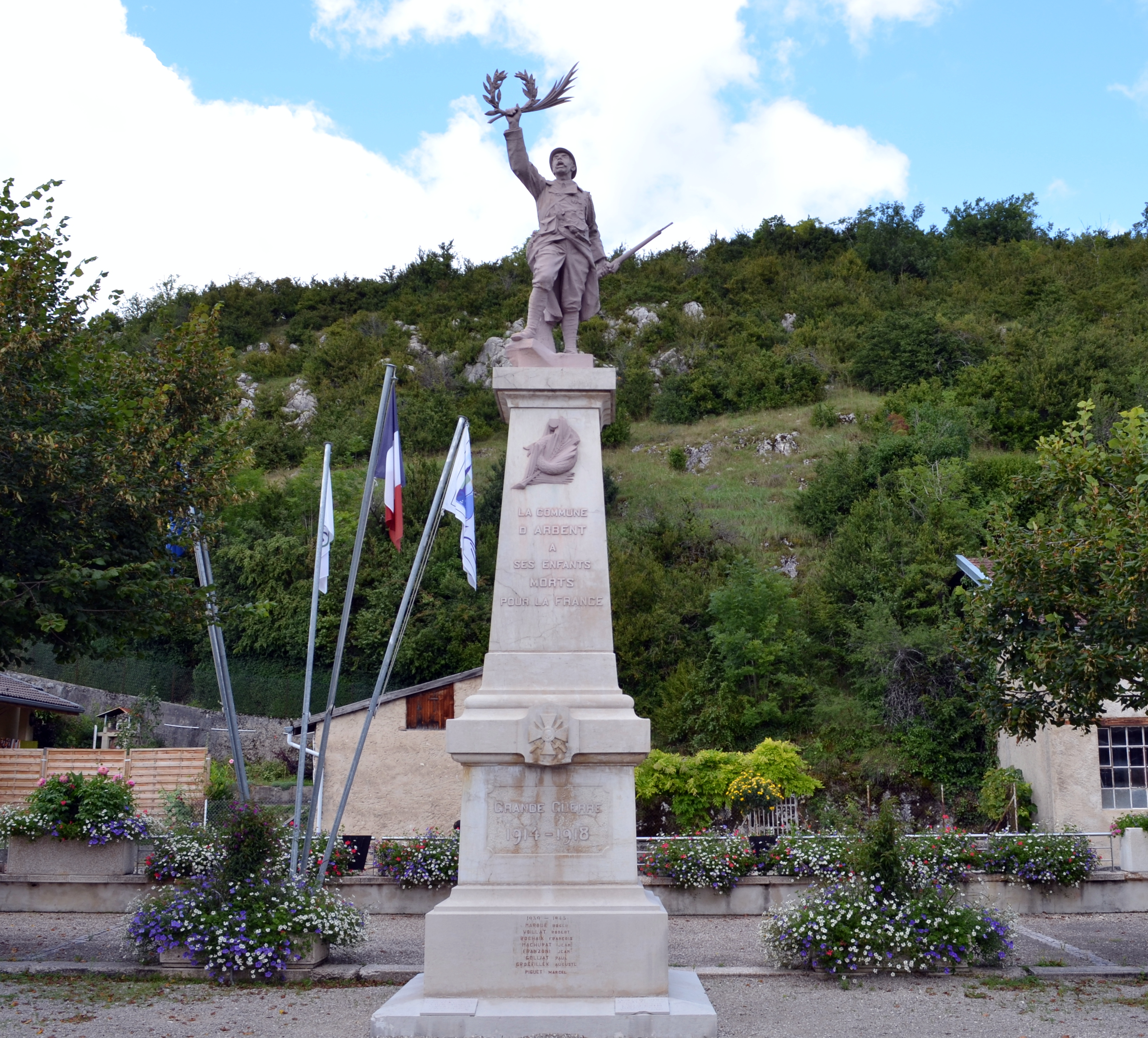
War Memorial

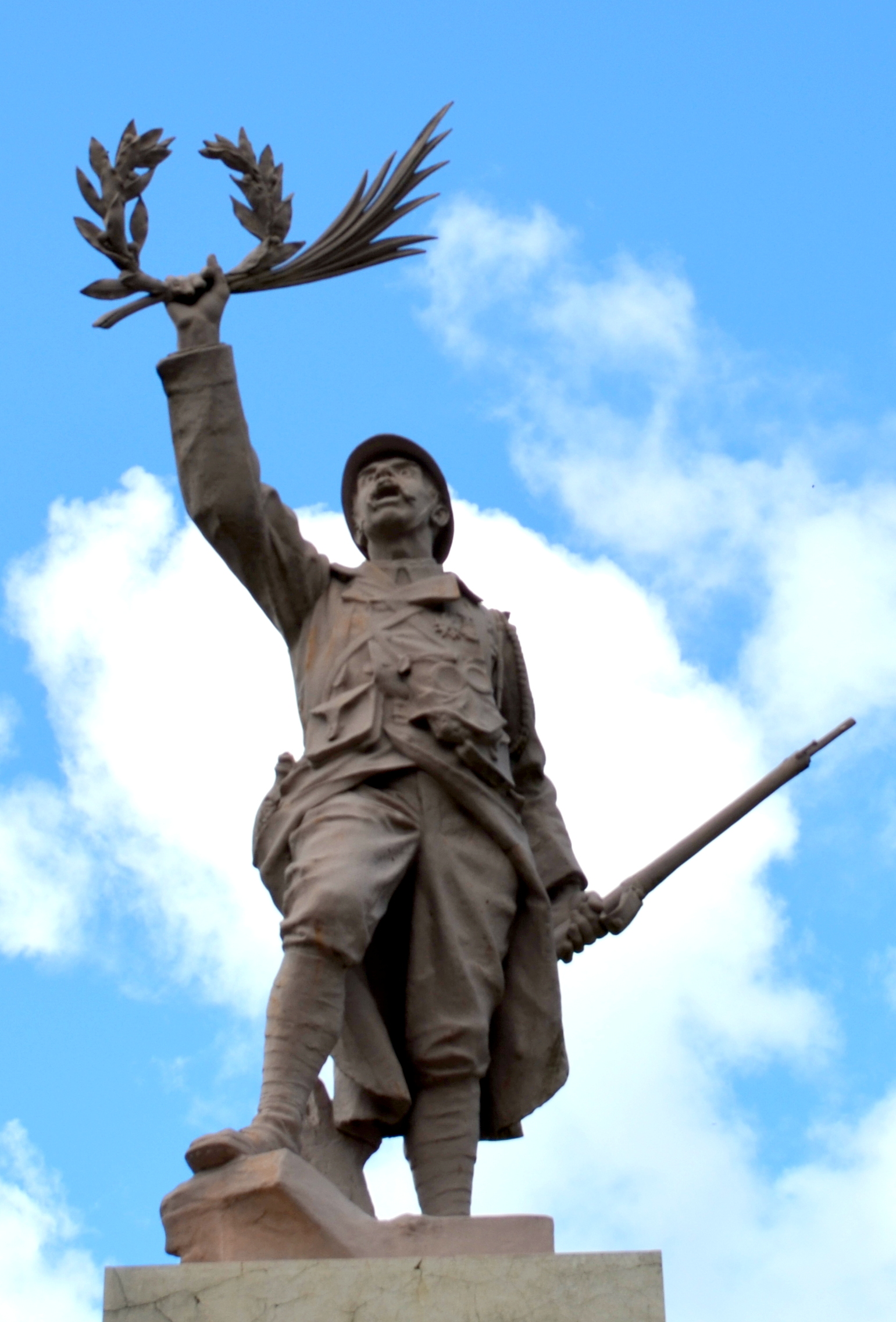
Statue on the War memorial
- The Chapel Saint-Oyen

== Facilities ==
=== Education ===
The Jean-Rostand College at Marchon is classified as a successful ambition.

=== Media ===
The newspaper Le Progrès publishes a local edition for the communes of Upper Bugey. It appears from Monday to Sunday and discusses various news, sporting, and cultural events at the local, national, and international levels.

The newspaper La Voix de l'Ain is a weekly publication offering local information for different regions of the department of Ain.

France 3 Rhône Alpes Auvergne is available in the region.

== Personalities ==
- Louis Aleman, French cardinal of the 15th century
- General Andrea, military man and French writer of the 20th century, author of The Druze revolt and the insurrection in Damascus, Payot, 1937

== See also ==
- Communes of the Ain department
