= Canton of Oyonnax =

Coordinates: 46.27°N 5.66°E

Oyonnax
- Canton
- Interactive map of Oyonnax
- Country: France
- Region: Auvergne-Rhône-Alpes
- Department: Ain
- No. of communes: {{{nbcomm}}}

Government
  - Representatives (2021–2028): Carmen Flore; Michel Perraud
- Area: 59.67 km^{2} (23.04 sq mi)
- Population (2023): 26,035
  - Density: 436.3/km^{2} (1,130/sq mi)
- INSEE code: 01 15

The canton of Oyonnax is an administrative division of the Ain department, in eastern France. It was created at the French canton reorganisation which came into effect in March 2015. Its seat is in Oyonnax.

== Composition ==
It consists of the following communes:

1. Arbent
2. Oyonnax

== Councillors ==
Election	Councillors	Party	Occupation
2015	Liliane Maissiat	LR	Mayor of Arbent
2015	Michel Perraud	UDI	Mayor of Oyonnax

== Pictures of the canton ==
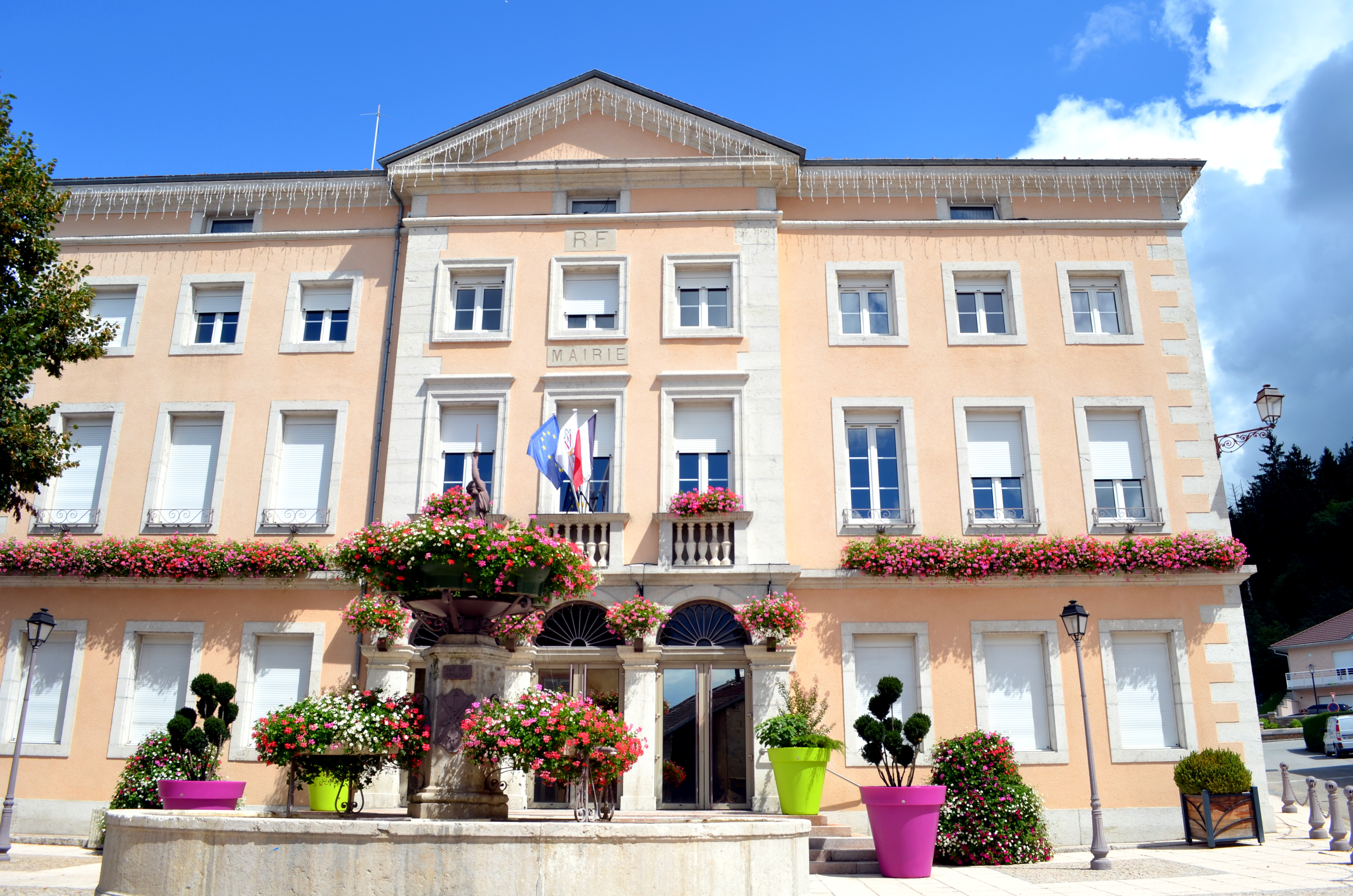
seat Hall of Arbent

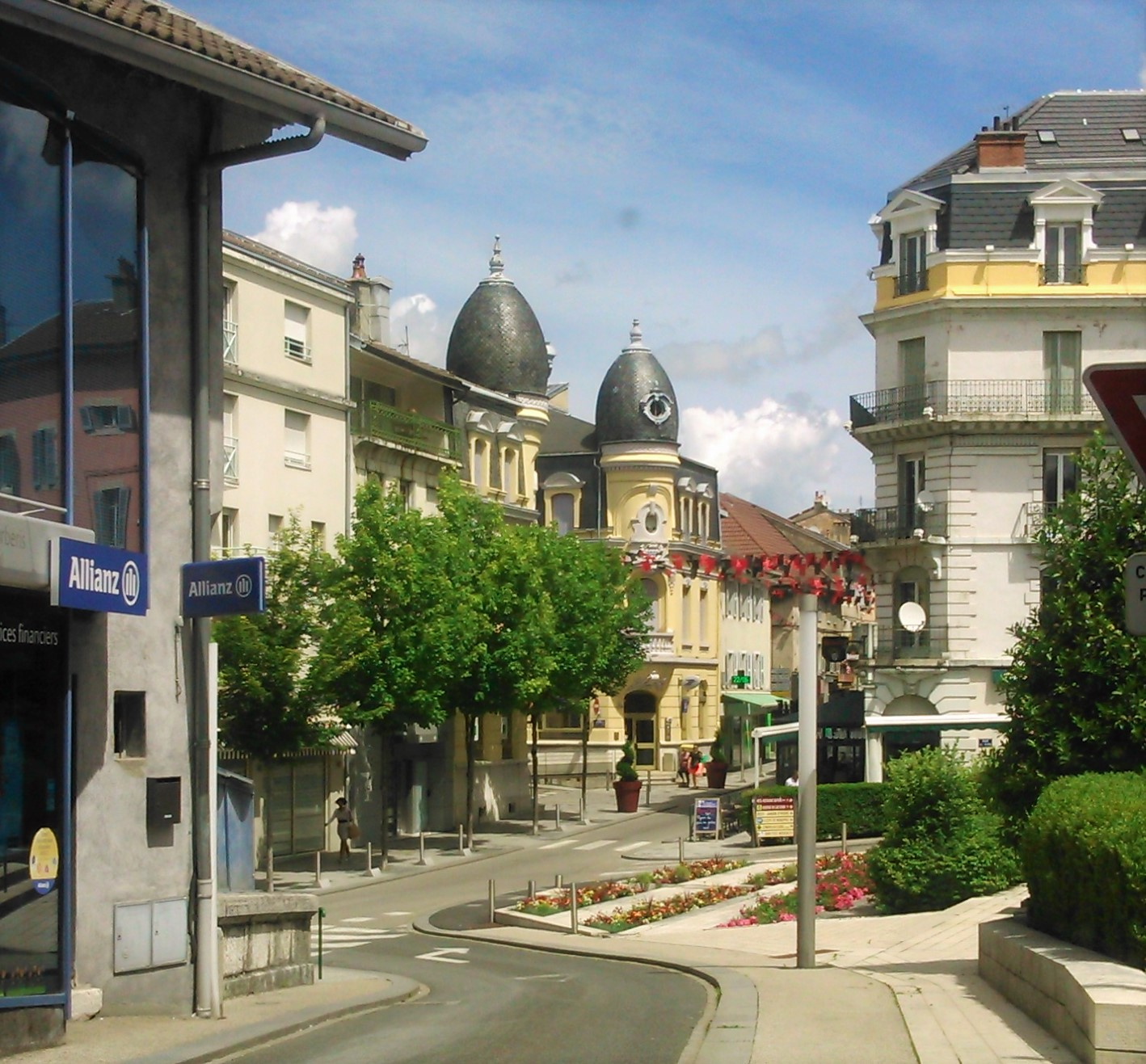
Street in Oyonnax
