= Mouvement de la Paix =

Peace organisation

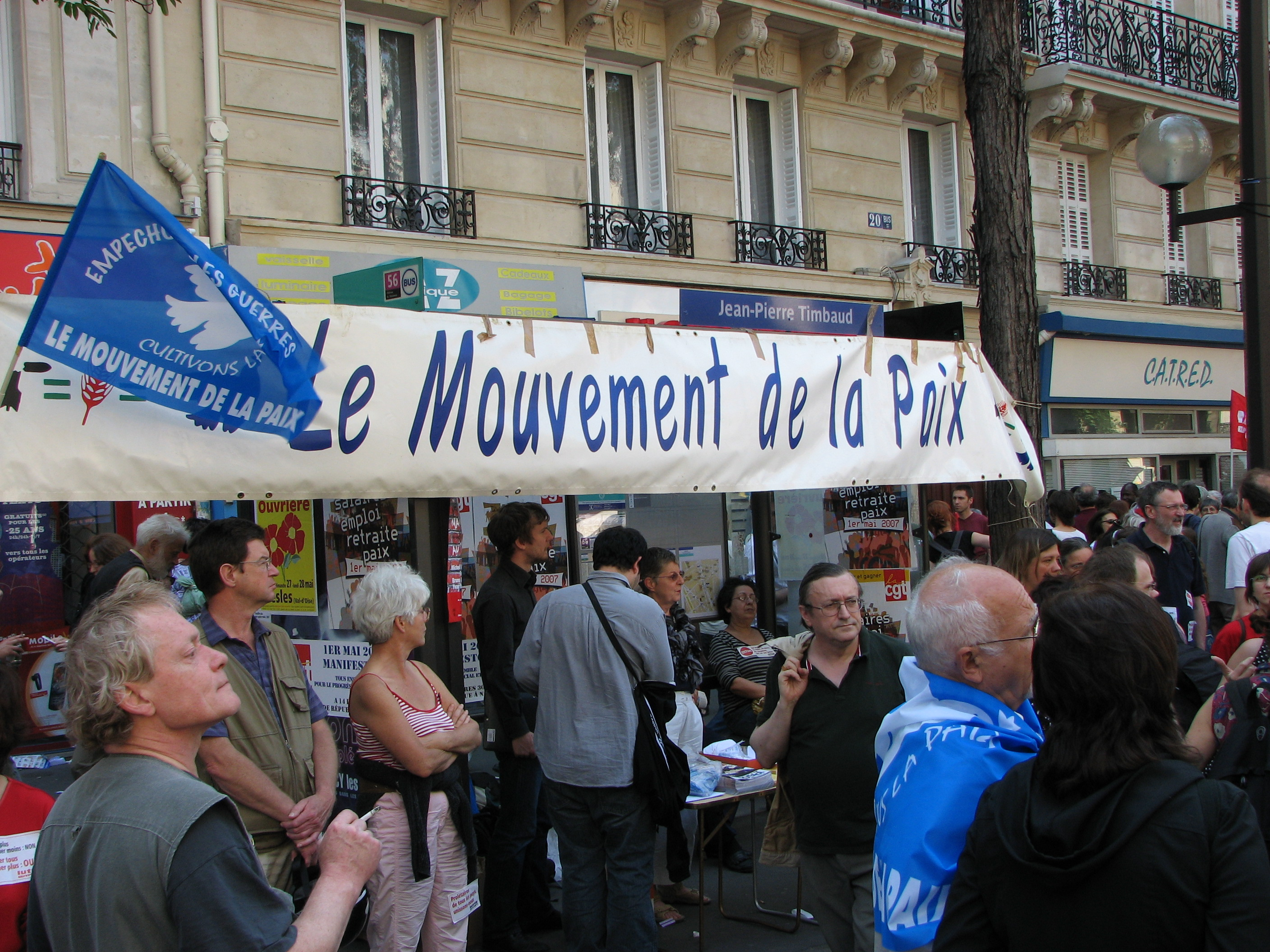
Mouvement de la Paix activists demonstrating on 1 May 2007

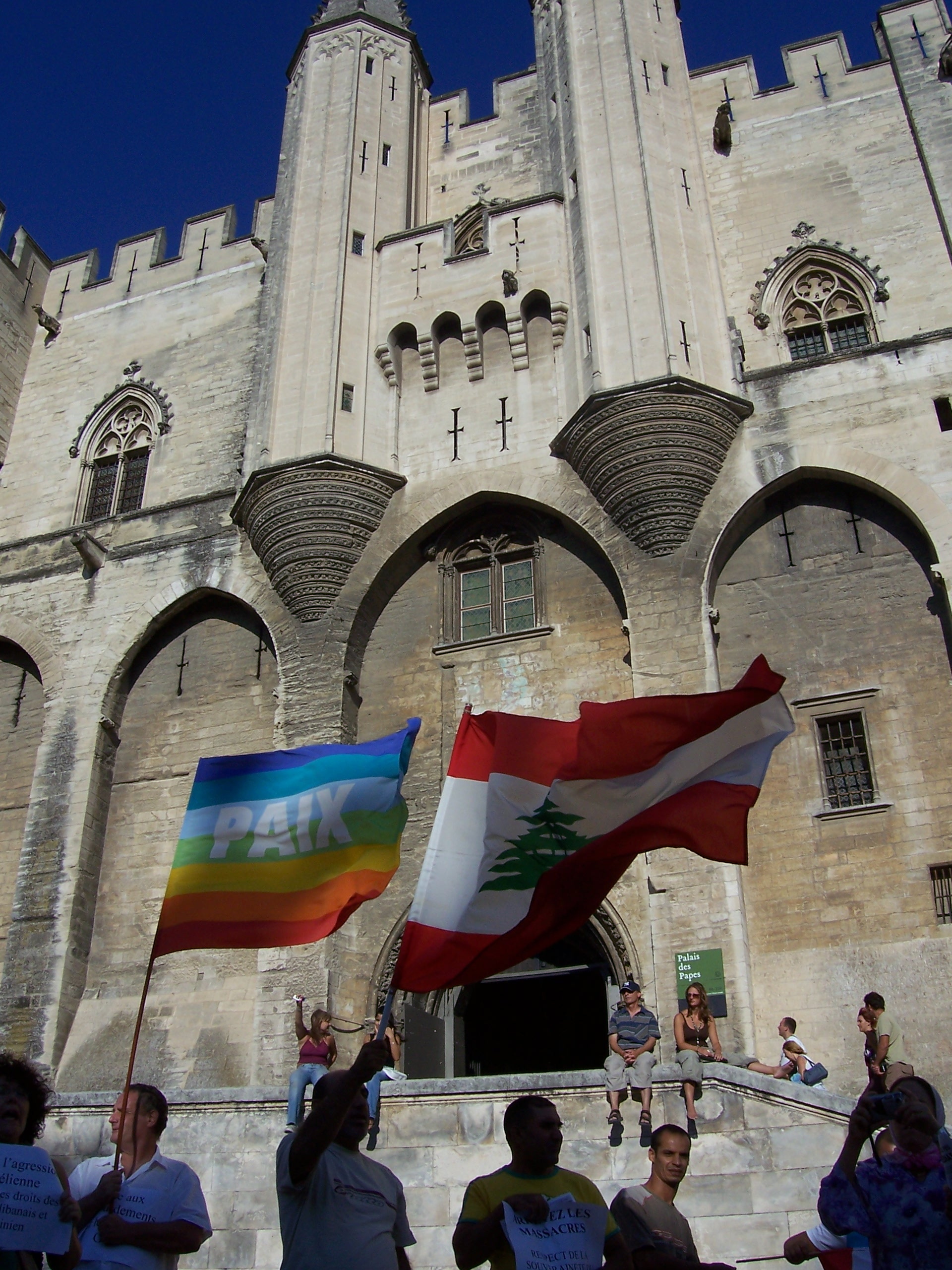
August 2006 demonstration organised by pacifist associations including Mouvement de la Paix in Avignon against the 2006 Lebanon War

The Mouvement de la Paix is an organisation which promotes a culture of peace initiated by the United Nations. The movement was created in the aftermath of the Second World War by the large resistance movements, particularly those associated with communists, Christians and free-thinkers, and was linked directly to the Mouvement mondial des partisans de la paix whose aim was to struggle for peace.

== Origins ==
The origin of the Movement was to be found in the creation of "Combattants de la Liberté" in the aftermath of the Second World War. It was the communist leader, Charles Tillon who, at the end of 1947, launched an appeal for the creation of an organisation devoted to "supporting the republican régime and preventing the return of fascism and dictatorship". On 22 February 1948, about 60 people who had been active in the resistance founded "les Combattants de la Liberté" in a meeting at the l'Hôtel des 2 Mondes in Paris. The leader was to be Yves Farge whoa had been appointed prefect of the Rhône-Alpes region by Charles de Gaulle at the liberation of France. The constitution of this young movement which aimed to preserve the resistance spirit of unity was laid down by Raymond Aubrac.

After the 1948 Congrès des peuples pour la paix de Wroclaw, the Mouvement mondial des partisans de la paix was formed, and encouraged the creation of national committees. In France, the "Combattants de la Liberté", which had become "les Combattants de la Liberté et de la Paix", then "les Combattants de la Paix et de la Liberté" finally in 1951 became "le conseil national français du Mouvement de la Paix", commonly known as the "Mouvement de la Paix".

== The Cold War years ==
The period of the Cold War was for the Movement the most rich in operations, influence and effect. The Movement participated in the 1949 Congrès mondial des Partisans de la Paix in Paris, at which the World Peace Council was created. The leadership was given to the intellectual and scientist Frédéric Joliot-Curie. The Movement organised a massive campaign of support in France for the Stockholm appeal which gathered millions of signatures, including that of Jacques Chirac. The Stockholm campaign marked the apogee of the Movement in France.

The Movement subsequently became radicalised, and lost some of its popular influence. Several campaigns followed, against the Korean War (1950, the demonstration against Matthew Ridgway), or against German rearmament under the European Defence Community (from 1952 onwards).

== Other campaigns ==
The year 1956 marked the beginning of destalinization, which overturned the communist landscape in Europe. The Movement lost some of its energy, particularly after its campaign against the Algerian war.

The flame revived during the Vietnam War and again with the NATO Double-Track Decision in the 1980s. The Movement also obtained the first disarmament agreement dealing with short and long range missiles in Europe. In 1995, the Movement participated in a massive international campaign aimed at closing down the Centre d'Expérimentation du Pacifique in Mururoa.

Since 2000 the Movement has energised a large anti-war constituency (Afghanistan, Iraq, the near east etc). Very active in the alter-globalization movement and in international partnerships, the Movement supports Mayors for Peace in France, and the French PNND (Parlementaires pour la non-prolifération et le désarmement nucléaire, Parliamentarians for Nuclear Non-Proliferation and Disarmament). The Movement is a member of the World Peace Council, of the International Peace Bureau, of Abolition 2000 and of the International Association of Educators for Peace.

== The Movement today ==
The Movement is today the most important pacifist non-governmental organization in France with almost 150 local committees. It frequently coordinates anti-war coalitions and invests heavily in the young. International peace day on the 21 September marks one of its annual high points.

The Movement seems to have experienced a rally since the 2003 Iraq war and the development of alter-globalization movements. It plays an important role in organizing European social fora, and has mobilized against the Iraq war, the situations in Chechnya and Israel, and against nuclear weapons with a campaign for a non-proliferation treaty. The movement is appealing for a reduction in the defense budget. For several years, in response to urban violence, the Movement has promoted the idea of committees for culture and peace in city wards.

== Magazine ==
After over 50 years and 500 issues, the Movement's magazine, Combat pour la Paix (fight for peace) changed its name to Planète Paix (Planet Peace) in March 2005.

== Notable members ==
- Yves Farge, president until his death in 1953
- Charles Tillon, Laurent Casanova, Maurice Kriegel-Valrimont, Raymond Guyot and André Souquière, communist officials; Emmanuel d'Astier de la Vigerie, Robert Chambeiron, Pierre Cot and Pierre Villon, parliamentarians for the now defunct Union progressiste party; Yvonne Dumont, Henri Caillavet, André Armengaud, other parliamentarians; Benoit Frachon and Louis Saillant, officials for the CGT union
- Frédéric Joliot-Curie and Eugénie Cotton, scientists; Pablo Picasso and Jean Effel, artists
- Jean-Paul Sartre, Simone de Beauvoir, Louis Aragon, Elsa Triolet, Hervé Bazin, Vercors, Maurice Druon, André Stil, Jean-Marie Domenach, Jean Cassou and Michel Leiris, writers
- Yves Montand, Simone Signoret, Michel Piccoli, Pierre Mondy, Claude Piéplu, Bernard Blier, actors; Francis Lemarque and Juliette Gréco, singers
- Lucie Aubrac, Jean Pierre-Bloch and Marie-Claude Vaillant-Couturier, members of the resistance
- Abbé Jean Boulier, prètre rouge ("Red priest")
- Jacques Denis
- Pierre-Luc Séguillon
- Daniel Cirera; Jacques Le Dauphin
- Daniel Durand, national secretary 1994-2002
- Arielle Denis and Pierre Villard, co-presidents since 2002.

== See also ==
- List of anti-war organizations
- World Peace Council

== Bibliography ==
- (in French) Olivier Le Cour Grandmaison, Le Mouvement de la paix pendant la guerre froide : le cas français (1948–1952), in. Communisme magazine, no. 18-19, 1988, p. 120-138.
- (in French) Stéphane Courtois, Le Mouvement de la paix, in. Jean François Sirinelli (dir.), Dictionnaire de la vie politique française au XX siècle, PUF, Paris, 2005 (1st edition, 1995).
- (in French) Yves Santamaria, Le parti de l'ennemi? : Le Parti communiste français dans la lutte pour la paix (1947–1958), Armand Colin, Paris, 2006, 373 p.
