= Oyonnax =

Commune in Auvergne-Rhône-Alpes, France

- Commune
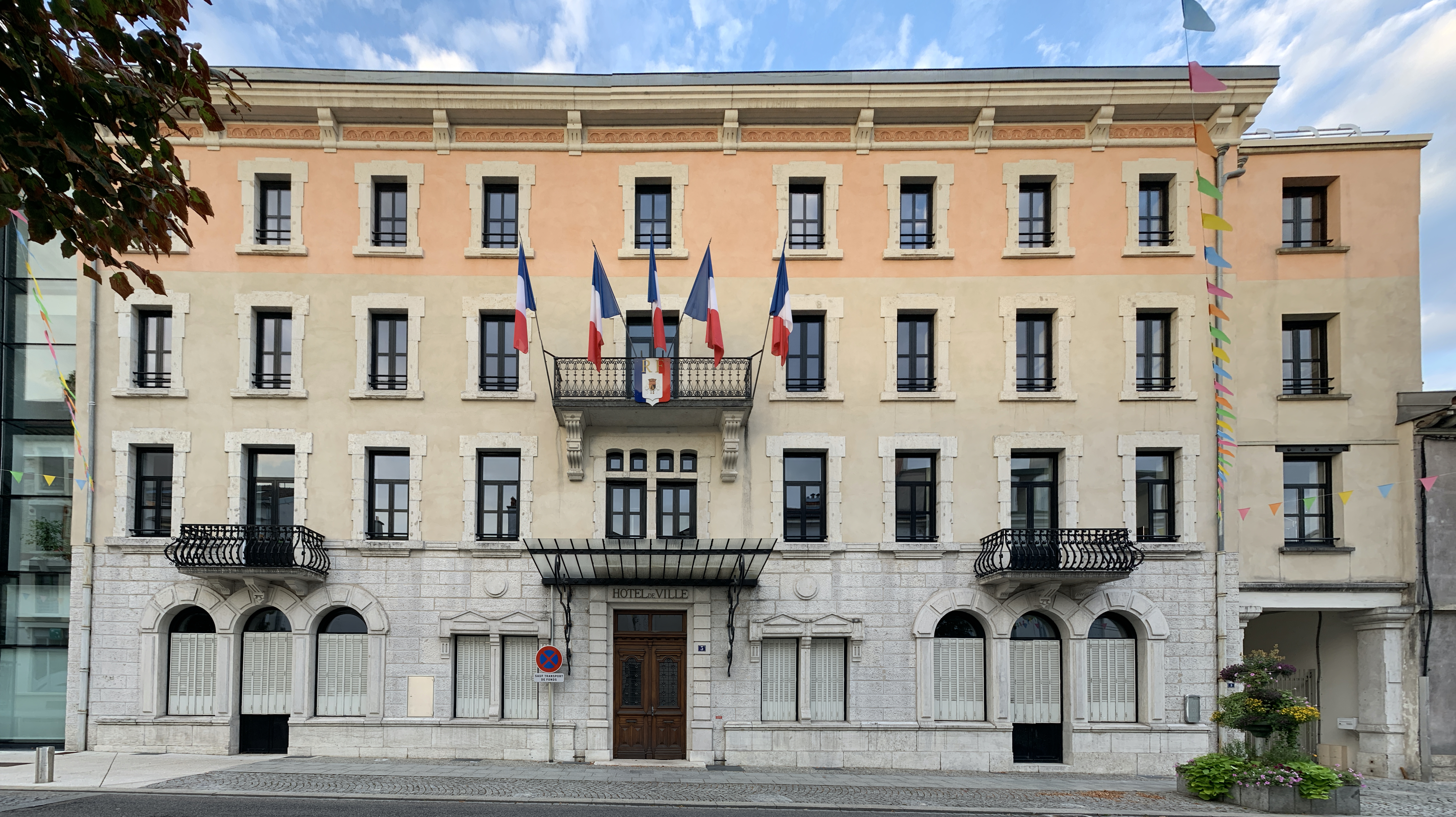
- The Hôtel de Ville

- Coat of arms
- Location of Oyonnax
- Location within France Location within Auvergne-Rhône-Alpes
- Coordinates: 46°15′22″N 5°39′20″E
- Country: France
- Region: Auvergne-Rhône-Alpes
- Department: Ain
- Arrondissement: Nantua
- Canton: Oyonnax
- Intercommunality: Haut-Bugey Agglomération

Government
  - Mayor (2020–2026): Michel Perraud
- Area^{1}: 35.99 km^{2} (13.90 sq mi)
- Elevation: 540 m (1,770 ft)
- Highest elevation: 1,082 m (3,550 ft)
- Lowest elevation: 440 m (1,440 ft)
- Population (2023): 22,480
  - Density: 624.6/km^{2} (1,618/sq mi)
- Demonym: Oyonnaxiens
- Time zone: UTC+01:00 (CET)
  - Summer (DST): UTC+02:00 (CEST)
- INSEE/Postal code: 01283 /01100
- Website: www.oyonnax.fr
- ^{1} French Land Register data, which excludes lakes, ponds, glaciers > 1 km^{2} (0.386 sq mi or 247 acres) and river estuaries.

Oyonnax (French pronunciation: [ɔjɔna]) is the second most populated commune in the Ain department in the Auvergne-Rhône-Alpes region in eastern France.

Oyonnax lies in a valley of the Jura Mountains in the far north of Ain. It is near the Parc naturel régional du Haut-Jura. The city is on the river Ange.

Its prominence in the plastics industry has earned it the name Plastics Valley.

One of the outstanding achievements of the French Résistance occurred here on 11 November 1943, when the Maquis de l'Ain et du Haut-Jura defied the German occupiers to hold an 11 November parade and memorial service in honour of French soldiers from World War I.

The town was awarded the Médaille de la Résistance on 16 June 1947.

== History ==
=== Toponymy ===
The name Oyonnax possibly derives from the Celtic ivos, and the Latin -acum, meaning 'place of the yew'.

=== Monopoly in wooden comb manufacture ===
In 630, Clovis II, the son of Dagobert I king of the Franks, travelled to Geneva to meet the king of Burgundy. He met a young slave there, the daughter of a captured Saxon king, and wished to ask for her as his wife. So Dagobert I sent a delegation including Léger d'Autun to ask the king of Burgundy for her hand and bring her back to Paris.

Near Oyonnax, at a place called Sous-Nierme, the litter of Léger d'Autun broke and wounded the head of his escort. Inhabitants of Oyonnax cared for him and repaired the vehicle. The delegation set out again with gifts made by the inhabitants of Oyonnax. In recognition, Léger d'Autun, become a bishop and counselor to queen Bathilde, gave the town the privilege of manufacturing wooden combs. Saint-Léger also became the patron saint feast of Oyonnax.

=== Development ===
Belonging in the Middle Ages to the lords of Thoire, Oyonnax was then no more than an agricultural village for centuries. (It had 52 inhabitants in 1601).

The first development began starting in the 17th century, thanks to its artisans: woodworking and carved horn. The second came with the industrial revolution in the 19th century: Oyonnax became an industrial town, with businesses that sold their goods all over Europe. The railway arrived in 1885.

The Hôtel Varin, which later became the Hôtel de Ville, was completed in around 1899.

== Transport ==
The town is served by the A404 autoroute.

Oyonnax railway station is located on the railway line between Montréal-la-Cluse and Andelot-en-Montagne, and is served by trains towards Bourg-en-Bresse.

The nearest airports are Geneva Airport, located 91 km (57 mi) to the east and Lyon–Saint-Exupéry Airport, located 93 km (58 mi) to the south west of the town.

== Tourism ==
The town has a cultural centre, including cinemas, concert halls, and a "Museum of the Comb and of the Plastics Industry". Tourist activities include hiking, canoeing and cross-country skiing among the forests, hills and lakes of the area.

== Sport ==
The city has a rugby union team, Oyonnax Rugby, that has been promoted to the Division 1 Top 14 in 2013, 2017 and again in 2023. The team plays at the Stade Charles-Mathon.

== Demographics ==
Historical population

| Year | Pop. | ±% p.a. |
|---|---|---|
| 1793 | 1,099 | — |
| 1800 | 1,178 | +1.00% |
| 1806 | 1,275 | +1.33% |
| 1821 | 1,207 | −0.36% |
| 1831 | 1,974 | +5.04% |
| 1836 | 2,279 | +2.92% |
| 1841 | 2,593 | +2.62% |
| 1846 | 2,608 | +0.12% |
| 1851 | 3,245 | +4.47% |
| 1856 | 3,342 | +0.59% |
| 1861 | 3,501 | +0.93% |
| 1866 | 3,547 | +0.26% |
| 1872 | 3,272 | −1.34% |
| 1876 | 3,530 | +1.92% |
| 1881 | 3,847 | +1.73% |
| 1886 | 4,231 | +1.92% |
| 1891 | 4,461 | +1.06% |
| 1896 | 4,652 | +0.84% |
| 1901 | 6,140 | +5.71% |

| Year | Pop. | ±% p.a. |
|---|---|---|
| 1906 | 7,851 | +5.04% |
| 1911 | 9,557 | +4.01% |
| 1921 | 10,083 | +0.54% |
| 1926 | 11,617 | +2.87% |
| 1931 | 11,336 | −0.49% |
| 1936 | 10,166 | −2.16% |
| 1946 | 10,156 | −0.01% |
| 1954 | 11,773 | +1.86% |
| 1962 | 14,830 | +2.93% |
| 1968 | 19,777 | +4.91% |
| 1975 | 23,007 | +2.18% |
| 1982 | 22,739 | −0.17% |
| 1990 | 23,869 | +0.61% |
| 1999 | 24,162 | +0.14% |
| 2007 | 23,490 | −0.35% |
| 2012 | 22,436 | −0.91% |
| 2017 | 22,427 | −0.01% |
| 2023 | 22,480 | +0.04% |

Source: EHESS and INSEE (1968–2023)

== Twin towns – sister cities ==
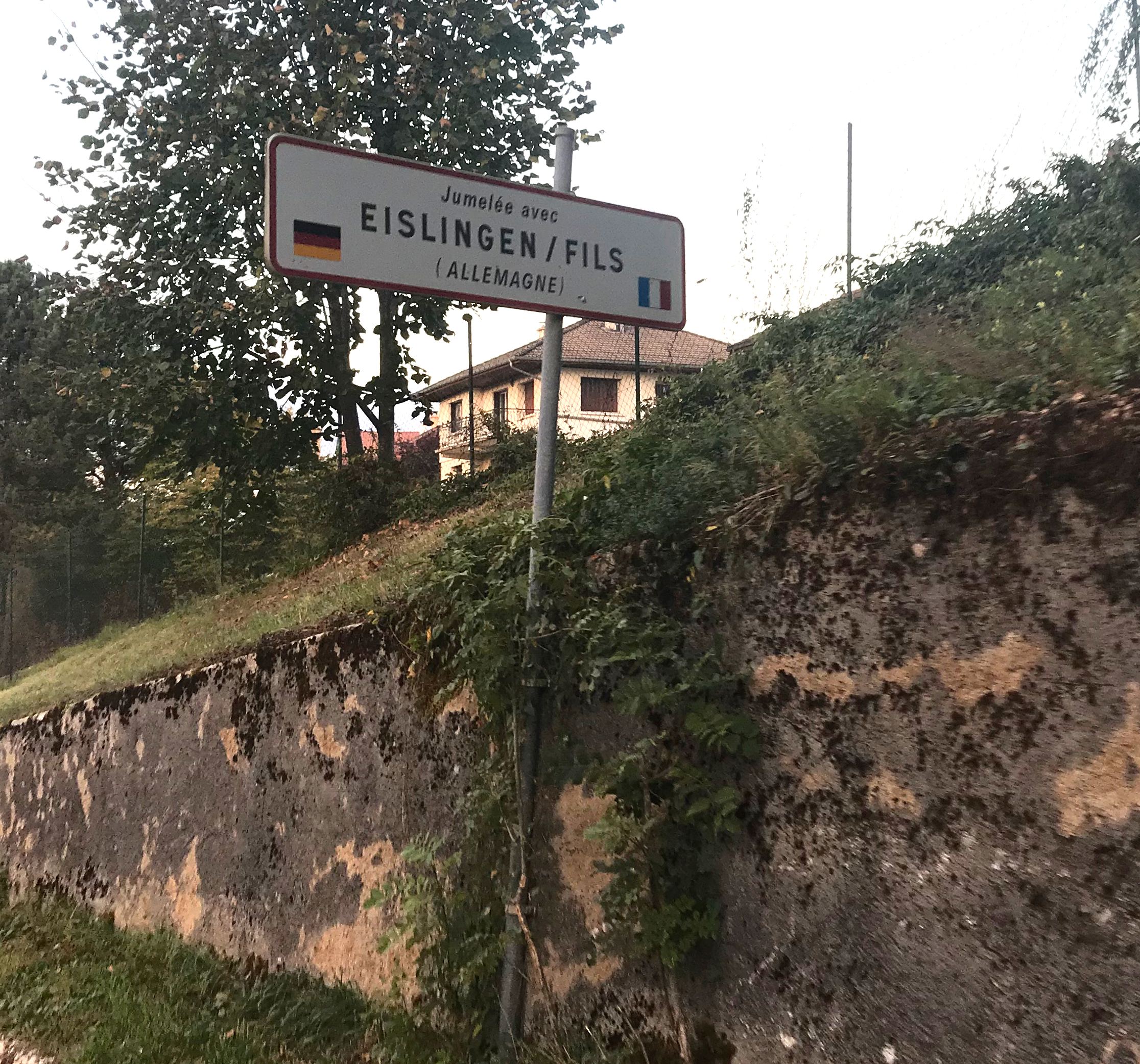
Twin sign in Oyonnax indicating Eislingen/Fils

Oyonnax is twinned with Eislingen/Fils, Germany since 2001.

== Personalities ==
- Éric Barone (born 1960), sportsman, beat the world speed record descending on a bicycle, both on snow and soil.
- Paul Collomb (1921–2010), painter
- Léger-Félicité Sonthonax (1763–1813), politician and abolitionist during the French Revolution

== Climate ==
Climate data for Oyonnax/Arbent, elevation 534 m (1,752 ft), (2004–2020 normals, extremes 2004–present)
| Month | Jan | Feb | Mar | Apr | May | Jun | Jul | Aug | Sep | Oct | Nov | Dec | Year |
|---|---|---|---|---|---|---|---|---|---|---|---|---|---|
| Record high °C (°F) | 17.7 (63.9) | 22.1 (71.8) | 25.1 (77.2) | 28.0 (82.4) | 32.6 (90.7) | 37.1 (98.8) | 39.2 (102.6) | 38.0 (100.4) | 33.1 (91.6) | 29.1 (84.4) | 23.9 (75.0) | 18.7 (65.7) | 39.2 (102.6) |
| Mean daily maximum °C (°F) | 6.1 (43.0) | 7.5 (45.5) | 12.0 (53.6) | 16.7 (62.1) | 19.6 (67.3) | 24.0 (75.2) | 26.3 (79.3) | 25.3 (77.5) | 21.9 (71.4) | 17.3 (63.1) | 11.0 (51.8) | 6.7 (44.1) | 16.2 (61.2) |
| Daily mean °C (°F) | 1.6 (34.9) | 2.0 (35.6) | 5.5 (41.9) | 9.5 (49.1) | 12.9 (55.2) | 17.0 (62.6) | 18.9 (66.0) | 18.1 (64.6) | 15.0 (59.0) | 11.4 (52.5) | 5.9 (42.6) | 2.1 (35.8) | 10.0 (50.0) |
| Mean daily minimum °C (°F) | −2.9 (26.8) | −3.5 (25.7) | −0.9 (30.4) | 2.3 (36.1) | 6.2 (43.2) | 9.9 (49.8) | 11.5 (52.7) | 10.9 (51.6) | 8.0 (46.4) | 5.5 (41.9) | 0.9 (33.6) | −2.5 (27.5) | 3.8 (38.8) |
| Record low °C (°F) | −19.5 (−3.1) | −24.1 (−11.4) | −23.9 (−11.0) | −10.0 (14.0) | −4.9 (23.2) | −0.6 (30.9) | 2.6 (36.7) | 2.6 (36.7) | −1.8 (28.8) | −6.7 (19.9) | −14.8 (5.4) | −23.4 (−10.1) | −24.1 (−11.4) |
| Average precipitation mm (inches) | 129.0 (5.08) | 114.0 (4.49) | 126.7 (4.99) | 112.8 (4.44) | 138.4 (5.45) | 113.9 (4.48) | 116.5 (4.59) | 123.6 (4.87) | 98.6 (3.88) | 129.8 (5.11) | 133.7 (5.26) | 158.5 (6.24) | 1,495.5 (58.88) |
| Average precipitation days (≥ 1.0 mm) | 13.0 | 11.4 | 12.5 | 10.2 | 13.4 | 11.1 | 9.5 | 10.4 | 9.0 | 11.3 | 12.2 | 14.3 | 138.3 |
Source: Meteociel

== See also ==
- Communes of the Ain department
