= Yves Farge =

French journalist and politician

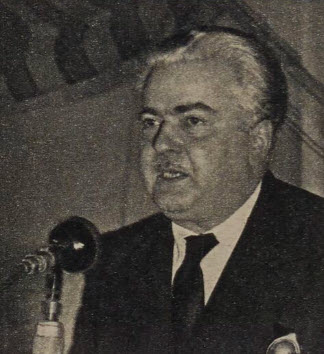

Yves Farge (19 August 1899, Salon-de-Provence, Bouches-du-Rhône − 31 March 1953, Tbilisi) was a French journalist and politician.

== Biography ==
Farge was a journalist for the Progrès de Lyon. His colleague, Georges Altman, put him in contact with the French Resistance movement Franc-tireur. In 1942, Farge met Jean Moulin. Farge was put in charge of the military organization of the massif du Vercors. He was also a member of the l’état-major directed by General Delestraint. After the arrest of those two prominent resistance figures, Farge was sought by the Gestapo and went to Paris, where he presided over the Comité d’action contre la déportation.

General Charles de Gaulle named Farge commissaire de la République for the departements of la région rhodanienne. Farge saved 800 hostages who were at risk of being shot at Montluc Prison in Lyon.

Farge was politically left-wing without having any specific affiliation. He served as minister of ravitaillement, a very difficult position, in the provisional government of Georges Bidault, from 8 January to 16 December 1946. He spoke out against wine smuggling and struggled hard against the black market.

Farge was a progressive, and close to the communists. He participated in the founding of the Mouvement de la Paix in 1947, of which he became the president until his death in 1953 in a car accident in Georgia. He was also a member of the World Peace Council. For his actions in support of peace, he was awarded the Stalin Peace Prize in 1953.

Farge was a compagnon de la Libération.

== Sources ==
- Dominique Veillon, article on Yves Farge taken from the Dictionnaire historique de la résistance directed by François Marcot, Robert Laffont, 2006 (French)

== Bibliography ==
Farge is responsible for a number of French works:

- Toulon, Editions de Minuit, Paris 1943
- Sauvons nos gosses. À Megève, premier village d'enfants, Lyon, 1945
- Vent des fous, Paris 1946
- Rebelles, soldats et citoyens. Souvenirs d'un Commissaire de la République, Paris 1946
- Lettre au Président Truman, Paris 1949
- La République est en danger, Paris 1950
- La Guerre d'Hitler continue, Paris 1950
- Le sang de la corruption, Paris 1951
- Témoignage sur la Chine et la Corée, Paris 1952
- Un simple mot, Paris 1953
- Histoire vécue de la Résistance. Rebelle soldat et citoyen, carnet d'un Commissaire de la République, Genève 1971
