= Salornay-sur-Guye =

- Commune
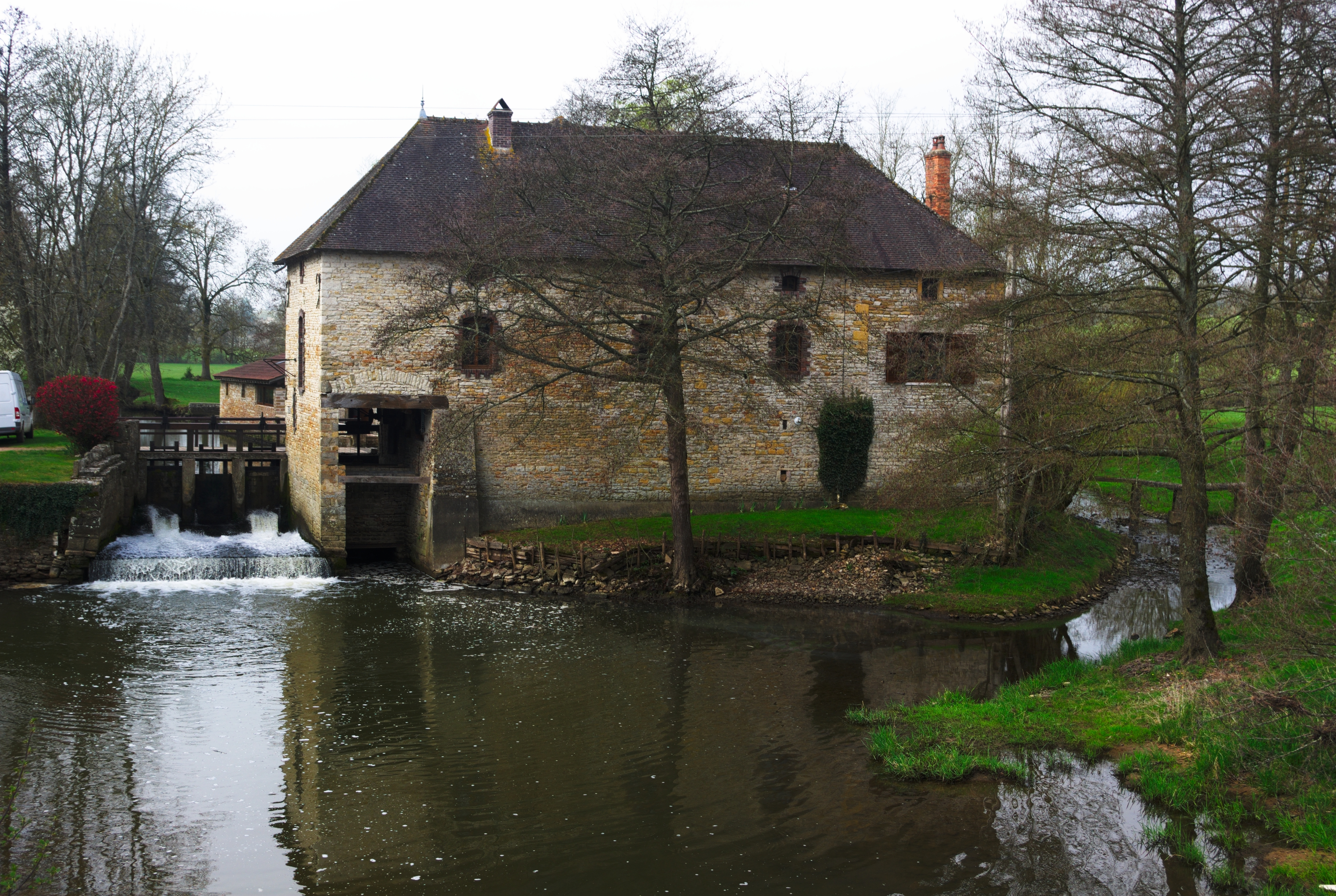
- Mill
- Location of Salornay-sur-Guye
- Location within France Location within Bourgogne-Franche-Comté
- Coordinates: 46°31′12″N 4°35′51″E
- Country: France
- Region: Bourgogne-Franche-Comté
- Department: Saône-et-Loire
- Arrondissement: Mâcon
- Canton: Cluny
- Area^{1}: 11.02 km^{2} (4.25 sq mi)
- Elevation: 210 m (690 ft)
- Highest elevation: 412 m (1,352 ft)
- Lowest elevation: 202 m (663 ft)
- Population (2023): 864
  - Density: 78.4/km^{2} (203/sq mi)
- Time zone: UTC+01:00 (CET)
  - Summer (DST): UTC+02:00 (CEST)
- INSEE/Postal code: 71495 /71250
- ^{1} French Land Register data, which excludes lakes, ponds, glaciers > 1 km^{2} (0.386 sq mi or 247 acres) and river estuaries.

Salornay-sur-Guye (French pronunciation: [salɔʁnɛ syʁ ɡi], literally Salornay on Guye) is a commune in the Saône-et-Loire department in the region of Bourgogne-Franche-Comté in eastern France.

== See also ==
- Communes of the Saône-et-Loire department
