= 2015 Critérium du Dauphiné =

Cycling race in deutsch

2015 UCI World Tour, race 16 of 28
- The route of the 2015 Critérium du Dauphiné

Race details
- Dates: 7–14 June
- Stages: 8
- Distance: 1,213 km (754 mi)
- Winning time: 30h 59' 02"

Results
| Jersey awarded to the overall winner | Winner | Chris Froome (GBR) | (Team Sky) |
| | Second | Tejay van Garderen (USA) | (BMC Racing Team) |
| | Third | Rui Costa (POR) | (Lampre–Merida) |
| Jersey awarded to the points classification winner | Points | Nacer Bouhanni (FRA) | (Cofidis) |
| Jersey awarded to the mountains classification winner | Mountains | Daniel Teklehaimanot (ERI) | (MTN–Qhubeka) |
| Jersey awarded to the young rider classification winner | Young rider | Simon Yates (GBR) | (Orica–GreenEDGE) |
| | Team | Movistar Team | |

The 2015 Critérium du Dauphiné was the 67th edition of the Critérium du Dauphiné cycling stage race. The eight-stage race in France began in Ugine on 7 June and concluded in Modane Valfréjus on 14 June, and was the sixteenth of the twenty-eight races in the 2015 UCI World Tour season. The Dauphiné was viewed as a preview for July's Tour de France and a number of the contenders for the general classification of the Tour participated in the race.

The first leader of the general classification was Team Sky's Peter Kennaugh, who won the opening stage. He lost the race lead to BMC Racing Team rider Rohan Dennis, whose team won stage three's team time trial. His teammate Tejay van Garderen then took over after the race's first mountain stage, stage five. Vincenzo Nibali of the Astana team took the lead after stage six, before van Garderen regained it following stage. Chris Froome (Team Sky), who was second to van Garderen after the penultimate stage, claimed the race victory with his win on the final stage. Van Garderen finished second overall, ten seconds in arrears, with Lampre–Merida's Rui Costa third, a further one minute and six seconds down.

In the race's other classifications, Nacer Bouhanni (Cofidis) won the sprinter's points classification. The mountains classification was won by MTN–Qhubeka's Daniel Teklehaimanot, who achieved it by getting in the early breakaways and placing highly over categorised climbs. Simon Yates of Orica–GreenEDGE won the young rider classification as the best rider born after 1 January 1990. The team classification was won by Movistar Team.

== Teams ==
As the Critérium du Dauphiné was a UCI World Tour event, all seventeen UCI WorldTeams were invited automatically and obligated to send a squad. Four second-tier UCI Professional Continental teams were given wildcard invitations, forming the race's 21-team peloton. The number of riders allowed per squad was eight, therefore the start list contained a total of 168 riders.

The teams entering the race were:

UCI WorldTeams

- AG2R La Mondiale
- Astana
- BMC Racing Team
- Etixx–Quick-Step
- FDJ
- IAM Cycling
- Lampre–Merida
- Lotto–Soudal
- Movistar Team
- Orica–GreenEDGE
- Cannondale–Garmin
- Team Giant–Alpecin
- Team Katusha
- LottoNL–Jumbo
- Team Sky
- Tinkoff–Saxo
- Trek Factory Racing

UCI Professional Continental teams

- Bora–Argon 18
- Cofidis
- Team Europcar
- MTN–Qhubeka

== Pre-race favourites ==
Former winners of the general classification named in the start list were 2008 and 2009 winner Alejandro Valverde (Movistar Team), 2013 winner Chris Froome (Team Sky) and 2014 winner Andrew Talansky (Cannondale–Garmin). The leading contenders for general classification were two of the four Tour de France favourites, Froome and Vincenzo Nibali (Astana). Both winners of the previous two Tours, they were thought to have planned to use the Dauphiné's likeness to Tour's mountainous route as preparation. The riders considered outsiders included Talansky, Valverde, Joaquim Rodríguez (Team Katusha), Tejay van Garderen (BMC Racing Team), Rui Costa (Lampre–Merida), Romain Bardet (AG2R La Mondiale), Bauke Mollema (Trek Factory Racing) and the winner of the young rider classification in 2014, Wilco Kelderman (LottoNL–Jumbo).

== Route ==
On 2 April 2015, the organiser of the race, Amaury Sport Organisation (ASO), announced the route of the 2015 Critérium du Dauphiné at a presentation in Lyon, France. The eight-stage race in the Dauphiné region of France was held from 7–14 June, and was seen as a preview for the Alpine stages in the Tour de France, which took place the following month. The race opened with a 132-kilometre (82.0-mile) hilly circuit stage around Albertville. Stage two crossed the flat Dombes area west from Le Bourget-du-Lac to Villars-les-Dombes and covered a distance of 173 kilometres (107.5 miles). The third stage was a team time trial, the first since the 1980 edition. The 24.5-kilometre (15.2-mile) route from Roanne to Montagny was described by Stephen Farrand of Cyclingnews.com as rolling and could "seriously influence" the general classification. Stage four, the longest at 228 kilometres (141.7 miles), moved the race south to Sisteron and to the Alps. The fifth stage covered the same distance and course as stage seventeen in the Tour de France. It featured the Col d'Allos mountain pass and ended with a summit finish at the Pra-Loup ski resort. Stage six took the race north, with the 183-kilometre (113.7-mile) route from Saint-Bonnet-en-Champsaur to Villard-de-Lans including six climbs. The penultimate stage was another mountainous stage that featured the Col de la Croix Fry and Col des Aravis climbs before a final accent to Saint-Gervais-les-Bains. The final stage took in the Lacets de Montvernier before moving through the Maurienne valley to the finish at Modane Valfréjus.

Stage characteristics and winners
| Stage | Date | Course | Distance | Type | Winner |
|---|---|---|---|---|---|
| 1 | 7 June | Ugine to Albertville | 132 km (82.0 mi) | Hilly stage | Peter Kennaugh (GBR) |
| 2 | 8 June | Le Bourget-du-Lac to Villars-les-Dombes | 173 km (107.5 mi) | Flat stage | Nacer Bouhanni (FRA) |
| 3 | 9 June | Roanne to Montagny | 24.5 km (15.2 mi) | Team time trial | BMC Racing Team |
| 4 | 10 June | Anneyron to Sisteron | 228 km (141.7 mi) | Hilly stage | Nacer Bouhanni (FRA) |
| 5 | 11 June | Digne-les-Bains to Pra-Loup | 161 km (100.0 mi) | Mountain stage | Romain Bardet (FRA) |
| 6 | 12 June | Saint-Bonnet-en-Champsaur to Villard-de-Lans | 183 km (113.7 mi) | Mountain stage | Rui Costa (POR) |
| 7 | 13 June | Montmélian to Saint-Gervais-les-Bains | 155 km (96.3 mi) | Mountain stage | Chris Froome (GBR) |
| 8 | 14 June | Saint-Gervais-les-Bains to Modane Valfréjus | 156.5 km (97.2 mi) | Medium-mountain stage | Chris Froome (GBR) |
| | Total | | 1,213 km (754 mi) | | |

== Stages ==
=== Stage 1 ===
7 June 2015 — Ugine to Albertville, 132 km (82.0 mi)

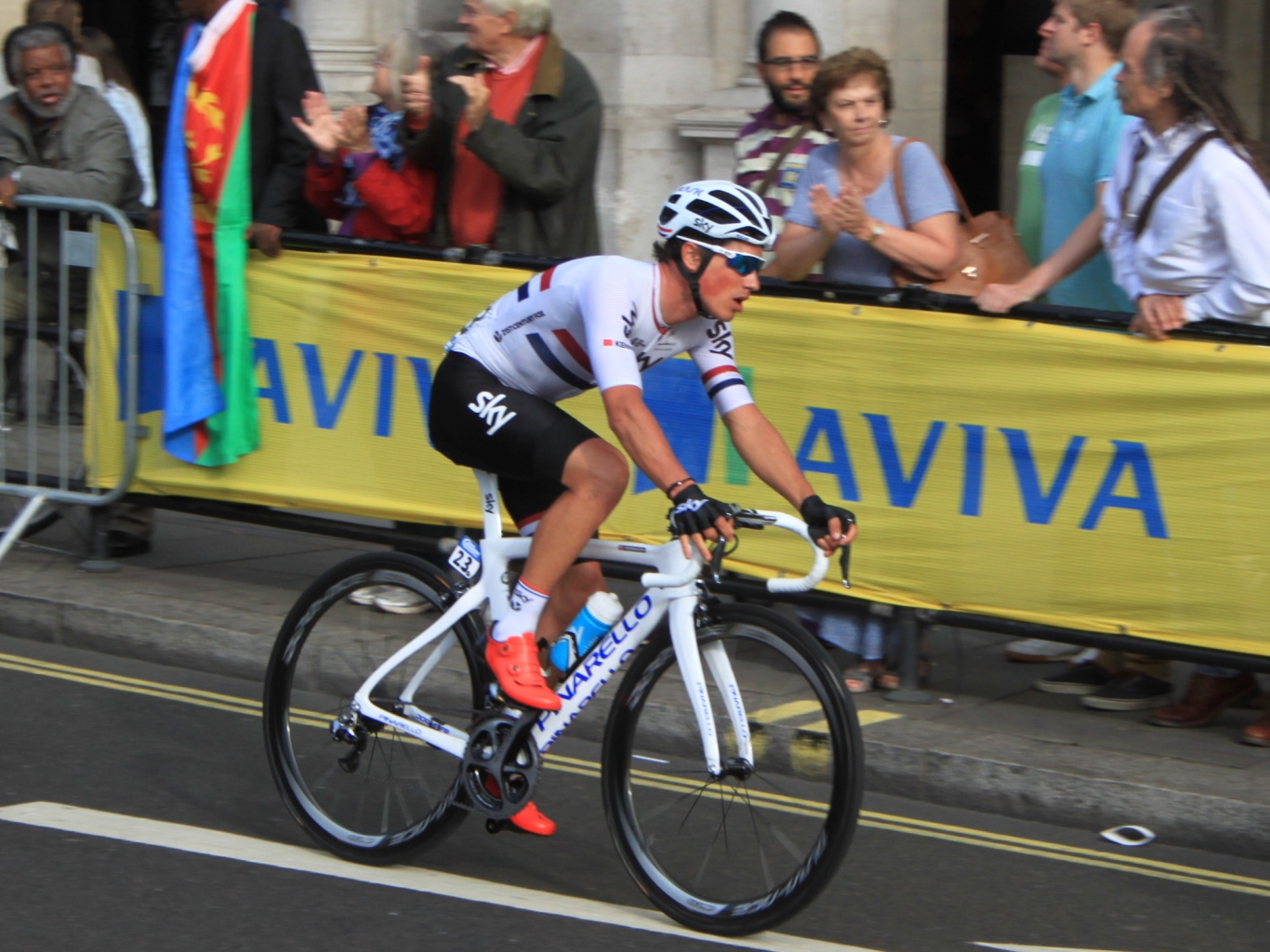
Team Sky's Peter Kennaugh (pictured at the 2015 Tour of Britain), the winner of the opening stage

The race opened with its shortest race stage, at 132 kilometres (82.0 miles). The route left Ugine and passed the finishing city of Albertville, before a loop that featured the category 4 Côte d'Esserts-Blay, 17 kilometres (10.6 miles) in. On the return to Albertville the riders crossed the finish line for the first time for a 19.5-kilometre (12.1-mile) lap. In this lap were two climbs, the third-category Côte du Villard (442 metres (1,450 feet)) and the fourth-category Côte du Cruet, the highest of the stage at 551 metres (1,808 feet). As the race crossed the finish line for the second time, a shorter 15.5-kilometre (9.6-mile) circuit was undertaken five times, with the primary difference being the exclusion of the Côte du Cruet.

In the opening 5 kilometres (3.1 miles), Gert Dockx of Lotto–Soudal was involved in a crash and was forced to abandon the race due to his injuries. After 11 kilometres (6.8 miles), a breakaway was formed by Romain Guillemois (Team Europcar), Björn Thurau (Bora–Argon 18), Daniel Teklehaimanot (MTN–Qhubeka) and Maarten Wynants (LottoNL–Jumbo). Their advantage over the peloton increased to over four minutes at the 33-kilometre (20.5-mile) mark, which moved up to a maximum of around seven minutes twenty seconds. Teklehaimanot accrued enough mountains classification points to secure the polka dot jersey with two climbs of the Côte du Villard to go.

Wijnants and Guillemois were dropped from the quartet on the penultimate ascent of the Villard, with 28 kilometres (17.4 miles) to go. Thurau attacked Teklehaimanot on the last passing of the Villard, which led to an attack by Daniel Oss (BMC Racing Team) from the chasing peloton. With 10 kilometres (6.2 miles) remaining, four more riders joined Oss and the group caught Thurau in the final 5 kilometres (3.1 miles), with the six-rider group holding a margin of twelve seconds. Peter Kennaugh of Team Sky attacked from the group with 2 kilometres (1.2 miles) remaining and took the stage victory two seconds ahead of the bunch sprint. Kennaugh's first place gave him a ten-second time bonus in the general classification; he also took the lead of the points classification and Sky topped the team classification. Tiesj Benoot of Lotto–Soudal became the first leader of the young rider classification.

Stage 1 result
| Rank | Rider | Team | Time |
|---|---|---|---|
| 1 | Peter Kennaugh (GBR) | Team Sky | 3h 06' 51" |
| 2 | Sacha Modolo (ITA) | Lampre–Merida | + 2" |
| 3 | Edvald Boasson Hagen (NOR) | MTN–Qhubeka | + 2" |
| 4 | Tiesj Benoot (BEL) | Lotto–Soudal | + 2" |
| 5 | Simon Gerrans (AUS) | Orica–GreenEDGE | + 2" |
| 6 | Nacer Bouhanni (FRA) | Cofidis | + 2" |
| 7 | Jay McCarthy (AUS) | Tinkoff–Saxo | + 2" |
| 8 | Alejandro Valverde (ESP) | Movistar Team | + 2" |
| 9 | Samuel Dumoulin (FRA) | AG2R La Mondiale | + 2" |
| 10 | Cyril Gautier (FRA) | Team Europcar | + 2" |

General classification after stage 1
| Rank | Rider | Team | Time |
|---|---|---|---|
| 1 | Peter Kennaugh (GBR) | Team Sky | 3h 06' 41" |
| 2 | Sacha Modolo (ITA) | Lampre–Merida | + 6" |
| 3 | Edvald Boasson Hagen (NOR) | MTN–Qhubeka | + 8" |
| 4 | Tiesj Benoot (BEL) | Lotto–Soudal | + 12" |
| 5 | Simon Gerrans (AUS) | Orica–GreenEDGE | + 12" |
| 6 | Nacer Bouhanni (FRA) | Cofidis | + 12" |
| 7 | Jay McCarthy (AUS) | Tinkoff–Saxo | + 12" |
| 8 | Alejandro Valverde (ESP) | Movistar Team | + 12" |
| 9 | Samuel Dumoulin (FRA) | AG2R La Mondiale | + 12" |
| 10 | Cyril Gautier (FRA) | Team Europcar | + 12" |

=== Stage 2 ===
8 June 2015 — Le Bourget-du-Lac to Villars-les-Dombes, 173 km (107.5 mi)

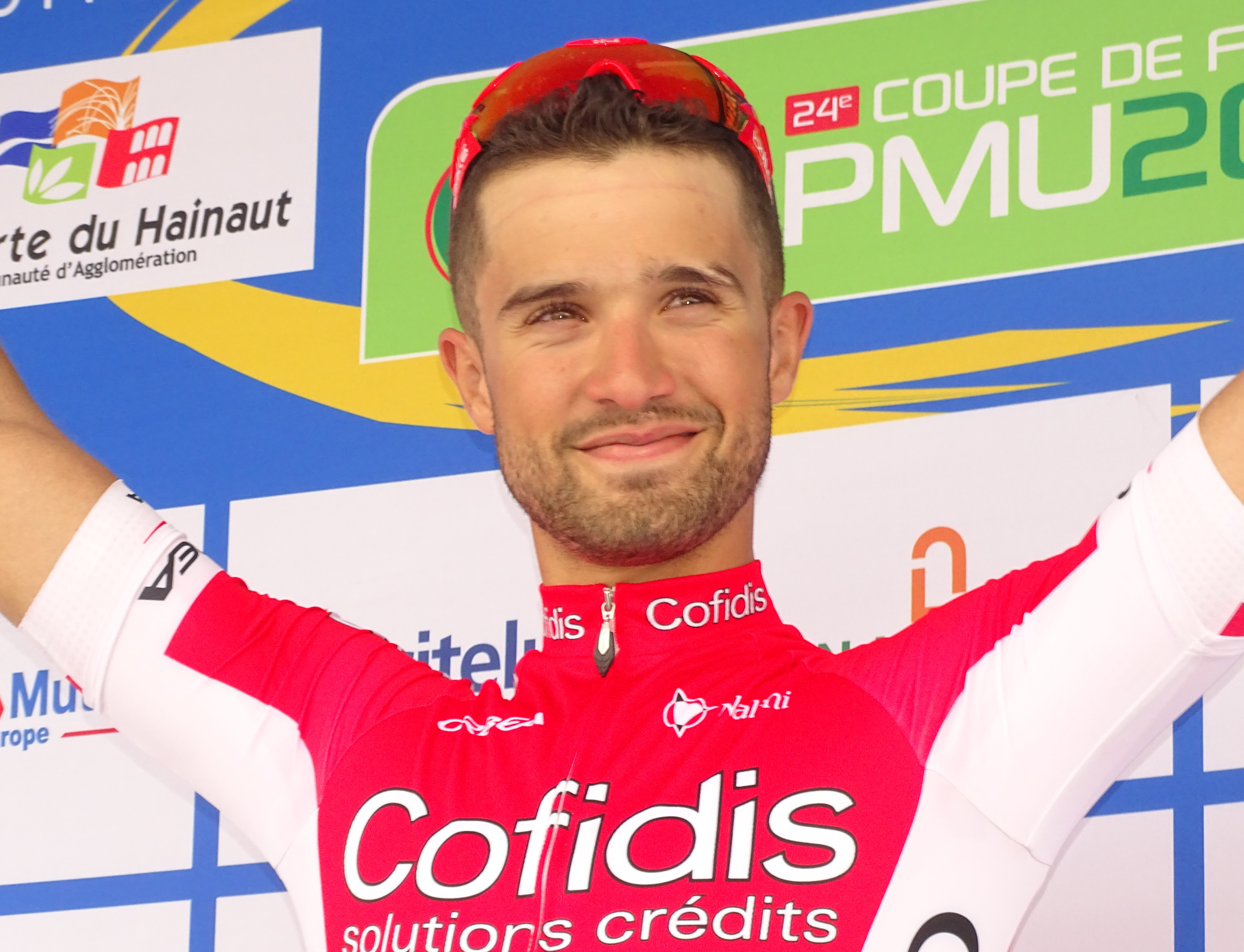
Cofidis rider Nacer Bouhanni (pictured at the 2015 Grand Prix de Denain), the winner of stage two

Stage two's 173-kilometre (107.5-mile) course was the flattest of the race. The stage left the start at Le Bourget-du-Lac and within 3 kilometres (1.9 miles) crossed the second-category Col du Chat. After five smaller climbs, 74 kilometres (46.0 miles) in, the riders then came to the day's highest climb at 1,156 metres (3,793 feet), the first-category Col de Cuvery. The route then followed a 52-kilometre (32.3-mile) descent that included three uncategorised climbs. The final 44 kilometres (27.3 miles) to the finish in Villars-les-Dombes were flat.

The early breakaway was formed by three riders, Perrig Quéméneur (Team Europcar), Arnaud Courteille (FDJ) and, for the second day running, Daniel Teklehaimanot. Teklehaimanot took the maximum points over the Col du Chat. The trio were under seven minutes ahead of the peloton at the foot of the Col de Cuvery. Teklehaimanot again took the points at the top, where the lead had dropped to over a minute.

A crash in the peloton with 21 kilometres (13.0 miles) remaining left a group of riders chasing to the back of the main group, including pre-race favourite Joaquim Rodríguez. The breakaway was caught with 3 kilometres (1.9 miles) remaining. In the final kilometre, the MTN–Qhubeka team controlled the front before leading out their sprinter, Edvald Boasson Hagen. His move was made too early and he was overtaken by three other riders, with Nacer Bouhanni (Cofidis) crossing the finish line first. Third-placed Sacha Modolo (Lampre–Merida) took the lead of the points classification, with Bouhanni becoming the best young rider.

Stage 2 result
| Rank | Rider | Team | Time |
|---|---|---|---|
| 1 | Nacer Bouhanni (FRA) | Cofidis | 4h 23' 46" |
| 2 | Samuel Dumoulin (FRA) | AG2R La Mondiale | + 0" |
| 3 | Sacha Modolo (ITA) | Lampre–Merida | + 0" |
| 4 | Edvald Boasson Hagen (NOR) | MTN–Qhubeka | + 0" |
| 5 | Alexey Tsatevich (RUS) | Team Katusha | + 0" |
| 6 | Jonas van Genechten (BEL) | IAM Cycling | + 0" |
| 7 | Jens Keukeleire (BEL) | Orica–GreenEDGE | + 0" |
| 8 | Ramūnas Navardauskas (LTU) | Cannondale–Garmin | + 0" |
| 9 | Yannick Martinez (FRA) | Team Europcar | + 0" |
| 10 | Luka Mezgec (SLO) | Team Giant–Alpecin | + 0" |

General classification after stage 2
| Rank | Rider | Team | Time |
|---|---|---|---|
| 1 | Peter Kennaugh (GBR) | Team Sky | 7h 30' 27" |
| 2 | Sacha Modolo (ITA) | Lampre–Merida | + 2" |
| 3 | Nacer Bouhanni (FRA) | Cofidis | + 2" |
| 4 | Samuel Dumoulin (FRA) | AG2R La Mondiale | + 6" |
| 5 | Edvald Boasson Hagen (NOR) | MTN–Qhubeka | + 8" |
| 6 | Tiesj Benoot (BEL) | Lotto–Soudal | + 12" |
| 7 | Yannick Martinez (FRA) | Team Europcar | + 12" |
| 8 | Jay McCarthy (AUS) | Tinkoff–Saxo | + 12" |
| 9 | Ramūnas Navardauskas (LTU) | Cannondale–Garmin | + 12" |
| 10 | Julian Alaphilippe (FRA) | Etixx–Quick-Step | + 12" |

=== Stage 3 ===
9 June 2015 — Roanne to Montagny, 24.5 km (15.2 mi), team time trial (TTT)

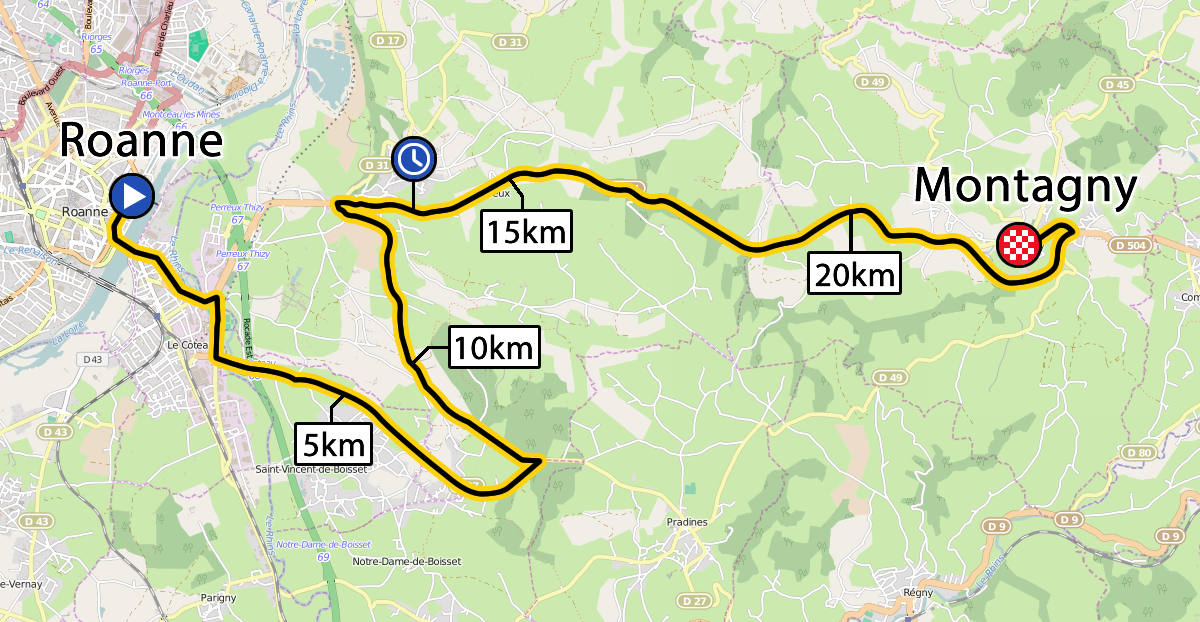
Stage three's 24.5-kilometre (15.2-mile) team time trial was held between Roanne and Montagny in the department of Loire.

The route for the team time trial of stage three from Roanne to Montagny was 24.5 kilometres (15.2 miles) in length. At the 8-kilometre (5.0-mile) mark, a small climb preceded a descent to the intermediate time check at 14 kilometres (8.7 miles). A gradual incline took the stage to its finish.

FDJ were the first team to set a time, with 31' 31". They were soon displaced by the third team to start BMC Racing Team, the team time trial world champions, who set a time of 29' 58". Astana then came in with a four-second deficit to BMC and placed second. Movistar Team were next recording a time of 30' 16", which put them third. Etixx–Quick-Step's time of 30' 21" placed them fourth, with fifth taken by Orica–GreenEDGE, a further five seconds in arrears.

Team Sky, who placed sixth, lost their lead of the team classification to stage winners BMC. Although BMC's highest placed rider in the general classification was Manuel Quinziato, he was not one of the five riders required to finish; the highest of the five was Rohan Dennis, who became the new leader in both the general and young rider classifications. Second placed overall Tejay van Garderen, who was BMC's general classification leader and a pre-race favourite praised his team's effort and was confident about his chances in the race, saying "I feel good. This was the first big test of the Dauphiné, and going into the mountains I feel ready to put up a good challenge." Nacer Bouhanni moved into the lead of the points classification as Sacha Modolo failed to start.

Stage 3 result
| Rank | Team | Time |
|---|---|---|
| 1 | BMC Racing Team | 29' 58" |
| 2 | Astana | + 4" |
| 3 | Movistar Team | + 5" |
| 4 | Etixx–Quick-Step | + 18" |
| 5 | Orica–GreenEDGE | + 23" |
| 6 | Team Sky | + 35" |
| 7 | Cannondale–Garmin | + 43" |
| 8 | Lampre–Merida | + 47" |
| 9 | IAM Cycling | + 50" |
| 10 | LottoNL–Jumbo | + 54" |

General classification after stage 3
| Rank | Rider | Team | Time |
|---|---|---|---|
| 1 | Rohan Dennis (AUS) | BMC Racing Team | 8h 00' 37" |
| 2 | Tejay van Garderen (USA) | BMC Racing Team | + 0" |
| 3 | Andriy Hrivko (UKR) | Astana | + 4" |
| 4 | Vincenzo Nibali (ITA) | Astana | + 4" |
| 5 | Lieuwe Westra (NED) | Astana | + 4" |
| 6 | Rein Taaramäe (EST) | Astana | + 4" |
| 7 | Michele Scarponi (ITA) | Astana | + 4" |
| 8 | Gorka Izagirre (ESP) | Movistar Team | + 5" |
| 9 | Alejandro Valverde (ESP) | Movistar Team | + 5" |
| 10 | John Gadret (FRA) | Movistar Team | + 5" |

=== Stage 4 ===
10 June 2015 — Anneyron to Sisteron, 228 km (141.7 mi)

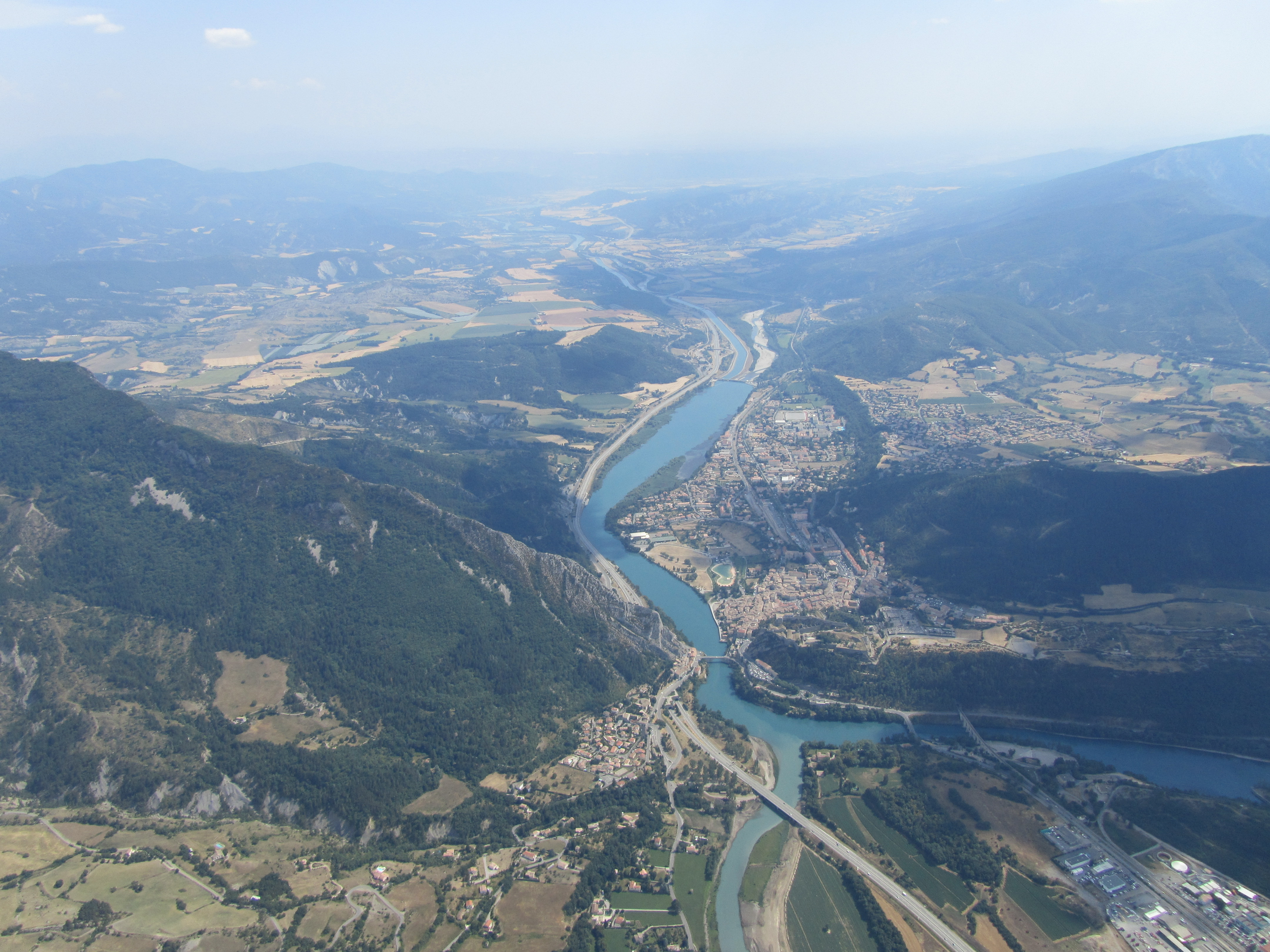
The 228-kilometre (141.7-mile) fourth stage finished in Sisteron at the confluence of the rivers Buëch and Sasse.

The fourth stage was the longest of the race at 228 kilometres (141.7 miles). Starting in Anneyron, the route covered rolling terrain until the passing of the third-category Col de Lescou at 93.5 kilometres (58.1 miles). A short descent led to the foot of the fourth-category Col de Pre-Guittard, the stage's highest point. A similarly sized uncategorised climb followed. The long descent featured a number of small rises before the Côte de la Marquise with 12.5 kilometres (7.8 miles) to go. A series of small climbs then took the stage to the flat finish at Sisteron.

A breakaway duo consisting of Martijn Keizer (LottoNL–Jumbo) and Tosh Van der Sande (Lotto–Soudal) escaped 3 kilometres (1.9 miles) into the stage. Their lead was six minutes and thirty seconds after they had passed the Lescou and Pre-Guittard climbs. At the foot of the Côte de la Marquise, the pair had a one-minute advantage. Van der Sande was dropped on the climb and Keizer led over the summit with margin of twenty seconds. Attacks from the peloton on the descent saw the formation of a group consisting of Cyril Gautier (Team Europcar), Tim Wellens (Lotto–Soudal), Lawson Craddock (Team Giant–Alpecin) and Wilco Kelderman. Wellens attacked and then passed Keizer.

Wellens was caught by the peloton in the final 2 kilometres (1.2 miles), before a failed move by a trio consisting of Daniel Oss, Tony Martin (Etixx–Quick-Step) and Bram Tankink (LottoNL–Jumbo). Tony Gallopin (Lotto–Soudal) launched a late attack, but was caught during the bunch sprint that was won by Nacer Bouhanni, his second stage victory of the race. There were no changes to the classifications.

Stage 4 result
| Rank | Rider | Team | Time |
|---|---|---|---|
| 1 | Nacer Bouhanni (FRA) | Cofidis | 5h 30' 53" |
| 2 | Jonas van Genechten (BEL) | IAM Cycling | + 0" |
| 3 | Luka Mezgec (SLO) | Team Giant–Alpecin | + 0" |
| 4 | Edvald Boasson Hagen (NOR) | MTN–Qhubeka | + 0" |
| 5 | Alexey Tsatevich (RUS) | Team Katusha | + 0" |
| 6 | Julian Alaphilippe (FRA) | Etixx–Quick-Step | + 0" |
| 7 | Samuel Dumoulin (FRA) | AG2R La Mondiale | + 0" |
| 8 | Tiesj Benoot (BEL) | Lotto–Soudal | + 0" |
| 9 | Kévin Reza (FRA) | FDJ | + 0" |
| 10 | Nathan Haas (AUS) | Cannondale–Garmin | + 0" |

General classification after stage 4
| Rank | Rider | Team | Time |
|---|---|---|---|
| 1 | Rohan Dennis (AUS) | BMC Racing Team | 13h 31' 30" |
| 2 | Tejay van Garderen (USA) | BMC Racing Team | + 0" |
| 3 | Andriy Hrivko (UKR) | Astana | + 4" |
| 4 | Vincenzo Nibali (ITA) | Astana | + 4" |
| 5 | Lieuwe Westra (NED) | Astana | + 4" |
| 6 | Michele Scarponi (ITA) | Astana | + 4" |
| 7 | Rein Taaramäe (EST) | Astana | + 4" |
| 8 | Gorka Izagirre (ESP) | Movistar Team | + 5" |
| 9 | Alejandro Valverde (ESP) | Movistar Team | + 5" |
| 10 | John Gadret (FRA) | Movistar Team | + 5" |

=== Stage 5 ===
11 June 2015 — Digne-les-Bains to Pra-Loup, 161 km (100.0 mi)

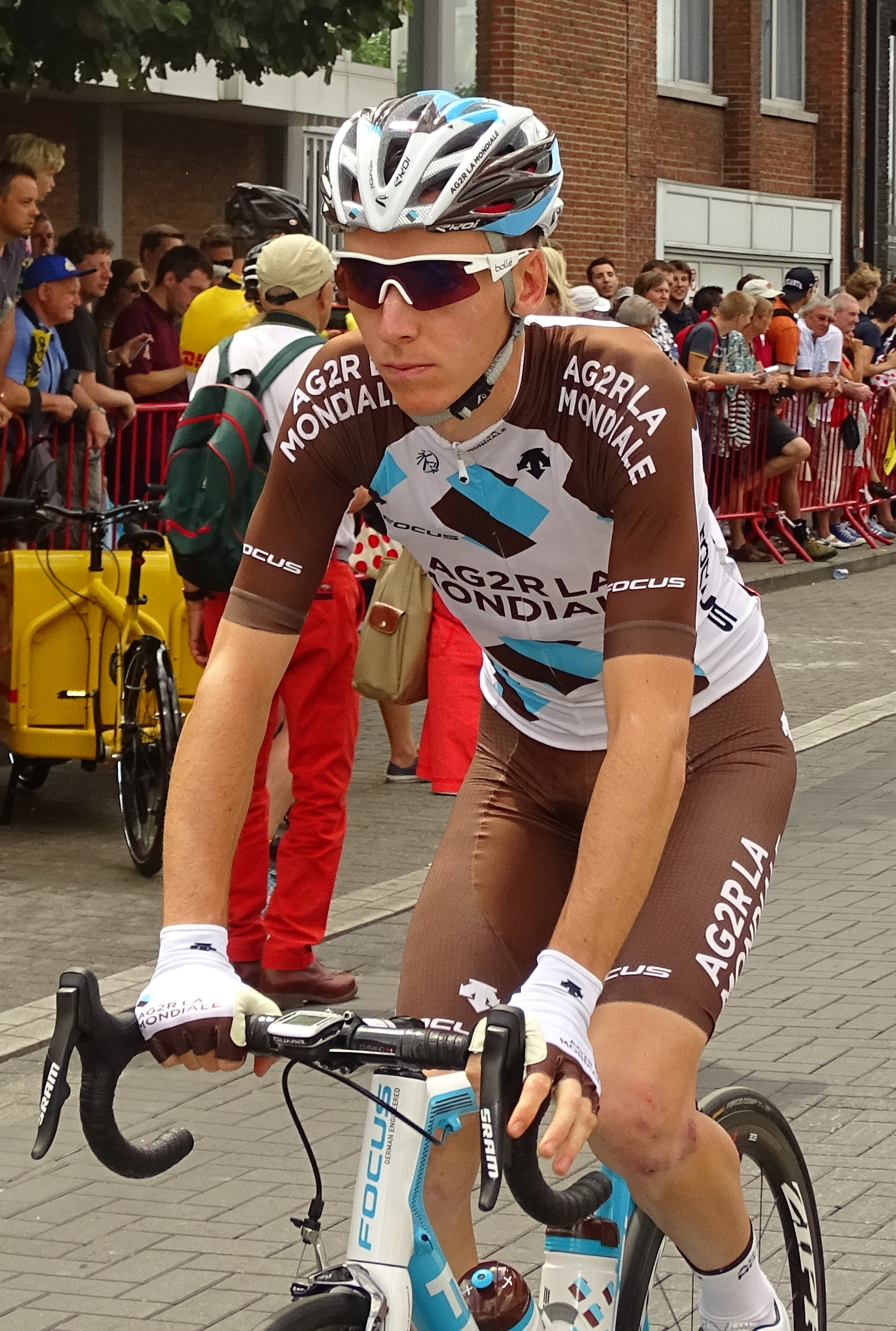
AG2R La Mondiale's Romain Bardet (pictured at the 2015 Tour de France), the winner of the fifth stage

Stage five from Digne-les-Bains to Pra-Loup was the first classified as mountainous and was 161 kilometres (100.0 miles) in length. The first section of the stage was flat, until the passing of the third-category Col des Léques at 40 kilometres (24.9 miles). After a descent and small rise a came another third-category climb, the Col de Toutes Aures. The route then dropped down before a further rising up to the second-category Col de la Colle-Saint-Michel which topped at 96 kilometres (59.7 miles) in. The descent was followed by the first-category Col d'Allos at 139 kilometres (86.4 miles). The resulting descent, which began with 22 kilometres (13.7 miles) to go, was long and technical. The final climb to the finish at Pra-Loup was 6.2 kilometres (3.9 miles) long and had an average gradient of 6.5%.

Mountains classification leader Daniel Teklehaimanot was the first to initiate the early seven-rider breakaway; the other riders were Christophe Riblon (AG2R La Mondiale), Tim Wellens, Pieter Serry (Etixx–Quick-Step), Romain Sicard (Team Europcar), Arnaud Courteille, and Albert Timmer (both Team Giant–Alpecin). Courteille claimed the points at the Col des Lèques, with Teklehaimanot second, with the aforementioned first over the Col de Toutes Aures and Col de la Colle-Saint-Michel. Team Sky set a high pace at the head of the peloton throughout the Col d'Allos, leading to a large number of riders being dropped, including the race leader Rohan Dennis. In the breakaway, an attack by Serry dropped Riblon, Teklehaimanot, and Courteille. Before the summit of the climb, with 24 kilometres (14.9 miles) remaining, the break was caught.

As the race reached the summit, Romain Bardet attacked, and the bottom had gained a twenty-second advantage over the front group of around thirty riders, increasing it to one minute at the foot of the Pra-Loup climb. Sky again controlled the head of the chase, with Vincenzo Nibali, Alejandro Valverde and Wilco Kelderman the notable riders distanced. Chris Froome launched an attack in the final 2 kilometres (1.2 miles), with Tejay van Garderen and Beñat Intxausti following. Van Garderen dropped Intxausti and passed Froome to take second place, thirty-six seconds behind stage winner Bardet. The new leaders in the classifications were van Garderen in the general, Bardet in the young riders' and Sky in the team standings.

Stage 5 result
| Rank | Rider | Team | Time |
|---|---|---|---|
| 1 | Romain Bardet (FRA) | AG2R La Mondiale | 4h 31' 22" |
| 2 | Tejay van Garderen (USA) | BMC Racing Team | + 36" |
| 3 | Chris Froome (GBR) | Team Sky | + 40" |
| 4 | Beñat Intxausti (ESP) | Movistar Team | + 42" |
| 5 | Simon Yates (GBR) | Orica–GreenEDGE | + 50" |
| 6 | Louis Meintjes (RSA) | MTN–Qhubeka | + 50" |
| 7 | Andrew Talansky (USA) | Cannondale–Garmin | + 55" |
| 8 | Michele Scarponi (ITA) | Astana | + 57" |
| 9 | Pierre Rolland (FRA) | Team Europcar | + 57" |
| 10 | Mathias Frank (SUI) | IAM Cycling | + 57" |

General classification after stage 5
| Rank | Rider | Team | Time |
|---|---|---|---|
| 1 | Tejay van Garderen (USA) | BMC Racing Team | 18h 03' 22" |
| 2 | Beñat Intxausti (ESP) | Movistar Team | + 17" |
| 3 | Romain Bardet (FRA) | AG2R La Mondiale | + 20" |
| 4 | Michele Scarponi (ITA) | Astana | + 31" |
| 5 | Chris Froome (GBR) | Team Sky | + 41" |
| 6 | Simon Yates (GBR) | Orica–GreenEDGE | + 43" |
| 7 | Andrew Talansky (USA) | Cannondale–Garmin | + 1' 08" |
| 8 | Dan Martin (IRL) | Cannondale–Garmin | + 1' 16" |
| 9 | Mathias Frank (SUI) | IAM Cycling | + 1' 17" |
| 10 | Nicolas Roche (IRL) | Team Sky | + 1' 25" |

=== Stage 6 ===
12 June 2015 — Saint-Bonnet-en-Champsaur to Villard-de-Lans, 183 km (113.7 mi)

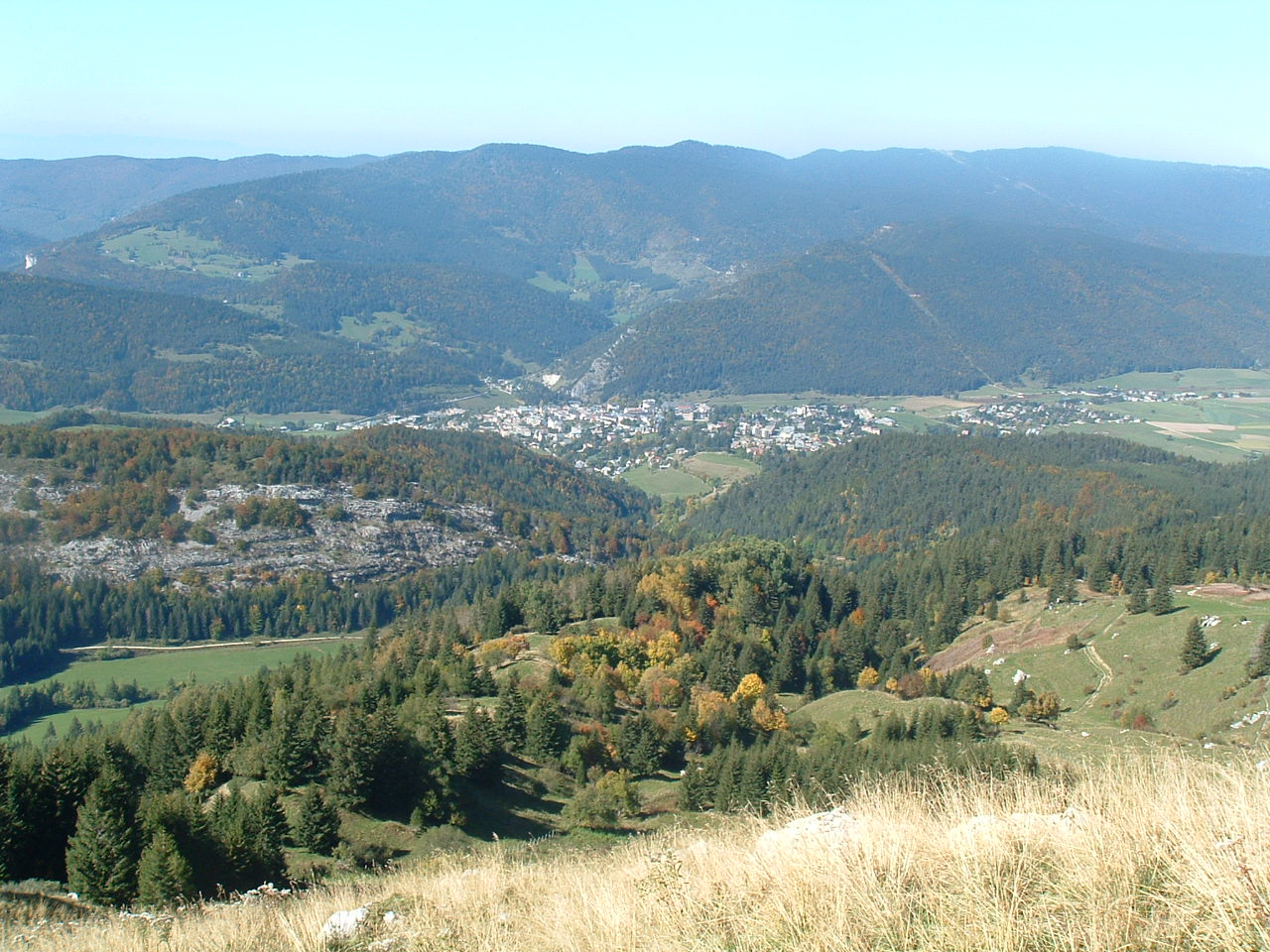
The mountainous town of Villard-de-Lans hosted the finish of the 183-kilometre (113.7-mile) sixth stage.

The sixth stage from Saint-Bonnet-en-Champsaur to Villard-de-Lans moved the race into the high mountains with six categorised climbs. It was the second longest stage at 183 kilometres (113.7 miles). The opening third of the route crossed hilly terrain that featured two third-category climbs, the Rampe du Motty and the Côte du Barrage de Sautet. The riders traversed the second-category Col de la Croix Haute at the 67.5-kilometre (41.9-mile) mark, before a short descent and a further rise to the third-category Col de Grimone. After a long descent and short rise, the race came to the foot of the first-category Col du Rousset. At the summit with 51 kilometres (31.7 miles) remaining, the day's highest point (1,254 metres (4,114 feet)), the riders dropped down to the final hills before the summit finish at the third-category climb to Villard-de-Lans.

Early in the wet stage, a group of nine riders broke away, only to be pulled back the peloton, with a second group of nineteen also failing. An unsuccessful move from Tony Martin was followed by an attack by Vincenzo Nibali over the Col de Grimone and the formation of an elite five-strong group on descent with Rui Costa, Alejandro Valverde, and Tony Gallopin. This attack reduced the main group of chasers and caused the abandonment of several riders. The advantage of the break was over three minutes as they climbed the Col de Rousset, with Nibali briefly escaping on the subsequent descent.

Martin was dropped with 22 kilometres (13.7 miles) remaining, with the advantage at over two minutes. In the chasing main group, Simon Yates (Orica–GreenEDGE) and Dan Martin (Cannondale–Garmin) moved clear. Gallopin launched an attack from the breakaway with 4.5 kilometres (2.8 miles) to go, with Nibali following at 1.5 kilometres (0.9 miles). Costa was able to pull both back ahead and passed them to take the stage win. Nibali took over the lead of the general classification, with a margin of twenty-nine seconds over Costa. Movistar Team moved into the lead of the team classification.

Stage 6 result
| Rank | Rider | Team | Time |
|---|---|---|---|
| 1 | Rui Costa (POR) | Lampre–Merida | 4h 29' 23" |
| 2 | Vincenzo Nibali (ITA) | Astana | + 5" |
| 3 | Alejandro Valverde (ESP) | Movistar Team | + 38" |
| 4 | Tony Gallopin (FRA) | Lotto–Soudal | + 39" |
| 5 | Simon Yates (GBR) | Orica–GreenEDGE | + 1' 24" |
| 6 | Dan Martin (IRL) | Cannondale–Garmin | + 1' 46" |
| 7 | John Gadret (FRA) | Movistar Team | + 1' 48" |
| 8 | Tiesj Benoot (BEL) | Lotto–Soudal | + 1' 59" |
| 9 | Chris Froome (GBR) | Team Sky | + 2' 12" |
| 10 | Beñat Intxausti (SPA) | Movistar Team | + 2' 12" |

General classification after stage 6
| Rank | Rider | Team | Time |
|---|---|---|---|
| 1 | Vincenzo Nibali (ITA) | Astana | 22h 34' 17" |
| 2 | Rui Costa (POR) | Lampre–Merida | + 29" |
| 3 | Alejandro Valverde (ESP) | Movistar Team | + 30" |
| 4 | Simon Yates (GBR) | Orica–GreenEDGE | + 35" |
| 5 | Tejay van Garderen (USA) | BMC Racing Team | + 42" |
| 6 | Beñat Intxausti (ESP) | Movistar Team | + 57" |
| 7 | Chris Froome (GBR) | Team Sky | + 1' 21" |
| 8 | Tony Gallopin (FRA) | Lotto–Soudal | + 1' 29" |
| 9 | Romain Bardet (FRA) | AG2R La Mondiale | + 1' 30" |
| 10 | Dan Martin (IRL) | Cannondale–Garmin | + 1' 30" |

=== Stage 7 ===
13 June 2015 — Montmélian to Saint-Gervais-les-Bains, 155 km (96.3 mi)

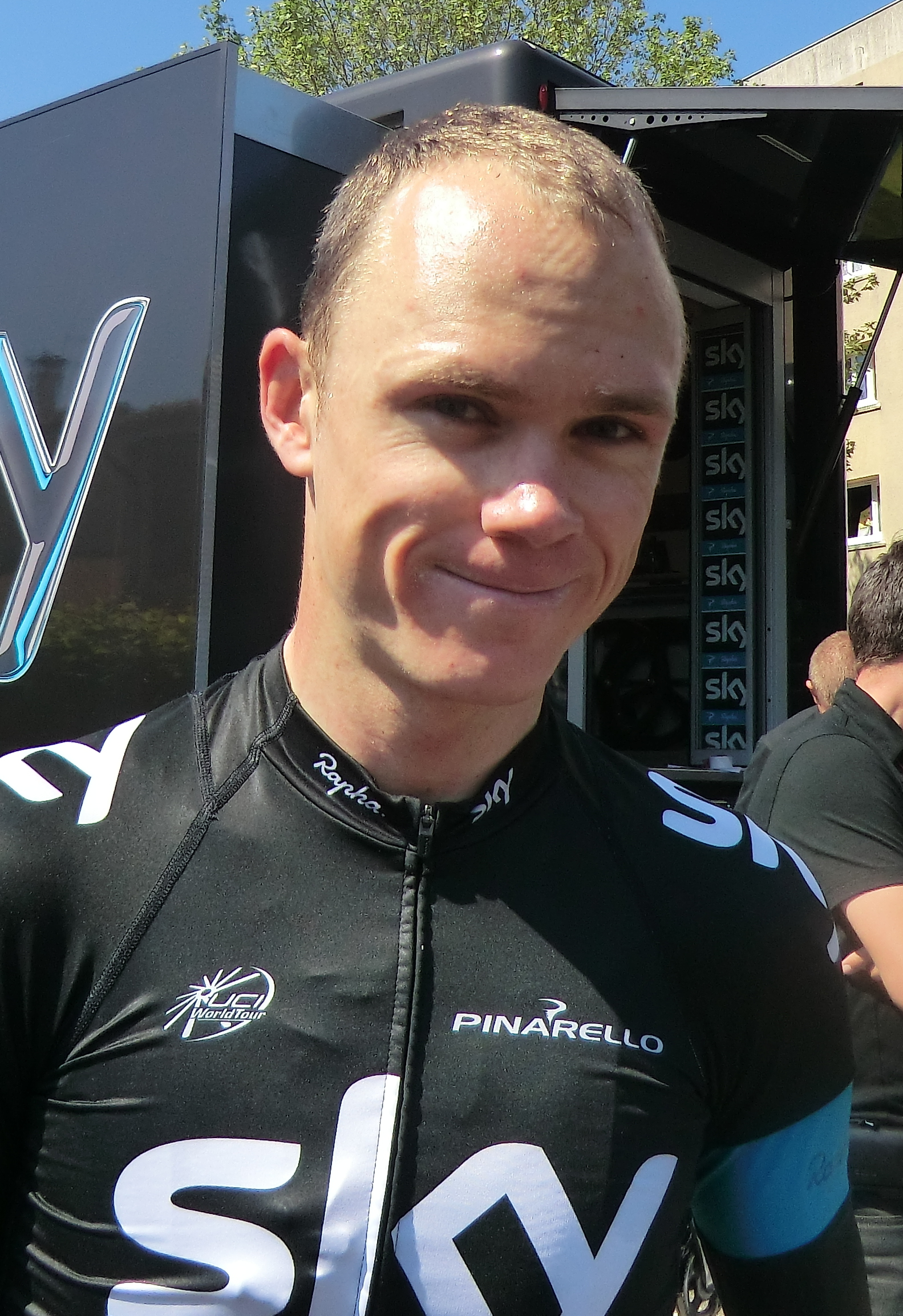
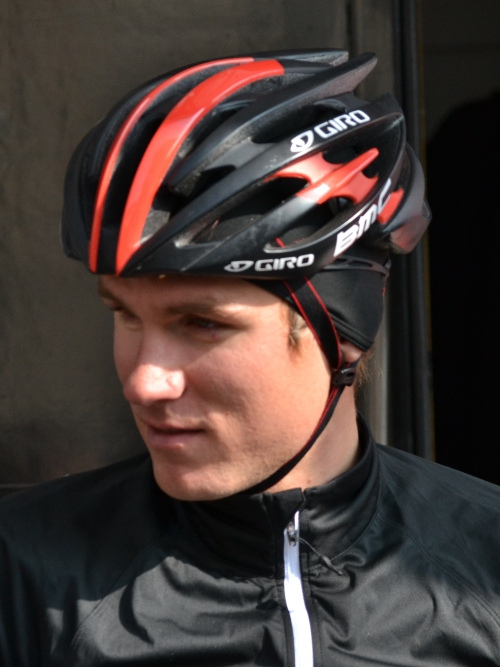
Chris Froome and Tejay van Garderen (both pictured in 2013) finished the stage in first and second place respectively, with the order reversed for the resulting general classification.

Stage seven was the queen stage of the race, with five first-category climbs and the third-category Col des Aravis. It was the shortest in length of the three mountain stages. The initial 27.5 kilometres (17.1 miles) were flat apart from one small climb. The riders then began the climb of the Col de Tamié, which was followed by the ascent of Col de la Forclaz. After a descent and a number of small hills, the Col de la Croix Fry was climbed. At the top a small drop and climb over the Col des Aravis took the riders to a descent and a long gradual incline. A further descent and flat section placed the race at the foot of the Côte des Amerand. After a small drop the stage concluded with the climb to Saint-Gervais-les-Bains.

Another wet stage saw a breakaway of thirty-five riders move away 15 kilometres (9.3 miles) in, which decreased to twenty-five on the Col de la Croix Fry. On the aforemetenioed climb, Team Sky reduced the size of the peloton and the advantage of the breakaway. Daniel Teklehaimanot took maximum points over the opening four climbs to secure the mountains classification. The Col des Aravis split the breakaway, and on the descent, an attack out of the eighteen-strong leading group by Daniel Navarro (Cofidis) and Riccardo Zoidl (Trek Factory Racing) gained a lead of three minutes. The peloton fractured on the Côte des Amerands, with race leader Vincenzo Nibali being dropped.

At the start of the final climb, the leading duo were joined by Jonathan Castroviejo (Movistar Team) and Bartosz Huzarski (Bora–Argon 18). Sky set a high pace in pursuit of the leading group, and with 4 kilometres (2.5 miles) to go, Chris Froome attacked, followed by Tejay van Garderen, and they soon passed the leaders. With 1.5 kilometres (0.9 miles) remaining, Froome attacked to win the stage by a margin of seventeen seconds. Van Garderen moved into the lead of the general classification, and although placing second in the stage, he was content, saying "My tactic was just to mark Froome and when he went there was no way I could follow him, but I'm very happy with the yellow jersey."

Stage 7 result
| Rank | Rider | Team | Time |
|---|---|---|---|
| 1 | Chris Froome (GBR) | Team Sky | 4h 24' 17" |
| 2 | Tejay van Garderen (USA) | BMC Racing Team | + 17" |
| 3 | Louis Meintjes (RSA) | MTN–Qhubeka | + 41" |
| 4 | Beñat Intxausti (ESP) | Movistar Team | + 41" |
| 5 | Joaquim Rodríguez (ESP) | Team Katusha | + 54" |
| 6 | Romain Bardet (FRA) | AG2R La Mondiale | + 1' 08" |
| 7 | Alexis Vuillermoz (FRA) | AG2R La Mondiale | + 1' 15" |
| 8 | Andrew Talansky (USA) | Cannondale–Garmin | + 1' 25" |
| 9 | Rui Costa (POR) | Lampre–Merida | + 1' 34" |
| 10 | Daniel Navarro (ESP) | Movistar Team | + 1' 45" |

General classification after stage 7
| Rank | Rider | Team | Time |
|---|---|---|---|
| 1 | Tejay van Garderen (USA) | BMC Racing Team | 26h 59' 27" |
| 2 | Chris Froome (GBR) | Team Sky | + 18" |
| 3 | Beñat Intxausti (ESP) | Movistar Team | + 45" |
| 4 | Rui Costa (POR) | Lampre–Merida | + 1' 10" |
| 5 | Simon Yates (GBR) | Orica–GreenEDGE | + 1' 29" |
| 6 | Alejandro Valverde (ESP) | Movistar Team | + 1' 40" |
| 7 | Romain Bardet (FRA) | AG2R La Mondiale | + 1' 45" |
| 8 | Dan Martin (IRL) | Cannondale–Garmin | + 2' 29" |
| 9 | Andrew Talansky (USA) | Cannondale–Garmin | + 2' 39" |
| 10 | Joaquim Rodríguez (ESP) | Team Katusha | + 2' 46" |

=== Stage 8 ===
14 June 2015 — Saint-Gervais-les-Bains to Modane Valfréjus, 156.5 km (97.2 mi)

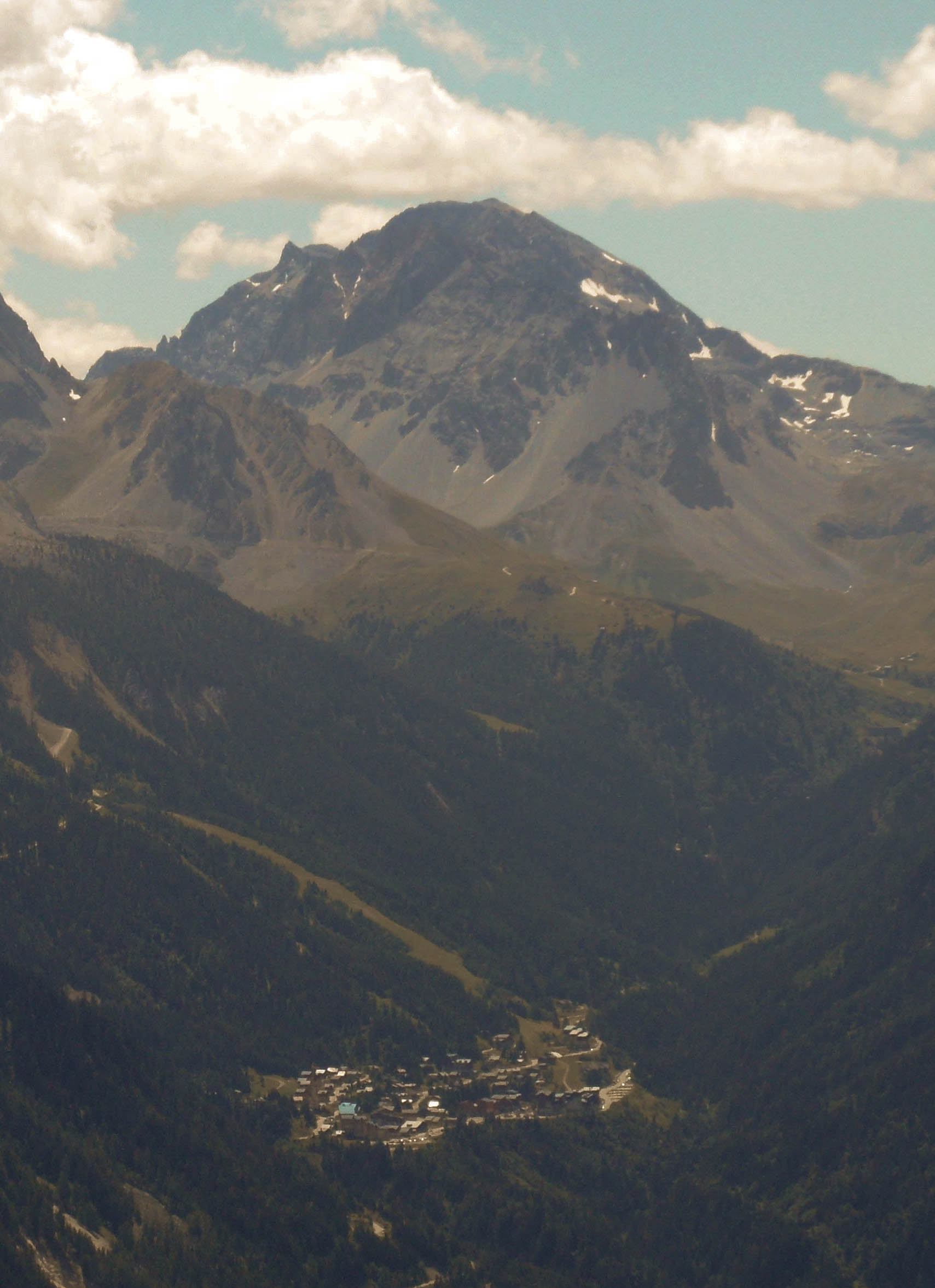
The Valfréjus ski resort in the Massif des Cerces hosted the finish of the final stage.

The final stage of the race left from the location of the previous stage's finish, Saint-Gervais-les-Bains, for a 156.5-kilometre (97.2-mile) route. After the riders climbed a 7.5-kilometre (4.7-mile) rise from the start, they went down a long descent with the second-category Côte d'Héry-sur-Ugine in the middle. The terrain remained flat until the fourth-category Côte d'Aiton, 65.5 kilometres (40.7 miles) in. This was followed by the third-category Côte de Saint-Georges-d'Hurtières. A further flat section placed the riders at the foot of the first-category Lacets de Montvernier. After the subsequent descent began a long gradual incline to the climb of the third-category Côte de Saint-André. A small descent took the race to Modane and the ascent to the summit finish at the Valfréjus ski resort; the length of the climb was 8.4 kilometres (5.2 miles) with an average gradient of 5.7%.

Wilco Kelderman's move in the opening 10 kilometres (6.2 miles) initiated a breakaway of thirteen riders. Tony Martin attacked from the break on the Côte de Saint-Georges-d'Hurtières and at the foot of the Lacets de Montvernier he had an advantage of one-and-a-half minutes over them and around four over the peloton. The last of the riders from the break caught Martin on the Côte de Saint-André, where Steve Cummings of MTN–Qhubeka attacked this front group.

Cummings' lead over the peloton at the foot of the final climb was one minute and twenty seconds. With 5.5 kilometres (3.4 miles) remaining, Vincenzo Nibali moved to the front in support of Astana teammate Michele Scarponi, whose failed attack led to the formation of an elite group of chasers including the general classification leaders. Chris Froome was the only rider to have the support of a teammate, Wout Poels, who rode on the front until Froome attacked as they caught Cummings. At first Tejay van Garderen could follow this move, but he was eventually unable to keep up with Froome and was caught by Simon Yates and Rui Costa. Froome took the stage victory, eighteen seconds ahead of the three behind, and finished the race as the winner of the general classification.

Stage 8 result
| Rank | Rider | Team | Time |
|---|---|---|---|
| 1 | Chris Froome (GBR) | Team Sky | 3h 59' 27" |
| 2 | Simon Yates (GBR) | Orica–GreenEDGE | + 18" |
| 3 | Rui Costa (POR) | Lampre–Merida | + 18" |
| 4 | Tejay van Garderen (USA) | BMC Racing Team | + 18" |
| 5 | Joaquim Rodríguez (ESP) | Team Katusha | + 28" |
| 6 | Romain Bardet (FRA) | AG2R La Mondiale | + 28" |
| 7 | Dan Martin (IRL) | Cannondale–Garmin | + 31" |
| 8 | Wout Poels (NED) | Team Sky | + 44" |
| 9 | Pierre Rolland (FRA) | Team Europcar | + 44" |
| 10 | Beñat Intxausti (ESP) | Movistar Team | + 44" |

Final general classification
| Rank | Rider | Team | Time |
|---|---|---|---|
| 1 | Chris Froome (GBR) | Team Sky | 30h 59' 02" |
| 2 | Tejay van Garderen (USA) | BMC Racing Team | + 10" |
| 3 | Rui Costa (POR) | Lampre–Merida | + 1' 16" |
| 4 | Beñat Intxausti (ESP) | Movistar Team | + 1' 21" |
| 5 | Simon Yates (GBR) | Orica–GreenEDGE | + 1' 33" |
| 6 | Romain Bardet (FRA) | AG2R La Mondiale | + 2' 05" |
| 7 | Dan Martin (IRL) | Cannondale–Garmin | + 2' 52" |
| 8 | Joaquim Rodríguez (ESP) | Team Katusha | + 3' 06" |
| 9 | Alejandro Valverde (ESP) | Movistar Team | + 3' 12" |
| 10 | Andrew Talansky (USA) | Cannondale–Garmin | + 4' 17" |

== Classification leadership ==
Mountains classification points
| Category | 1st | 2nd | 3rd | 4th | 5th | 6th |
|---|---|---|---|---|---|---|
| First | 10 | 8 | 6 | 4 | 2 | 1 |
| Second | 5 | 3 | 2 | 1 | | |
| Third | 2 | 1 | | | | |
| Fourth | 1 | | | | | |

In the Critérium du Dauphiné, four different jerseys were awarded. The most important was the general classification, which was calculated by adding each rider's finishing times on each stage. The rider with the least accumulated time is the race leader, identified by a yellow jersey with a blue bar; the winner of this classification was considered the winner of the race.

Additionally, there was a points classification, which awarded a green jersey. In the classification, cyclists received points for finishing in the top 10 in a stage. For stages, 1, 2 and 4 the win earned 25 points, second place 22, third 20, fourth 18, fifth 16, sixth 14, seventh 12, eighth 10, ninth 8 and tenth 6. For stages 5, 6, 7 and 8 the win earned 15 points, second place 12, third 10, fourth 8, fifth 6, and 1 point fewer per place down to a single point for 10th. Points towards the classification could also be achieved at each of the intermediate sprints; these points were given to the top three riders through the line with 5 points for first, 3 for second, and 1 point for third.

There was also a mountains classification, the leadership of which was marked by a red jersey with white polka dots. In the mountains classification, points towards the classification were won by reaching the top of a climb before other cyclists. Each climb was categorised as either first, second, third, or fourth-category, with more points available for the higher-categorised climbs. First-category climbs awarded the most points; the first six riders were able to accrue points, compared with the first four on second-category climbs, the first two on third-category and only the first for fourth-category.

The fourth jersey represented the young rider classification, marked by a white jersey. This was decided the same way as the general classification, but only riders born on or after 1 January 1990 were eligible to be ranked in the classification. There was also a team classification, in which the times of the best three cyclists per team on each stage were added together; the leading team at the end of the race was the team with the lowest total time.

Classification leadership by stage
| Stage | Winner | General classification | Points classification | Mountains classification | Young rider classification | Team classification |
|---|---|---|---|---|---|---|
| 1 | Peter Kennaugh | Peter Kennaugh | Peter Kennaugh | Daniel Teklehaimanot | Tiesj Benoot | Team Sky |
| 2 | Nacer Bouhanni | Peter Kennaugh | Sacha Modolo | Daniel Teklehaimanot | Nacer Bouhanni | Team Sky |
| 3 | BMC Racing Team | Rohan Dennis | Nacer Bouhanni | Daniel Teklehaimanot | Rohan Dennis | BMC Racing Team |
| 4 | Nacer Bouhanni | Rohan Dennis | Nacer Bouhanni | Daniel Teklehaimanot | Rohan Dennis | BMC Racing Team |
| 5 | Romain Bardet | Tejay van Garderen | Nacer Bouhanni | Daniel Teklehaimanot | Romain Bardet | Team Sky |
| 6 | Rui Costa | Vincenzo Nibali | Nacer Bouhanni | Daniel Teklehaimanot | Simon Yates | Movistar Team |
| 7 | Chris Froome | Tejay van Garderen | Nacer Bouhanni | Daniel Teklehaimanot | Simon Yates | Movistar Team |
| 8 | Chris Froome | Chris Froome | Nacer Bouhanni | Daniel Teklehaimanot | Simon Yates | Movistar Team |
| Final | | Chris Froome | Nacer Bouhanni | Daniel Teklehaimanot | Simon Yates | Movistar Team |

== Final standings ==
Legend
| A yellow jersey with a blue band. | Denotes the leader of the general classification | A green jersey. | Denotes the leader of the points classification |
| A white jersey with red polka dots. | Denotes the leader of the mountains classification | A white jersey. | Denotes the leader of the young rider classification |
| A white jersey with a yellow number bib. | Denotes the leader of the team classification | | |

=== General classification ===
Final general classification (1–10)
| Rank | Rider | Team | Time |
|---|---|---|---|
| 1 | Chris Froome (GBR) | Team Sky | 30h 59' 02" |
| 2 | Tejay van Garderen (USA) | BMC Racing Team | + 10" |
| 3 | Rui Costa (POR) | Lampre–Merida | + 1' 16" |
| 4 | Beñat Intxausti (ESP) | Movistar Team | + 1' 21" |
| 5 | Simon Yates (GBR) | Orica–GreenEDGE | + 1' 33" |
| 6 | Romain Bardet (FRA) | AG2R La Mondiale | + 2' 05" |
| 7 | Dan Martin (IRL) | Cannondale–Garmin | + 2' 52" |
| 8 | Joaquim Rodríguez (ESP) | Team Katusha | + 3' 06" |
| 9 | Alejandro Valverde (ESP) | Movistar Team | + 3' 12" |
| 10 | Andrew Talansky (USA) | Cannondale–Garmin | + 4' 17" |

=== Points classification ===
Final points classification (1–10)
| Rank | Rider | Team | Points |
|---|---|---|---|
| 1 | Nacer Bouhanni (FRA) | Cofidis | 64 |
| 2 | Edvald Boasson Hagen (NOR) | MTN–Qhubeka | 56 |
| 3 | Chris Froome (GBR) | Team Sky | 42 |
| 4 | Tejay van Garderen (USA) | BMC Racing Team | 32 |
| 5 | Alexey Tsatevich (RUS) | Team Katusha | 32 |
| 6 | Tiesj Benoot (BEL) | Lotto–Soudal | 31 |
| 7 | Rui Costa (POR) | Lampre–Merida | 27 |
| 8 | Romain Bardet (FRA) | AG2R La Mondiale | 25 |
| 9 | Peter Kennaugh (GBR) | Team Sky | 25 |
| 10 | Simon Yates (GBR) | Orica–GreenEDGE | 24 |

=== Mountains classification ===
Final mountains classification (1–10)
| Rank | Rider | Team | Points |
|---|---|---|---|
| 1 | Daniel Teklehaimanot (ERI) | MTN–Qhubeka | 65 |
| 2 | Chris Froome (GBR) | Team Sky | 26 |
| 3 | Louis Meintjes (RSA) | MTN–Qhubeka | 25 |
| 4 | Romain Bardet (FRA) | AG2R La Mondiale | 17 |
| 5 | Vincenzo Nibali (ITA) | Astana | 17 |
| 6 | Perrig Quéméneur (FRA) | Team Europcar | 16 |
| 7 | Tejay van Garderen (USA) | BMC Racing Team | 15 |
| 8 | Rui Costa (POR) | Lampre–Merida | 14 |
| 9 | Arnaud Courteille (FRA) | FDJ | 14 |
| 10 | Daniel Navarro (ESP) | Cofidis | 14 |

=== Young rider classification ===
Final young rider classification (1–10)
| Rank | Rider | Team | Time |
|---|---|---|---|
| 1 | Simon Yates (GBR) | Orica–GreenEDGE | 31h 00' 35" |
| 2 | Romain Bardet (FRA) | AG2R La Mondiale | + 32" |
| 3 | Adam Yates (GBR) | Orica–GreenEDGE | + 23' 57" |
| 4 | Wilco Kelderman (NED) | LottoNL–Jumbo | + 27' 07" |
| 5 | Tiesj Benoot (BEL) | Lotto–Soudal | + 37' 21" |
| 6 | Paweł Poljański (POL) | Tinkoff–Saxo | + 39' 24" |
| 7 | Emanuel Buchmann (GER) | Bora–Argon 18 | + 42' 33" |
| 8 | Rohan Dennis (AUS) | BMC Racing Team | + 44' 13" |
| 9 | George Bennett (NZL) | LottoNL–Jumbo | + 53' 26" |
| 10 | Louis Meintjes (RSA) | MTN–Qhubeka | + 57' 43" |

=== Team classification ===
Final team classification (1–10)
| Rank | Team | Time |
|---|---|---|
| 1 | Movistar Team | 92h 07' 53" |
| 2 | Lampre–Merida | + 13' 45" |
| 3 | Tinkoff–Saxo | + 22' 50" |
| 4 | AG2R La Mondiale | + 43' 18" |
| 5 | Astana | + 45' 33" |
| 6 | Orica–GreenEDGE | + 52' 57" |
| 7 | Team Sky | + 55' 08" |
| 8 | Cannondale–Garmin | + 1h 01' 59" |
| 9 | Lotto–Soudal | + 1h 03' 56" |
| 10 | BMC Racing Team | + 1h 05' 25" |
