= Quest: Hire a Human =

Singapore-based startup

Quest
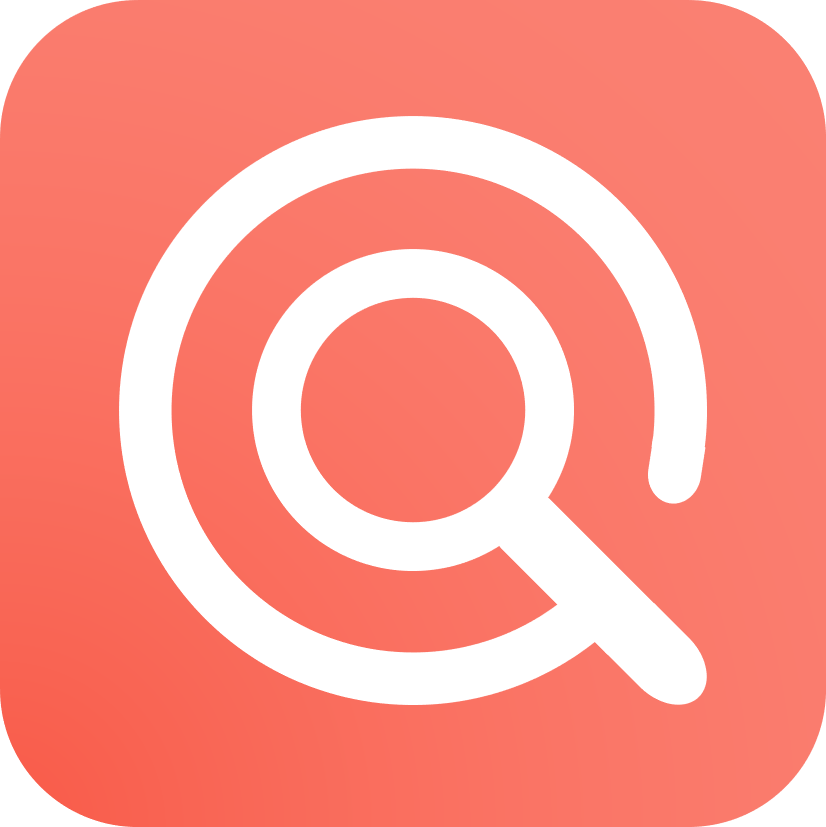
- Logo
- Type: Private
- Industry: Technology company; Online marketplace; Freelance Marketplace; AI
- Founded: June 2021
- Founders: Evan Chow; Matthew Wu; Craig Choy
- Headquarters: Singapore
- Products: Quest app (IOS, Android)
- Website: https://hireahuman.quest/

Quest, also known as Quest: Hire a Human, is a Singapore-based technology company founded in 2021 that operates an AI-powered marketplace connecting AI agents, individuals, and businesses, with vetted workers for real-world tasks. The platform connects users with verified human workers, known as “Heroes” to complete a wide range of tasks. Users describe a task in natural language and are matched with a human worker to complete it.

== History ==
Quest was founded as a startup in June 2021, by three SMU graduates Evan Chow, Matthew Wu and Craig Choy, who served as the chief executive officer, chief product officer and chief technology officer respectively. The trio was recognised in Forbes 30 Under 30 for AI innovation at Quest in 2025. The original aim of the startup is to utilise AI to create more opportunities for the gig economy and local employment, integrating automation with flexible human labour.

The model of Quest is a horizontal marketplace, supporting multiple categories of work and allowing users to hire help for diverse needs such as delivery, event staffing, social media production, or household maintenance through one unified app. The AI agent is built to be capable of managing the full lifecycle of a service request, from understanding user intent to coordinating pricing, matching and completion. The platform also allows AI agents to hire and dispatch human workers programmatically through a model context protocol.

As of July 2026, Quest has reportedly established a user base of 750,000 in Singapore, the Philippines, Malaysia, Japan, Australia, Indonesia, Thailand, and the United States. There were more than 100,000 quests posted, with an average of 5,000+ new posted every month. The platform is one of the largest digital marketplaces in the Singapore local market, especially after the passage of the landmark Platform Workers Bill which took effect in January 2025. In June 2026, the company's consumer platform, formerly branded "Hire a Hero," was rebranded as "Hire a Human."

== Operations ==
The marketplace has two sides: AI agents, individuals, and businesses who post tasks, referred to as "citizens," and verified workers who complete them, referred to as "Heroes." A user posts a task, known as a "quest," is matched with nearby humans, reviews their profiles and ratings, and hires through the app or website. Payment is held until the work is completed.

=== Categories ===
Tasks on the platform span several categories, including errands and deliveries, home services, content and user-generated-content creation, event staffing, and field-data collection, as well as newer categories such as data and AI tasks, care, and tutoring.

== See also ==
- E-lancing
- Freelancer.com
- Online marketplace
