= Paul Rivière =

French resistance fighter (1912–1998)

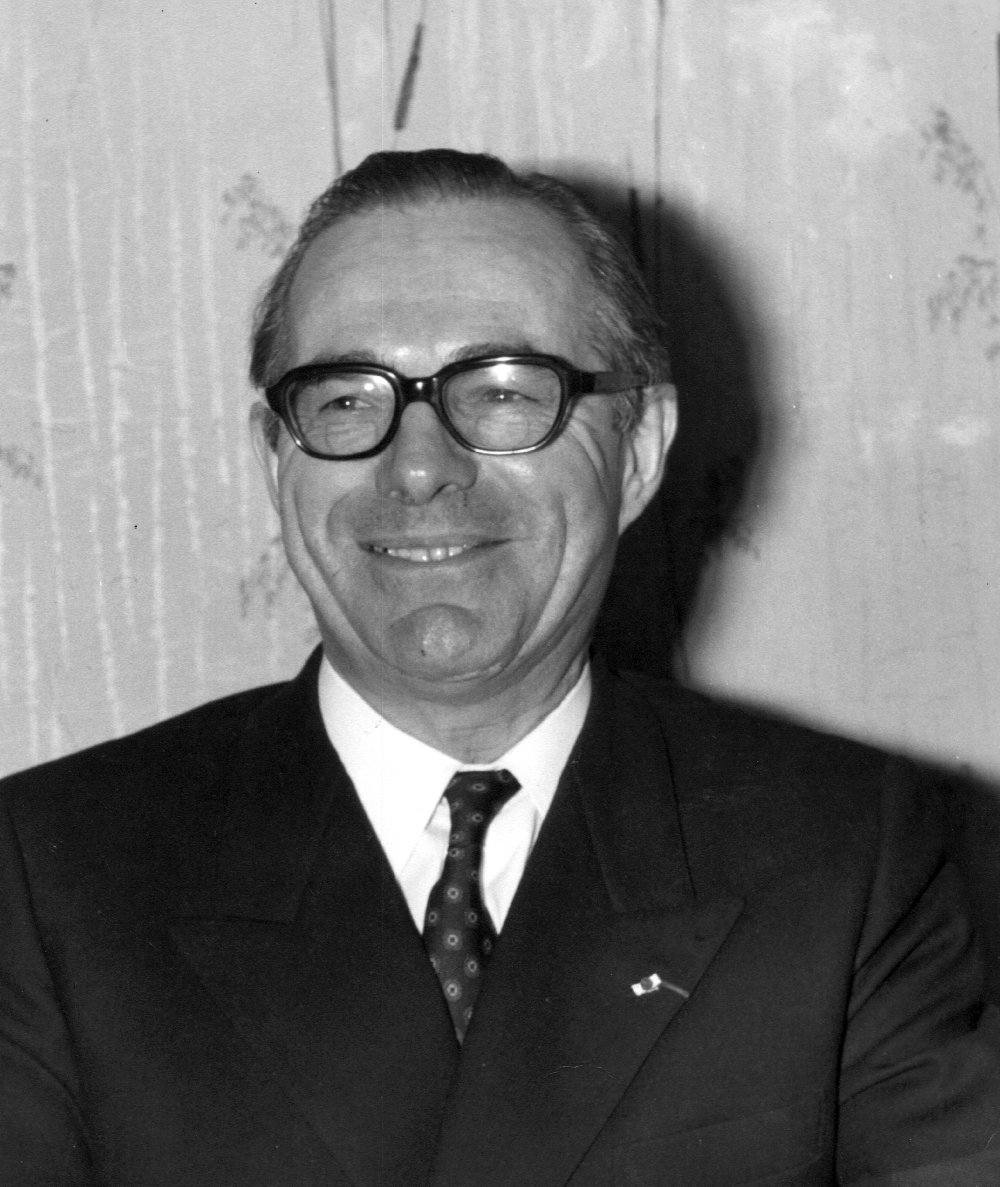
- Paul Rivière in 1969
- Born: 22 November 1912; Montagny, France
- Died: 15 December 1998 (aged 86); Lyon, France
- Known for: French Resistance fighter, Head of Operations for the Rhône-Alpes Region

Paul Rivière (22 November 1912 – 15 December 1998) was a French Resistance fighter and politician. He joined the Resistance from 1941 and took part in the Indochina and Algeria Wars.

== Biography ==
=== Early life ===
Paul Rivière was born in Montagny in the Loire Department in central France.

=== Resistance activities ===
In 1939, he was called up as an instructor for Cadets de Saumur. He was injured during the fighting for Pont de Gennes, then demobilised and returned to his position as a literature professor in the Saint-Joseph Jesuit Day School in Lyon.

In late February 1941, Father Chaillet, Jesuit in Lyon, put him in touch with Henri Frenay and Berty Albrecht and he became involved in the French resistance.

In early 1942, he abandoned propaganda for action and became liaison officer for Jean Moulin, General Charles de Gaulle's representative in France and the leader of the internal Resistance.

After a first airdrop, he was arrested and detained for four months by the Vichy France Police. Upon his release, he continued his mission clandestinely until the end of War. With the Mouvements unis de la Résistance (MUR), he was deeply involved in the organization of radio transmission services and covert air operations for Southern France.

After the Jean Moulin arrest in Caluire, he was ordered by the Bureau Central de Renseignements et d'Action to reorganize the Landing-Airdrop Section (in French "Section Atterrissages-Parachutages" or SAP).

He controlled the SAP until the end of War and was Head of Operations for the Rhône-Alpes Region where he organized the most important covert landing and airdrop operations : several hundred of tons of weapons and equipment and millions of French francs were so routed to the French resistance.

He also organized the transfer of numerous personalities and agents between France and London: General Jean de Lattre de Tassigny, Vincent Auriol, Emmanuel d'Astier de la Vigerie, Jacques Chaban-Delmas, Maurice Bourgès-Maunoury, François de Menthon, Henri Frenay, Daniel Mayer, Christian Pineau, Lucie and Raymond Aubrac.

=== After the war ===
He joined the military service in 1947 with the rank of lieutenant-colonel. He was Inspector General of the French Armed Forces, then he was sent to Indochina for two years in 1953, to Konstanz in Germany in 1955 then to Algeria in 1956.

From December 1956 to 1959, he was Military Attache in Tokyo, then security adviser in Algeria until Évian Accords.

From November 1962 until 1978, he was a member of the National Assembly, deputy of the Loire Department from 1962 to 1978 and mayor of Montagny, Loire until 1983. During the same period, he sat on the Council of Europe.

He died on 15 December 1998 in Lyon and was buried in Montagny.

== Pseudonyms during French resistance ==
- François
- Charles-Henri
- Sif bis
- Galvani
- Marquis

== Military honours ==
- Commander of the Legion of Honour
- Order of Liberation
- War Cross 1939–1945 (6 citations)
- Cross for Military Valour (3 citations)
- Medal of the Resistance with Officer rosette
- Colonial Medal with clasp "Far East"
- Cross of the Volunteer Combatant of the Resistance
- Escapees' Medal
- Officer of the Most Excellent Order of the British Empire
- Military Medal
- Order of the Crown (Belgium) (Officer)
- War Cross (Belgium) with Palm
- Czechoslovak War Cross
- Cross for Military Valour (Poland)

== Bibliography ==
- Hugh Verity, "We landed by moonlight", Crécy publishing limited, 2000
- (in French) Centre d'Histoire de la Résistance et de la Déportation, "Fonds d'archives Geneviève et Paul Rivière" – Les opérations aériennes (atterrissages, parachutages) en zone sud. 1941 - 1944, Les grands fonds d'archives du CHRD, N°1.
- (in French) Noguères Henri, Degliame-Fouche Marcel, Vigier Jean-Louis, Histoire de la Résistance en France de 1940 à 1945, 5 vol, Paris, Robert Laffont, 1967–1981.
- (in French) Vistel Alban, La nuit sans ombre. Histoire des mouvements unis de résistance, leur rôle dans la libération du sud-est, Paris, Fayard, 1970.
- All the personal archives of Paul et Geneviève Rivière are freely accessible in the Center for the History of the Resistance and Deportation in Lyon, France.
