= Fool's errand =

Type of practical joke

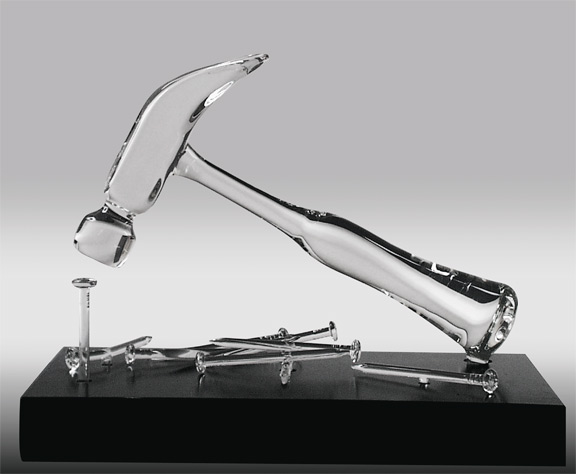
Hammer and Nails (1977) by Hans Godo Frabel. A "glass hammer" is a highly impractical object which an apprentice might be sent to fetch as part of a fool's errand.

A fool's errand is a type of practical joke where a newcomer to a group, typically in a workplace context, is given an impossible or nonsensical task by older or more experienced members of the group. More generally, a fool's errand is a task almost certain to fail.

Many such errands require the victim to travel some distance and request an impossible object by name; the prank will be widely known within the peer group as an in-joke, and the person they ask for the object will play along, often by sending the victim on to make the same request elsewhere.

The errand is an example of a hazing ritual through which a newcomer gains acceptance into a group. The prank's recurrence and similarity in different cultures reflect an exploitation of a universal psychological adaptation for communication under information asymmetry, used by experts to assert a dominance hierarchy.

== Examples ==
- One type of North American fool's errand is the "snipe hunt". The hunters are typically led to an outdoor spot at night and given a bag or pillowcase along with instructions that can include either waiting quietly or making odd noises to attract the creatures. The other group members leave, promising to chase the snipe toward the newcomer; instead, they return home or to camp, leaving the victim of the prank alone in the dark to discover that they have been duped and left "holding the bag". As an American rite of passage, it is often associated with summer camps and groups such as the Boy Scouts.
- At a deli, someone might be told to ask for "dill dough", described as a pickle-infused bread. When spoken, it becomes obvious as the person pronounces 'dill dough' as 'dildo', an adult toy.
- New car salespeople are often sent to different dealerships around town to get the "lot stretcher". After reaching the new dealership, the manager informs the victim that it has been moved to another dealership across town, and the prank continues. Also among vehicle-related errands are obtaining "high-speed air" (for tires), likewise "aerodynamic lugnuts".
- New car repair staff are requested to collect fresh spark plug sparks, by catching sparks from a grinder disc using a small box. Other similar items are "diesel engine spark plugs" (diesels do not have spark plugs), "exhaust pressure bearings" or "piston returner springs".

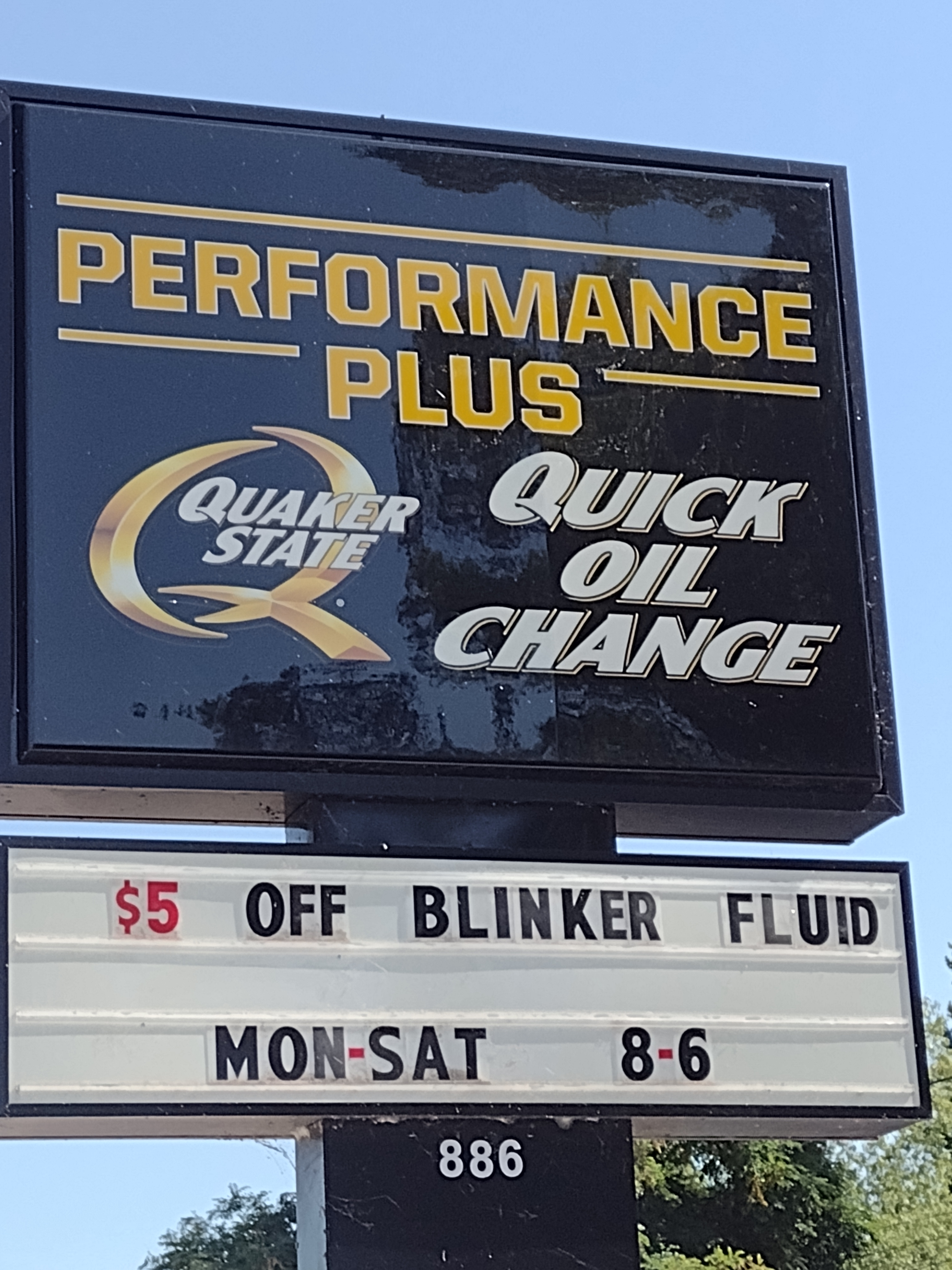
An example: "blinker fluid" does not exist.

- A common fool's errand is to send someone to get "blinker fluid" or "turn-signal fluid" from an automotive parts store.
- In baseball, a manager or a coach will ask a new batboy to fetch them a "box of curveballs" or "the keys to the batter's box." Major League pitcher Rick Sutcliffe would often perform this prank.
- In the pizza-making business, newcomers are told to look in the fridge for the "dough repair kit".
- Another variation includes being sent to procure a "long weight" or "long stand", the idea being that the dupe will reach the shop (or equivalent source of the mythical object) and place the request. The victim is then delayed by the shopkeeper and thus receives a long wait.
- Other common restaurant practical jokes include sending the new employee to another restaurant to borrow the "bacon stretcher", "lobster food", "lobster gun", "souffle pump", left-handed tongs, "oven key", left-handed broom, or "can of steam". An alternative prank is to instruct the new employee to empty a coffee machine or hot water tower of its water (the machine being connected to a water line and thus never able to be emptied).
- In the decorating and construction trade, a "left-handed screwdriver", "board stretcher", "eye measures", "hammer grease", "wall expander", "glass hammer", "striped or tartan paint", "metric crescent wrench", "bucket of grinder sparks" or "box of assorted knots" are analogous pranks. Another such errand subject, "polka-dot paint", became real in the 1950s with the development of a polychromatic paint which created a dotted effect when dry.
- Electricians commonly send the "new guy" to the toolroom to fetch a "cable stretcher" or a "cordless wire"/"wireless cable".
- Theatrical electricians would send the new guy to clean old color gels. Being mounted in fixtures for many performances, they accumulate dust. Old color filters were made using gelatin, and because the high heat of the lights have turned them too brittle to handle, they shatter when touched.
- In the United States Navy, pranks have included sending a new sailor after a "BT punch" (a fist-punch) from a boiler technician who works in the engine room; "red lamp oil for the port running light" and "green lamp oil for the starboard running light"; a "gallon of prop wash"; and "sound-powered phone batteries". Other examples are to send the dupe on a search for the "key of the starboard watch", a "spool of water line", "liquid bulkhead (wall) remover", a "dropped gig line", a "bucket of steam", grease for the relative bearings, keys to the steam chest, or the infamous "ID-10-T (idiot) form".
- In the United States Air Force, a new airman may be asked to stand in front of an aircraft and move back and forth in order to calibrate the weather radar before takeoff. Another request of new aviators is to assist in an air quality check, where they are required to run around the cabin of an aircraft with a plastic trash bag and fill it with air before tying it off and writing the name of the air quality project on it "I-D-10-T". This would then be proudly presented to maintenance personnel upon landing.
- In the United States Army, a newly-stationed soldier may be asked to locate a box of grid squares, or capture a Humvee exhaust sample with a trash bag. They may also be asked to go fetch the keys to a Humvee (Humvees do not have keys and are started by a button press.) Another prank involves a squad leader or team leader ordering the dupe to locate a PRC-E7 (PRC- pronounced prick- being an abbreviation of portable radio communications, and E-7 corresponding to the grade of a sergeant, first class).
- In Boy Scouts, sending a new camper over to other campsites to borrow a "left-handed smoke bender (or shifter)", a "sky hook," "elbow grease", or "100 feet of shoreline" are similar practices. As well as a "yolk strainer" for removing wood ash from your eggs or a "smoke sifter" for keeping smoke out of your eyes based on various unwritten oral sources.
- In the Czech Republic, if one breaks a spirit level, they might be asked to go and "buy a new bubble". Other construction-related jokes include buying a "brick bender", "a bender straightener", or "aerosol nails".
- In the Czech Republic, a child might be sent to the pharmacy to buy some "semosel". Spelled correctly, jsem osel means "I am a fool", literally "I am a donkey".
- In oil fields internationally, new hires may be told to get the "keys to the v-door". The v-door is a steel ramp, not a door.
- In the United Kingdom, construction-related jokes often include asking new workers to get "a skirting board ladder", "a bucket of steam", "rubber nails" or "a battery-powered electric plug".
- In Hungary, people might be sent to fetch a "bend-drill", a "circular tri-square", a "glass-flattener mallet", some "compression", or "filing grease", among other things.
- Frequently percussion parts for band and orchestra will have tacet movements (movements with no playing). More experienced players will send newer players to "go retrieve the tacet" from the closet.
- In Germany, the new apprentice is sent out to fetch new "cracking cartridges for the torque wrench", fetch "gearbox sand" or the "thread hammer".
- In the Netherlands, a new guy on a workshop or construction site is sent out to get the "vierkante gatenboor" literally "square hole drill"

== See also ==
- Hazing
- List of practical joke topics
- Prank call
