= Old Enough! =

Japanese television series

- はじめてのおつかい (Hajimete no Otsukai)
- Genre: Reality television
- Created by: Junji Ōuchi
- Directed by: Junji Ōuchi, Kiyotaka Tokuei, Takehiro Moriishi
- Starring: George Tokoro, Hiroko Moriguchi
- Narrated by: Shinsuke Chikaishi, Kanako Irie
- Opening theme: "Do Re Mi Fa Daijōbu", by B.B.Queens
- Country of origin: Japan
- Original language: Japanese

Production
- Producers: Masao Takahashi, Ako Fukuyo, Sachiko Yano, Hiro Tsuchiya
- Production company: Nippon Television

Original release
- Network: NNS (NTV)
- Release: 1991 – present

Old Enough! (Japanese: はじめてのおつかい, romanized: Hajimete no Otsukai, lit. 'My First Errand') is a Japanese reality show that has been aired irregularly since 1991 on Nippon Television. The program depicts, in a documentary manner, the efforts of toddlers going on an errand on their own, buying groceries and delivering packages, accompanied by the camera crew. The program has been distributed internationally since 2022 on Netflix.

== History ==
The show was a segment of the information program Tsuiseki (Japanese: 追跡, lit. 'The Chase'") that aired on NTV from April 1988 to March 1994, but after the program ended, it began to be broadcast irregularly as a one-shot special program of two to three hours under the title Hajimete no Otsukai. Yoriko Tsutsui and Akiko Hayashi's picture book of the same name (published in English as Miki's First Errand) was the inspiration for the program's launch.

Most of the children who try to perform errands are between 3 and 6 years old (nursery school children and kindergarteners), but in rare cases, children as young as 1 or 2 years old have also participated. Since the parents basically do not provide notes, but only verbally tell their children what they want, there are many cases where children forget to buy items for the errands or make a mistake.

Currently, a winter special (broadcast on the first Monday of January or Coming of Age Day) and a summer special (broadcast on Marine Day) are broadcast twice a year. In addition to new works, the program also broadcasts the "XX years since then..." series, in which past participants and their children are reported on how they have grown up today.

One of the children featured on the show became a parent years later, and decided to send their own child on their first errand.

Old Enough! has been distributed internationally on Netflix since March 31, 2022, stripped down to ten- to twenty-minute segments focusing only on the children's errands.

== Preparations ==
The children who participate in the show are chosen after a selection process. Before the filming, the program staff and the parents inspect the errand routes, checking to avoid dangers and suspicious people; the people in the neighborhood are informed beforehand. The camera and safety crew accompany the children from close by.

== International version ==
Two international editions of Old Enough! have been confirmed. In 2018, a Singaporean-English version of Old Enough! aired on CNA. The show was part of the On The Red Dot before being spun off to a main show in 2021.

A Canadian version of Old Enough! produced by Blue Ant Media made its debut on TVO in September 2024, with Canadian comedian Colin Mochrie as narrator.
