= Polka-dot paint =

Typically fictional product

Red on yellow polka dots

Polka dot paint is a paint of "polka dot color", i.e., a paint which paints an object with a polka dot pattern.

The paint is traditionally the subject of a fool's errand prank played upon apprentices in the decoration or construction trade, who are sent to fetch a bucket of polka-dot paint. A polka-dot paint effect has been produced in stage magic, and in the 1950s, a polychromatic paint was invented which created a dotted effect when dry.

== Magic tricks ==
In the United States, several magicians invented a trick in which they demonstrated painting with polka-dot paint. Paul Stadelman also performed a version of the trick where he additionally offered to paint some stripes for the audience, producing a mix of the two and saying that he "didn't get all the polka dots out of the brush".

The trick became the subject of litigation when Stadelman sued Harry Albacker for copying the trick in the 1950s. Albacker's defense was that the magic act was "old as the hills", and hence in public domain. Stadelman, in his turn was challenged by other magicians who claimed that he stole the idea from the "Barber's pole paint" trick.

The idea of the trick is simple: the object is pre-painted in the desired pattern with oil-based paint and then covered with white watercolor or whitewash. During the trick, the top watercolor is removed with a wet brush. Stadelman said that after he performed this trick at paint dealers' conventions, he would often get letters from people who wanted to market this paint.

Another version of the trick involves colorless chemicals on the object which become colored after a reaction with another chemical on the brush.

== Real paint ==
In 1950, a product called "Plextone" by Maas & Walsdtein Co. was advertised, a finishing which is a single application produced "a network of interlaced but separate colors — a 'Polka Dot' paint". In 1952, a John C. Zola patented (US 3811904) polychromatic paint, technically described as "a multicolor paint from lacquer-based colorants suspended in water". The inventor was inspired by French painter Georges Seurat, who created his impressionist effects using small dots of paint. Sapolin Paints, Inc. of New York City sold "polka-dot paint" in a spray can, which sprayed droplets of paint; the farther the can was from the surface, the smaller were the dots.

== In popular culture ==
- In The Vanishing Private cartoon (1942), private Donald Duck tries to camouflage a cannon by painting it with red, green and yellow stripes, and black polka dots, from a single bucket.
- Polka-dot nail polish and marker pens incorporate glitter or non-glitter colored particles to do the trick.
- One can create polka-dot brushes for various computer graphics software, such as Photoshop, GIMP, etc.
