= Polka dot =

Pattern consisting of an array of large filled circles of same size

Red polka dots on a yellow background

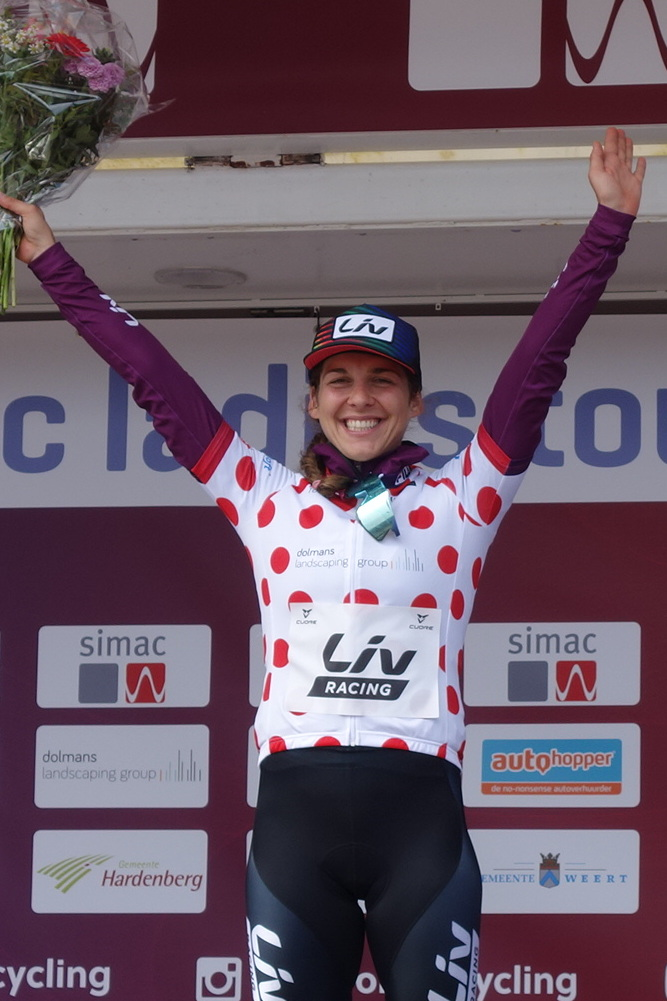
Alison Jackson wears a Queen of the Mountains polkadot cycling jersey

The polka dot, also written polkadot, and also called spot printed and spot print in the United Kingdom, is a pattern consisting of an array of large filled circles of the same size. Though the dots must be relatively large ones, and must be all the same size in any given print, different styles of polka dot prints may change the size of the dots or the distance between them.

Polka dots are commonly seen on children's clothing, toys, furniture, ceramics, and Central European folk art, but they appear in other contexts as well. The pattern rarely appears in formal contexts and is generally confined to more playful attire such as bathing suits and lingerie.

== Etymology ==
The term likely originated because of the popularity of the polka dance around the same time the pattern became fashionable, just as many other products and fashions of the era also adopted the "polka" name.

== History ==
The invention of dotted patterns is believed to have happened in the Middle Ages, but because of a lack of fabric machines and modern medicine, the pattern of irregularly spaced dots made people think of the rashes caused by diseases like leprosy, syphilis, smallpox, bubonic plague, and measles. Hence, the pattern was associated with plague and uncleanliness. The modern version of polka dots is believed to have become widespread during the Industrial Revolution (c. 1760) and the invention of the first sewing machine (in 1790), when perfectly round and evenly spaced dots could be created because of mechanized weaving.

In the 19th century, European immigrants brought the Polka dance to the United States, where it exploded in popularity between 1840 and 1890. Polka clubs formed in towns across America, and their members—especially women—began wearing dotted garments as a form of identification. The color of the dots even indicated club affiliation. This was the beginning of the polka dot as a social signature, dancing its way from ballroom floors into everyday wardrobes.

However, starting in middle of the 19th century, the pattern started to spread among the lower classes of society at that time, who were looking for more interesting colors and patterns but could not afford the silks of the upper classes. It was also at this time, the name “polka dots" is believed to be connected to an Central European dance called the polka, though the reasons behind this association are varied and mostly discredited. Before the name “polka dots” was ingrained, the dotted fabric went by various monikers, including dotted-Swiss (which possibly alludes to the holes in Swiss cheese), the Spanish name lunares, the French term quinconce, and the German word thalertupfen.

Polka dots gained popularity in the United States around the time of the Roaring Twenties, when Norma Smallwood, Miss America of 1926, wore a polka dot swimsuit, influencing the general public about the latest fad of that time.

== Usage ==
One of the earliest pieces of media that showcases the popularity of polka dots is the depiction of Minnie Mouse. The dots were left out in films because they were difficult to animate, but her spotted skirt was drawn in still images. The character started wearing an iconic red dress with white polka dots in the 1928 title card animations of the short film Plane Crazy.

Later in 1962, DC Comics introduced Polka-Dot Man with irregularly-sized and differently coloured dots. Polka-Dot Man made his first theatrical debut in the film The Suicide Squad directed by James Gunn. He was played by actor David Dastmalchian.

Since 1975, a red-on-white polka-dotted jersey has been awarded to the leader in the mountain classification of the annual Tour de France cycling race.

Some people associate polka dots with Venezuelan fashion designer Carolina Herrera, who used polka dots on most of her dresses during the late 1980s and early 1990s, as well as on the boxes of perfume Carolina Herrera, Herrera For Men, Aquaflore and Flore.

Much of the Japanese artist Yayoi Kusama's work features a polka dot motif.

The cryptocurrency Polkadot embraces dot designs from logo to mascot TOD the dot.

The polka dot also appears in popular music. "Itsy Bitsy Teenie Weenie Yellow Polka Dot Bikini" is a novelty song telling the story of a shy girl in a very revealing bathing suit who stays immersed in the ocean water to hide from view. It was written by Paul Vance and Lee Pockriss and first released in June 1960 by Brian Hyland. Before that, however, "Polka Dots and Moonbeams" was a popular song with music by Jimmy Van Heusen and lyrics by Johnny Burke, published in 1940. It was Frank Sinatra's first hit, recorded with the Tommy Dorsey Orchestra. The song is one of the top 100 most-frequently recorded jazz standards with arrangements by Gil Evans and others and notable recordings by Lester Young, Sarah Vaughn and many others.

The 1943 Twentieth Century Fox Technicolor musical film The Gang's All Here, directed by Busby Berkeley, featured a large production number "The Polka-Dot Polka". The song was written by Harry Warren and Leo Robin, referencing the 19th century polka dot craze in the lyrics, and sung by Alice Faye with the Busby Berkeley dancers.

== Gallery ==
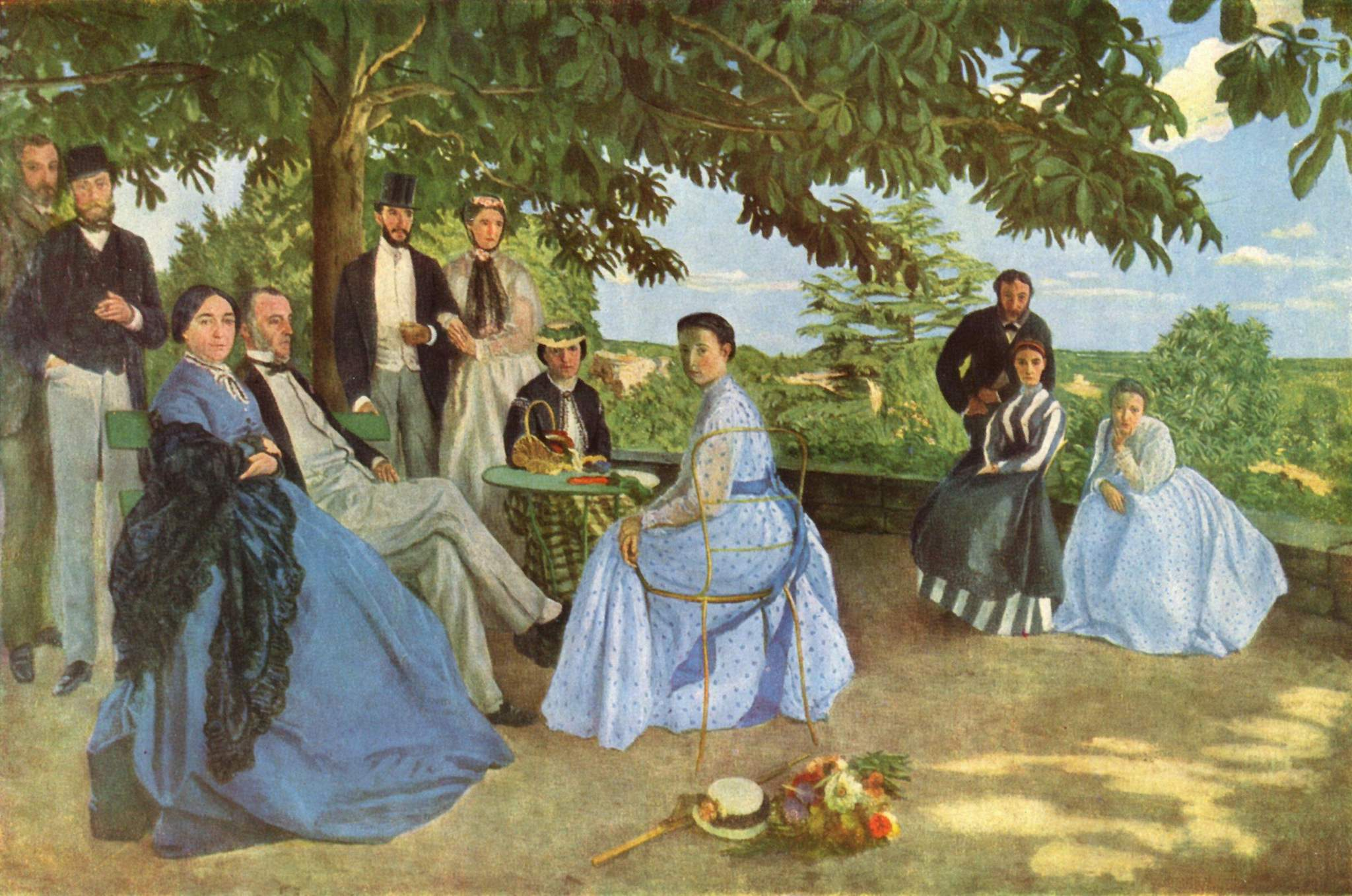
Frédéric Bazille's 1867 painting Family Reunion, containing two women in blue polka dot dresses

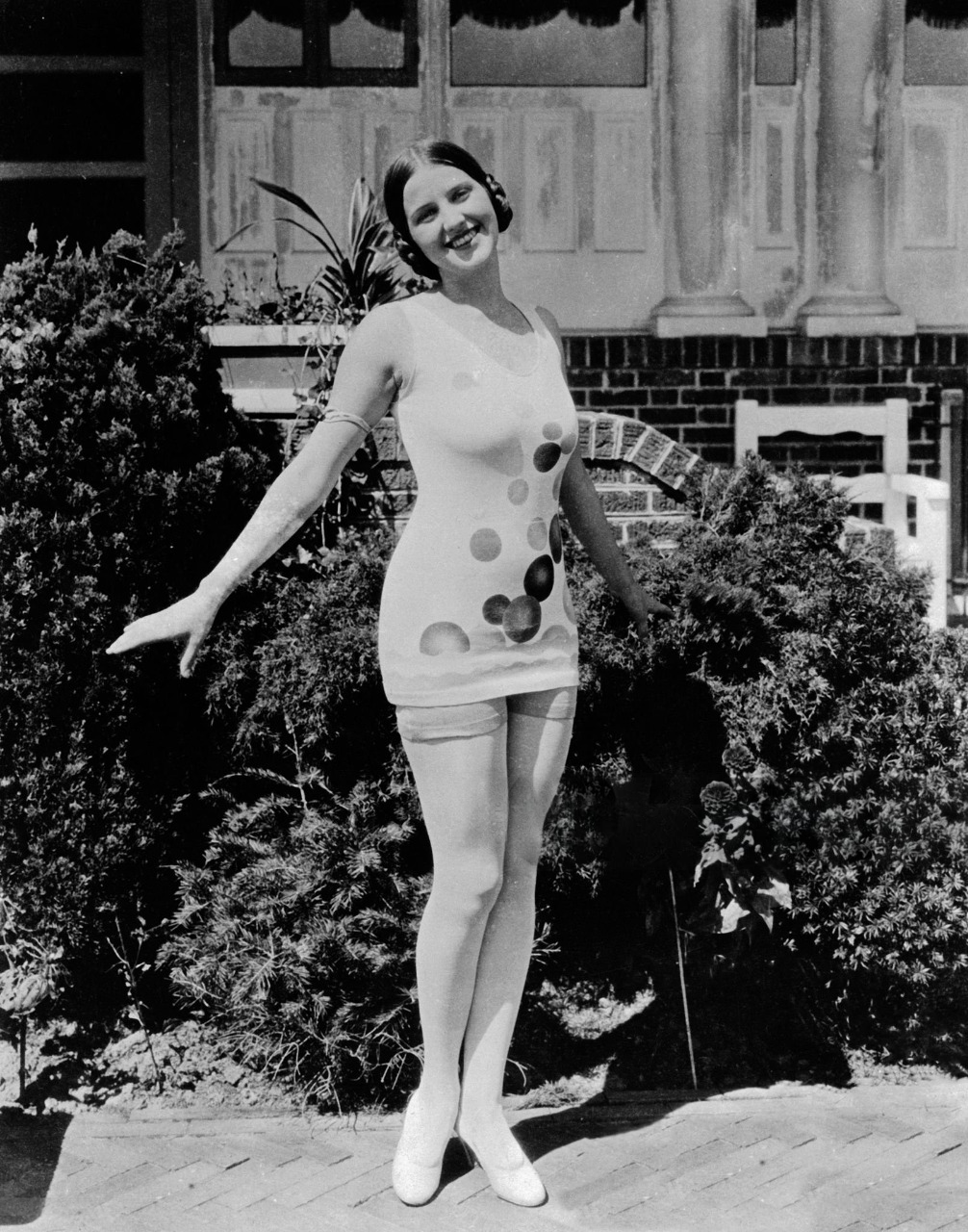
Norma Smallwood (winner of 1926 Miss America) popularized polka dots design in this publicity handsout

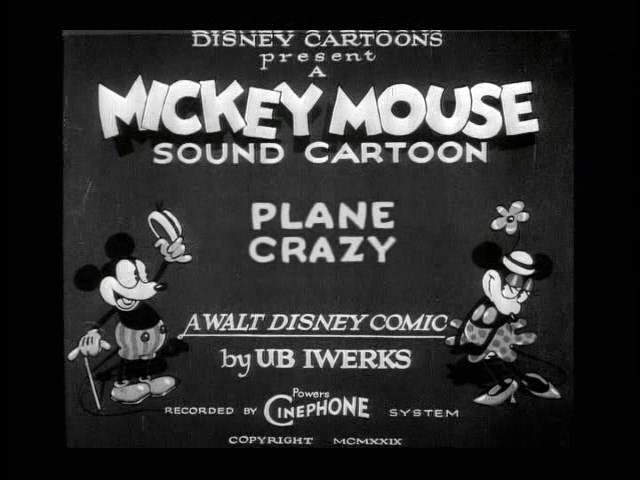
Title card of Plane Crazy animation which introduces Minnie Mouse wearing polka dots dress.

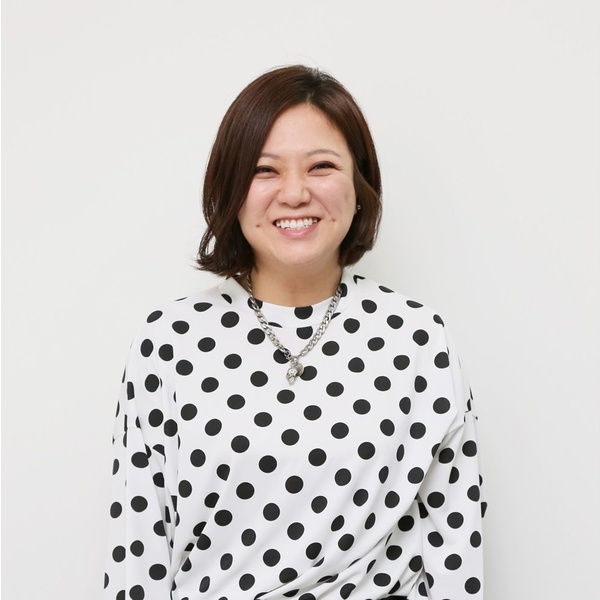
Smiling woman wearing white dress with black polka dots

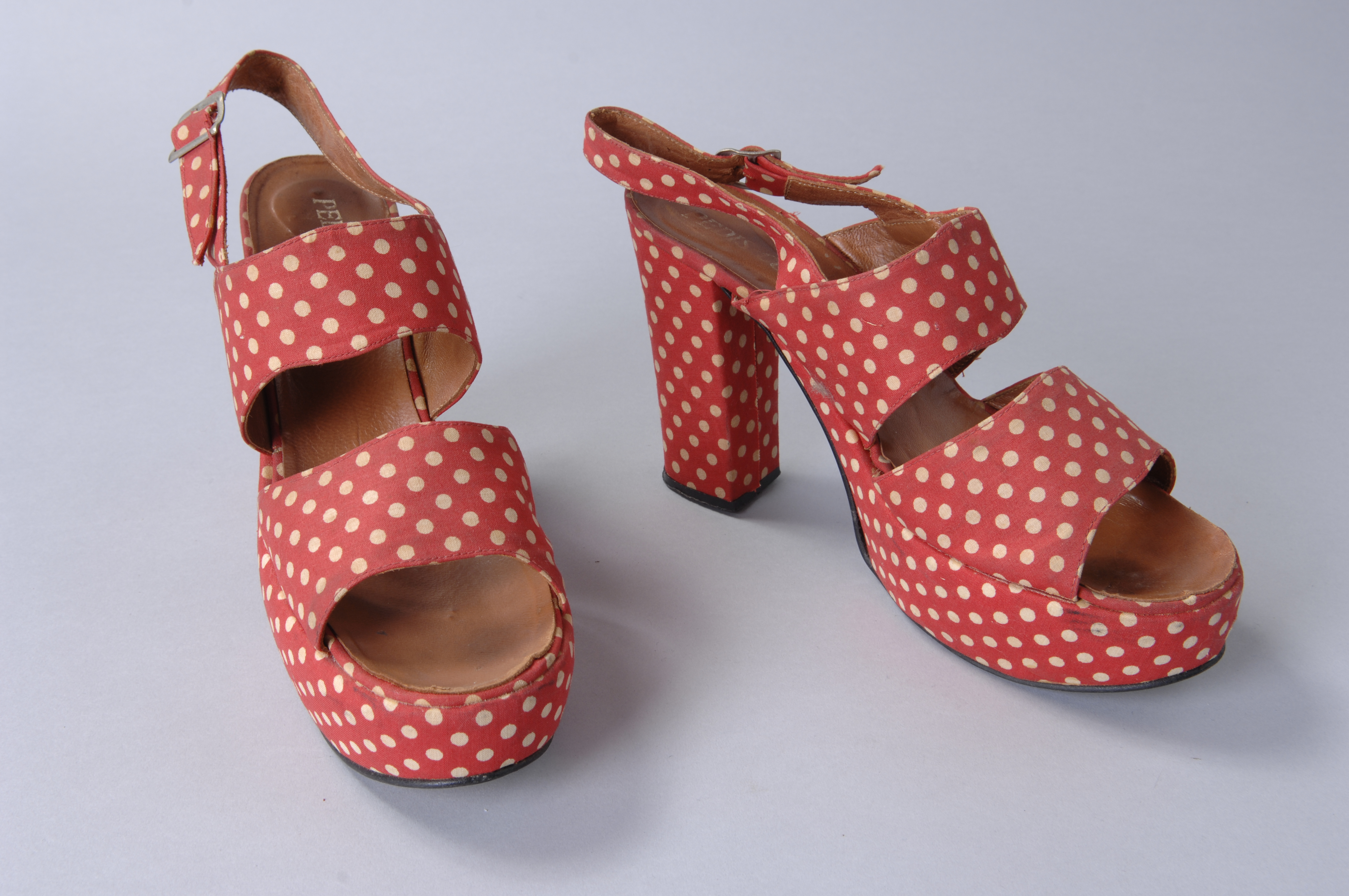
Polka dots shoes

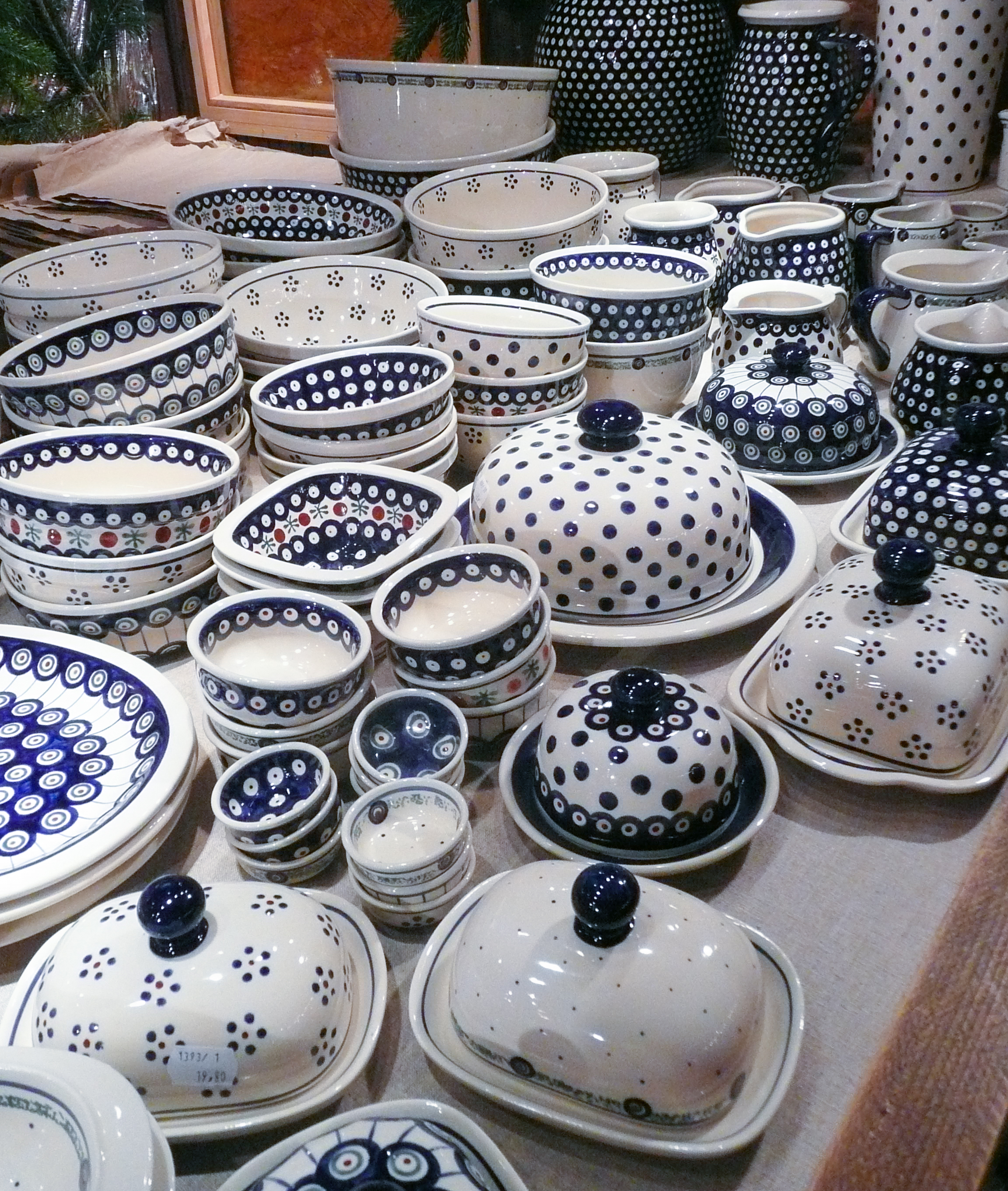
Polish Bolesławiec ceramics

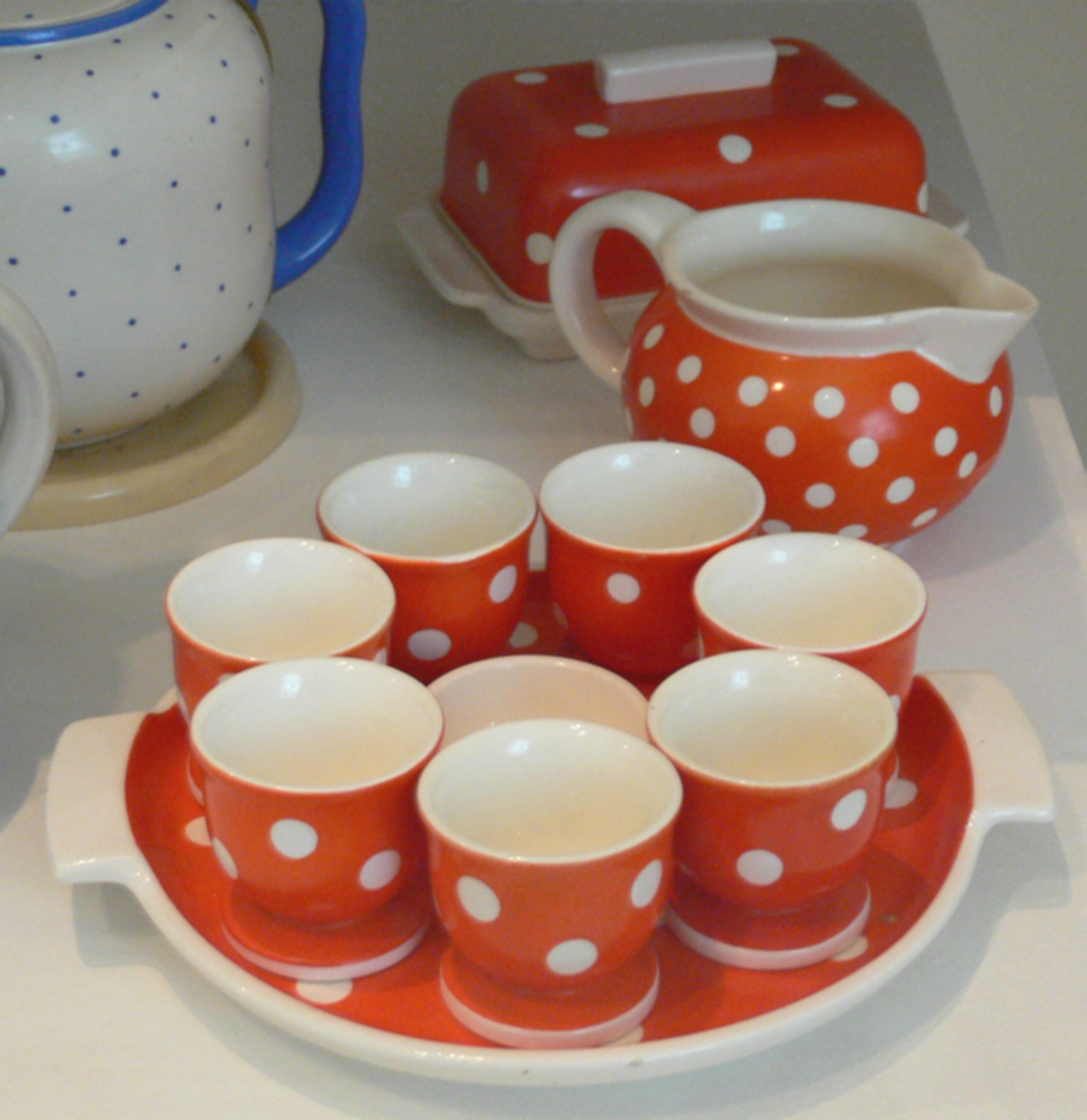
German ceramics

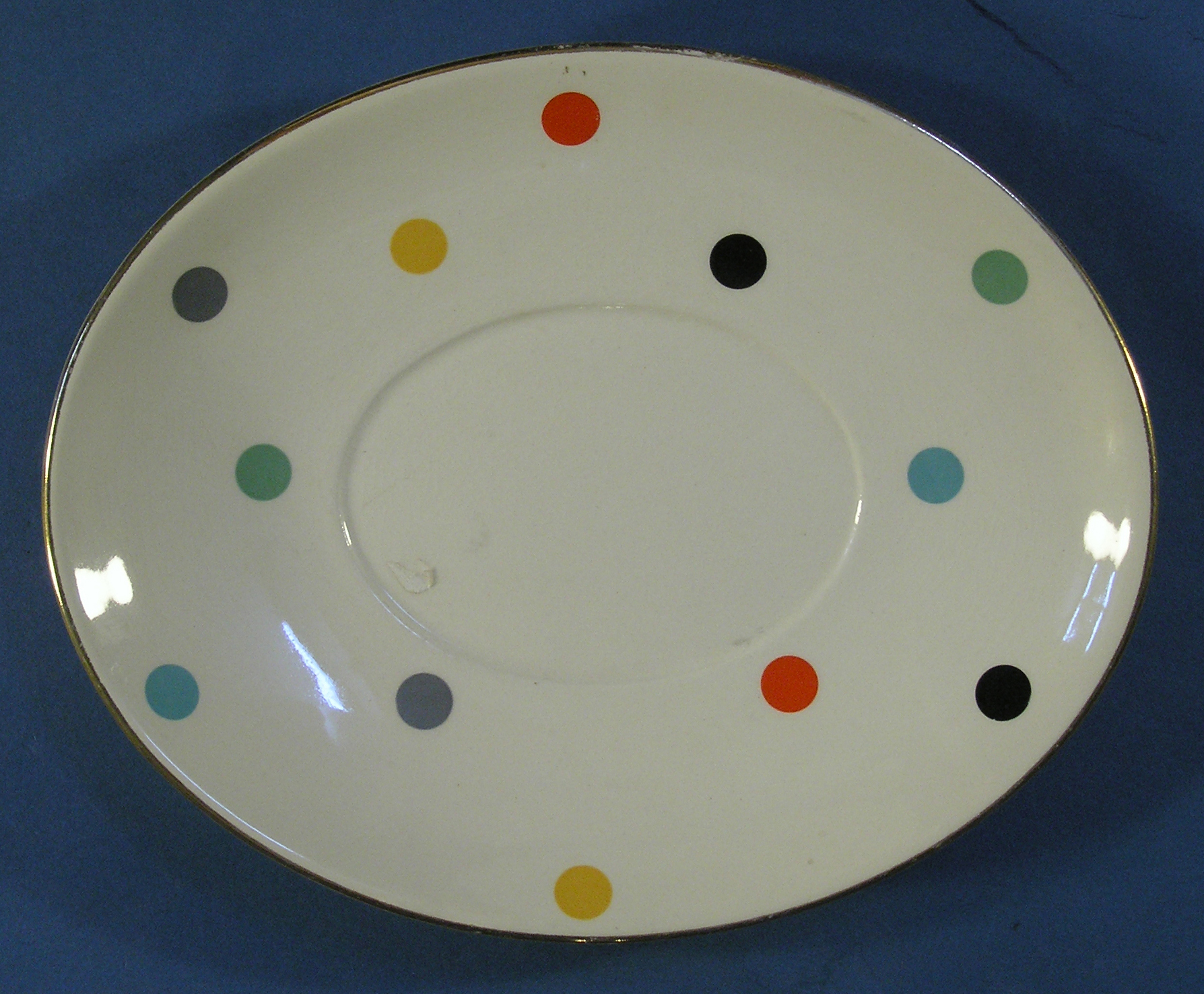
A plate patterned with multicoloured polka dots

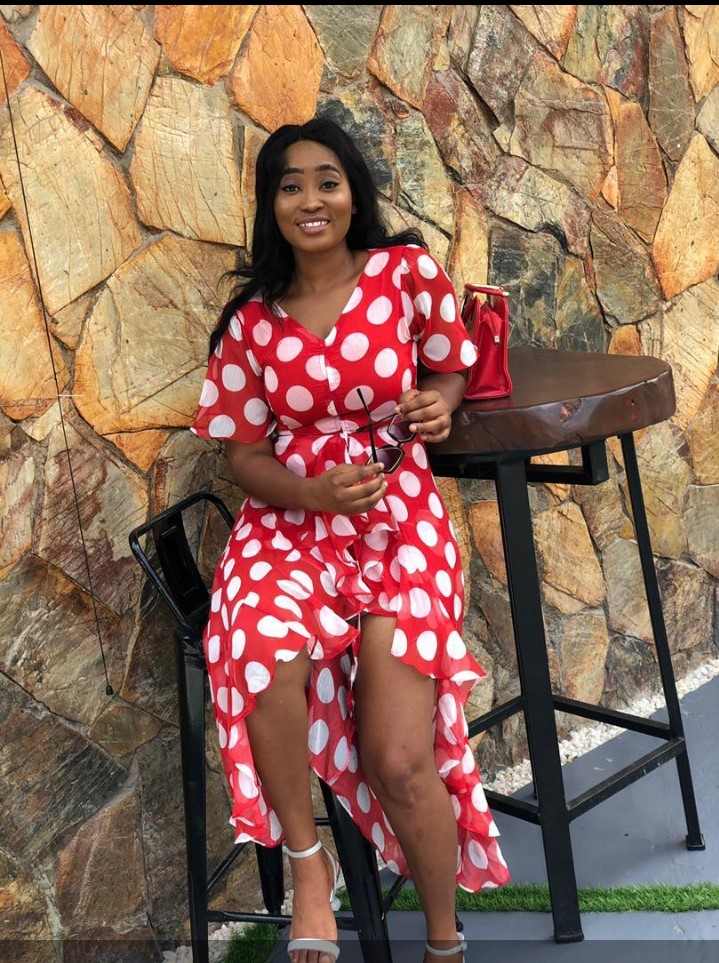
Woman in red dress with white polka dots

== See also ==
- Ben-Day dots
- Hypoestes phyllostachya
- Pardopsis punctatissima
- Polka Dot Door
- Polka-dot paint
- Stripe pattern
