= Errand =

Minor task

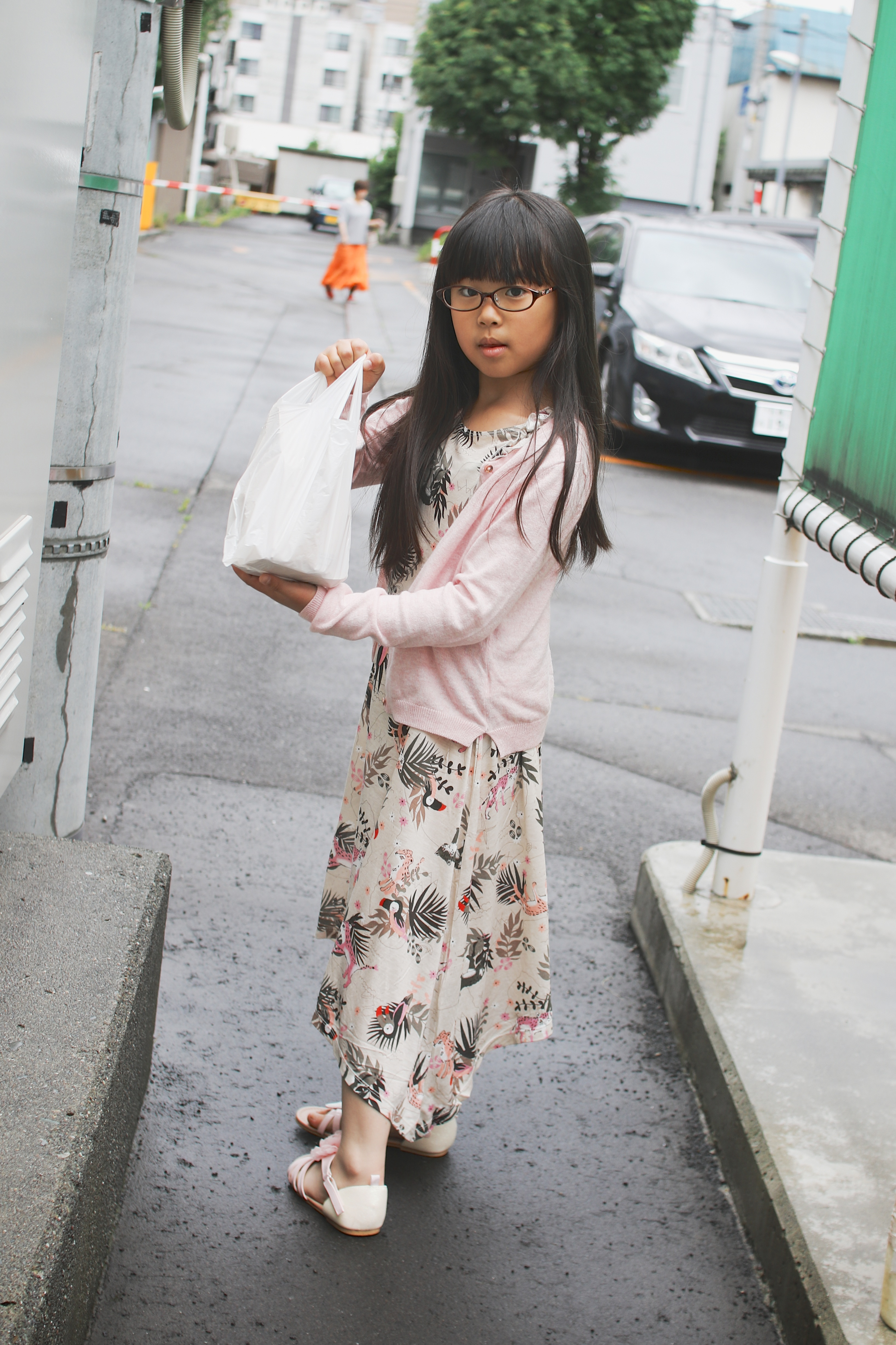
Girl on an errand picking up something from a store.

An errand is a task of no great consequence, typically concerning household or business affairs, which requires the person undertaking it to travel to a place where it can be accomplished. The activity of undertaking this task is called running an errand, while a series of such tasks undertaken in a single outing is called errand-running or running errands.

== Definitions ==
The word, errand, derives from Old English ǣrende, which in turn comes from Proto-West Germanic *ārundī, and in the Middle Ages denoted a quest or mission, such that Malory's 15th-century Le Morte d'Arthur had King Arthur asking a knight, "what is your errand?"

An "errand" can include delivering a message, for which reason an 1871 dictionary of synonyms described a message as synonymous with an errand, while allowing that an errand can be something other than a message:

ERRAND (A. S. ærende, ærend, messenger) is an object for which one goes somewhere, or is sent by another. If the object be to communicate with another in words, then the errand is so far a message. But the errand may be not of this kind, as an errand to buy something at the market. ... An errand is an act; a message is a thing of words.

== In employment ==
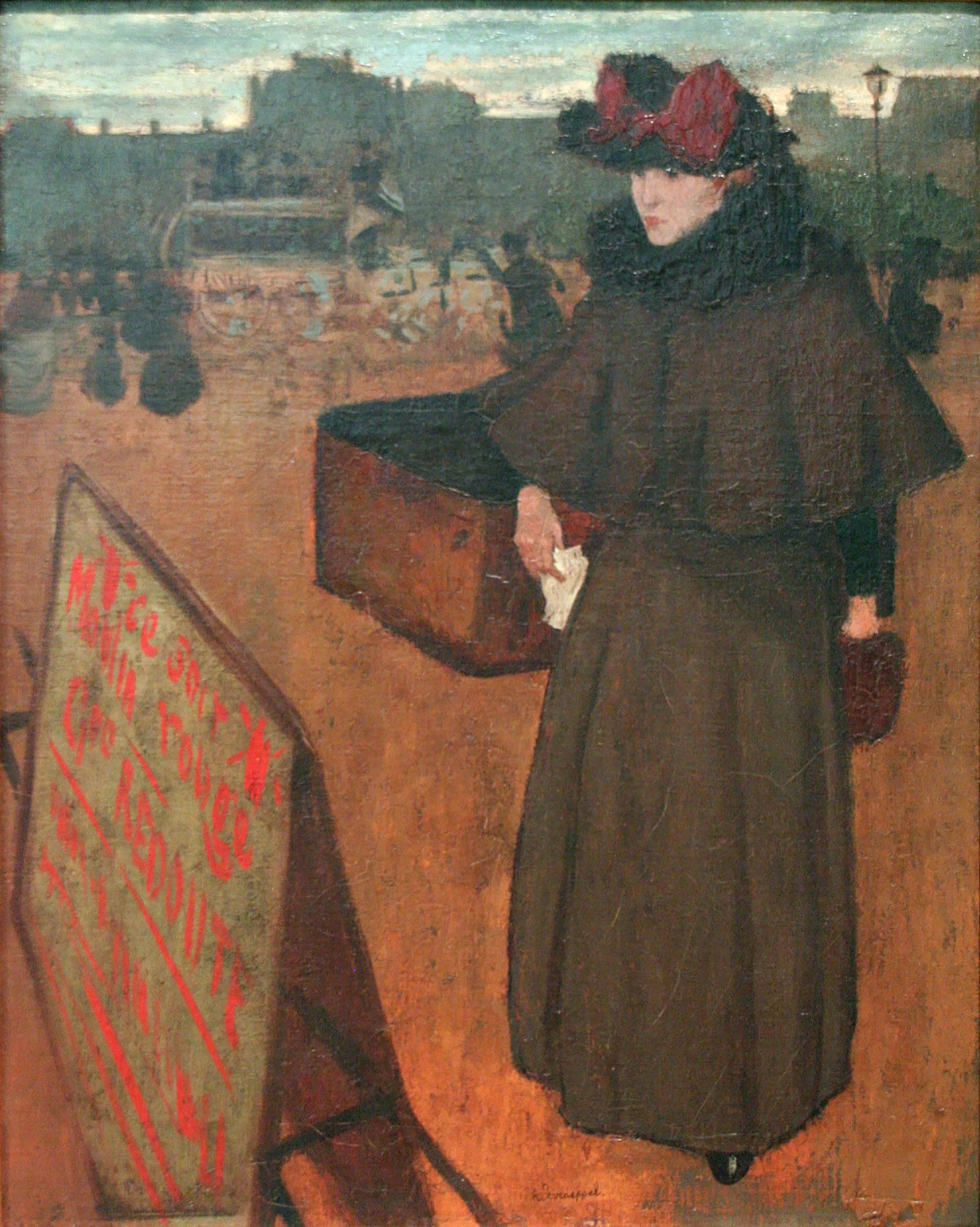
Errand Girl, a 19th century painting by Henri Evenepoel

Historically, people with more wealth or power would hire a person, typically called an errand boy or errand girl, to perform these tasks for them. The modern term for such a person is gofer (derived from the phrase go for).

In more modern times, an employer or supervisor with employees having specified job functions may be subject to legal consequences if the employer requires the employee to perform errands that are not part of their job. For this purpose, errands may be divided between those that are work-related, and those that are personal errands. A business owner or employee may also be subject to consequences for using company time or property to engage in personal errands. The liability of an employer for an injury caused by an employee departing from work-related activities to run an errand is addressed by the law of frolic and detour, under which the employer remains liable if the departure is minor.

A 1909 report on the English Poor Laws noted that "the most hopeless position is that of the errand boy at a small shop in a poor neighborhood", for whom "prospects are absolutely nil". The report further noted that those employed as errand boys were unlikely to pick up any additional skills useful in a trade.

In more recent times, some errand-running functions have been assumed by gig economy businesses that will run typical errands, such as "donation drop offs, returns, shopping, random pickups/drop offs, pharmacy runs, and food pick ups" for a small fee.

== Cultural significance ==
The running of errands may have some specific cultural significance.

The Japanese television series Old Enough! (Japanese: はじめてのおつかい, romanized: Hajimete no Otsukai, lit. 'My First Errand') depicts, in a documentary manner, the efforts of toddlers going on an errand on their own—buying groceries, delivering packages—accompanied by the camera crew. The program highlights the Japanese cultural practice of sending small children to run errands as a means of increasing their sense of independence, and has been distributed internationally since 2022 on Netflix. Most of the children who try to perform errands are between 3 and 6 years old (nursery school children and kindergarteners), but in rare cases, children as young as 1 or 2 years old have also participated. Since the parents basically do not provide notes, but only verbally tell their children what they want, there are many cases where children forget to buy items for the errands or make a mistake.

A fool's errand prank is a type of practical joke played in many parts of the world, where a newcomer to a group, typically in a workplace context, is given an impossible or nonsensical task by older or more experienced members of the group. A common fool's errand is to send someone to get "blinker fluid" or "turn-signal fluid" from an automotive parts store. More generally, a fool's errand is a task almost certain to fail.

== Errand paralysis ==
Sufficiently severe anxiety can render a person unable to run even simple errands, for which the term "errand paralysis" has been coined. This is particularly the case where an individual allows a large number of small errands to accumulate, so that the collective work to be done becomes substantial.
