= Montagny, Loire =

Montagny
- Commune
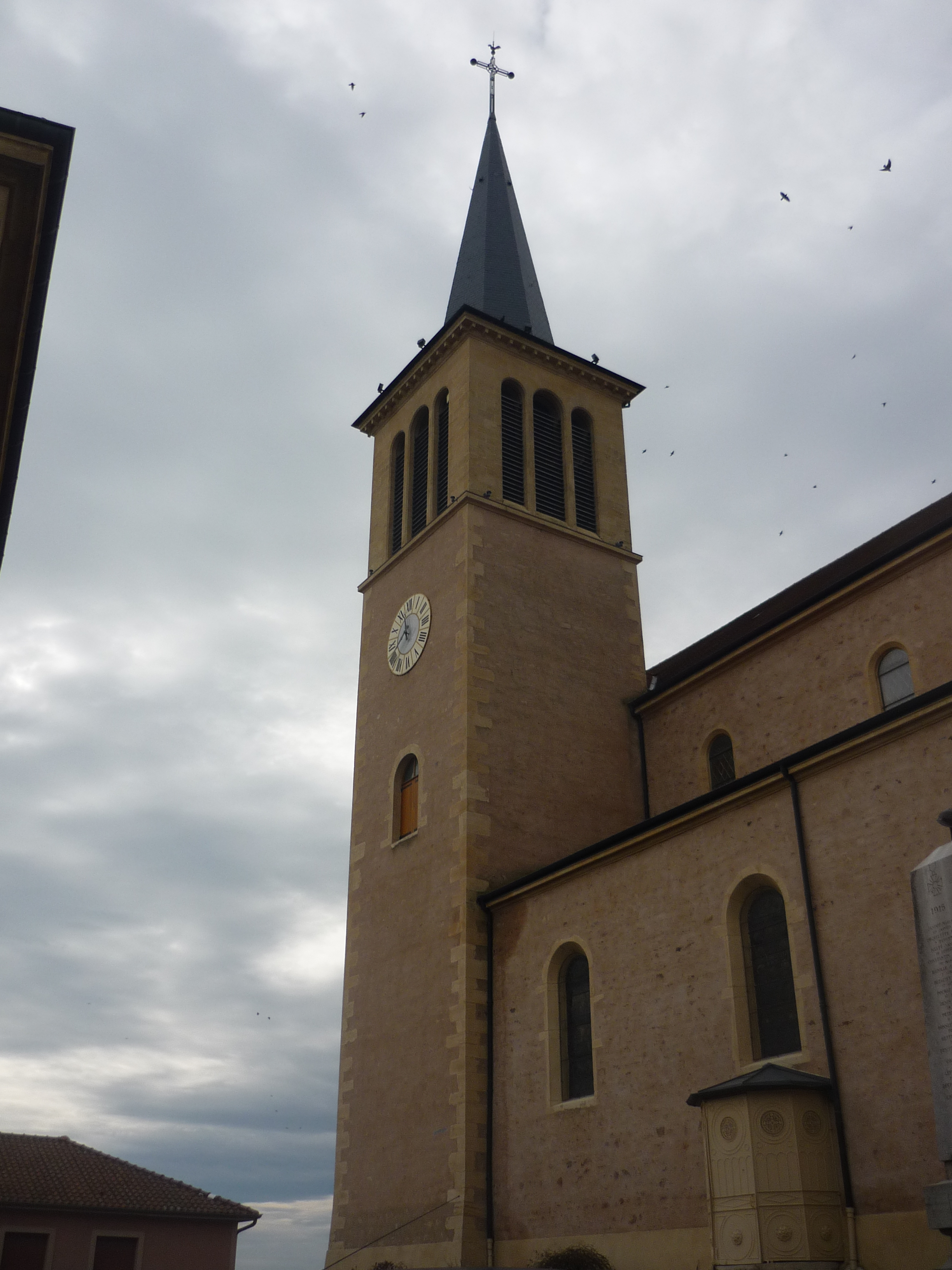

- Coat of arms
- Location of Montagny
- Location within France Location within Auvergne-Rhône-Alpes
- Coordinates: 46°02′01″N 4°14′12″E
- Country: France
- Region: Auvergne-Rhône-Alpes
- Department: Loire
- Arrondissement: Roanne
- Canton: Charlieu
- Intercommunality: Roannais Agglomération

Government
  - Mayor (2020–2026): Marcel Peuillon
- Area^{1}: 25.57 km^{2} (9.87 sq mi)
- Elevation: 490 m (1,610 ft)
- Highest elevation: 542 m (1,778 ft)
- Lowest elevation: 316 m (1,037 ft)
- Population (2023): 1,110
  - Density: 43.4/km^{2} (112/sq mi)
- Time zone: UTC+01:00 (CET)
  - Summer (DST): UTC+02:00 (CEST)
- INSEE/Postal code: 42145 /42840
- ^{1} French Land Register data, which excludes lakes, ponds, glaciers > 1 km^{2} (0.386 sq mi or 247 acres) and river estuaries.

Montagny (French pronunciation: [mɔ̃taɲi]) is a commune in the Loire department in central France.

== Population ==
Historical population
Year	Pop.	±% p.a.
1968	1,092	—
1975	1,058	−0.45%
1982	1,078	+0.27%
1990	1,124	+0.52%
1999	1,111	−0.13%
2007	1,093	−0.20%
2012	1,158	+1.16%
2017	1,049	−1.96%
2023	1,110	+0.95%
Source: INSEE

== See also ==
- Communes of the Loire department
