= List of prisoners of Ravensbrück =

Nazi concentration camp prisoners

Ravensbrück (pronounced [ʁaːvənsˈbʁʏk]) was a German concentration camp exclusively for women from 1939 to 1945, located in northern Germany, 90 km (56 mi) north of Berlin at a site near the village of Ravensbrück (part of Fürstenberg/Havel). The largest single national group consisted of 40,000 Polish women. Others included 26,000 Jews from all countries, 18,800 Russian, 8,000 French, and 1,000 Dutch. More than 80 percent were political prisoners. Many slave labor prisoners were employed by Siemens & Halske. From 1942 to 1945, medical experiments to test the effectiveness of sulfonamides were undertaken.

In the spring of 1941, the SS established a small adjacent camp for male inmates, who built and managed the camp's gas chambers in 1944. Of some 130,000 female prisoners who passed through the Ravensbrück camp, about 50,000 of them perished, some 2,200 were killed in the gas chambers.

== Female prisoners ==
- Alicja Abczyńska, Polish nurse and member of the Polish resistance
- Vera Albreht, Slovenian poet
- Louise Aslanian, French-Armenian writer, poet, French Resistance fighter (executed)
- Else Baker, German–Romani Holocaust survivor
- Elisabeth Barbier French resistance fighter, Holocaust survivor
- Ágnes Bartha, Hungarian photographer
- Lidia Beccaria Rolfi, Italian elementary teacher, writer and partisan.
- Esther Béjarano, German musician
- Maja Berezowska, Polish painter
- Henriette Bie Lorentzen, Norwegian journalist
- Halina Birenbaum, Polish writer
- Betsie ten Boom, Dutch bookkeeper
- Corrie ten Boom, Dutch watchmaker
- Aat Breur-Hibma, Dutch draftswoman and painter
- Margarete Buber-Neumann, German writer
- Erika Buchmann, German Communist
- Neus Català, Catalan socialist politician
- Anica Černej, Slovenian poet
- Klára Červenková, Czech teacher and resistance leader
- Hortense Clews, member of the Belgian Resistance
- Marie-Louise Cloarec, French spy
- Anne-Marie de Bernard de la Fosse, member of the French Resistance (survived)
- Catherine Dior, French Resistance fighter
- Eugénie Djendi, French Resistance fighter (executed)
- Andrée Dupont-Thiersault, French Resistance messenger (survived)
- Philomena Franz, Sinti writer
- Carmella Flöck, member of the Austrian Resistance
- Geneviève de Gaulle-Anthonioz, member of the French Resistance
- Louisa Gould, British member of the resistance movement in the Channel Islands
- Mirjana Gross, Croatian historian and writer
- Alena Hájková, Czech resistance fighter
- Odette Hallowes, member of the French Resistance
- Emmi Handke, German communist
- Katharina Jacob, Teacher and resistance leader
- Elisabeth Jäger resistance activist and journalist
- Milena Jesenská, Czech writer and journalist
- Margarete Jung, Communist activist
- Edith Kiss, Hungarian artist
- Katarina Konavec, Slovenian resistance activist
- Halina Krahelska, Polish writer and activist
- Karolina Lanckorońska, Polish resistance fighter
- Sonja Lapajne-Oblak, Slovenian architect, civil engineer and partisan fighter
- Violette Lecoq, French artist
- Jadwiga Lenartowicz-Rylko, Polish Catholic physician
- Simone Le Port (1920–2009), French war resistor and Ravensbrück survivor
- Lise London, French communist
- Pierrette Louin, French spy (executed)
- Rosa Manus, Dutch pacifist and suffragist
- Martha Froukje Mees
- Suzanne Mertzizen, French spy (executed)
- Josette Molland, French Resistance activist and artist; survivor
- Eileen Nearne, a.k.a. Agent Rose (escaped)
- Käthe Niederkirchner, German Communist resistance activist
- Anna Orzechowski, Polish resistance activist
- Andrée Peel, French resistance fighter
- Wanda Półtawska, Polish physician and author
- Claire Prins, (Dutch prisoner, released together with Corrie ten Boom)
- Margarete Rosenberg, survivor
- Élisabeth de Rothschild, French baroness
- Zofia Rzewuska
- Marek Rzewuski, born in Ravensbruck
- Sylvia Salvesen, author
- Cilly Schäfer, Communist Party of Germany politician
- Christl-Marie Schultes, Bavarian aviator
- Maria Skobtsova (Saint Maria Skobtsova), nun
- Elli Smula (1914–1943), tram conductor
- Ceija Stojka, Austrian Romani writer and artist
- Violette Szabo, British-French spy
- Hanna Sturm, Austrian labour rights activist
- Germaine Tambour, French Resistance fighter
- Madeleine Tambour, French Resistance fighter
- Germaine Tillion, French anthropologist and Resistance figure
- Ivanka Žnidar, Slovenian
- Krystyna Żywulska (born Zofia Landau), victims.auschwitz.org/victims/136409
- Seren Tuvel Bernstein, author of The Seamstress: A Memoir of Survival
- Rose Van Thyn, Dutch survivor
- Halszka Wasilewska, Polish military officer
- Gabrielle Weidner, Dutch resistance fighter
- Maria Wiedmaier, German activist
- Alice Wosikowski, German politician
- Krystyna Zaorska, Polish artist
- Hanna Zemer, Slovak-born Israeli journalist
- Wieke Bosch, anarchist (executed)
- Josette Renee Paule Ronserail, British-French spy
- Ivanka Perović, Croatian member of National Liberating Movement
- Martha Ndumbe, of half-Cameroonian descent (died in captivity)
- Hermine Santy, Belgian resistance member
- Frantxia Haltzuet, member of the Comet Line

== Male prisoners ==
- Jurek Becker as child
- Eugen Bolz
- Leopold Engleitner
- August Froehlich
- Juraj Herz
- Julius Leber
- Hjalmar Schacht
- Otto Schniewind
- Karl Seitz
- Fritz Wolffheim
- Roman Gutowski
