= Noëlla Rouget =

French resistant and teacher (1919–2020)

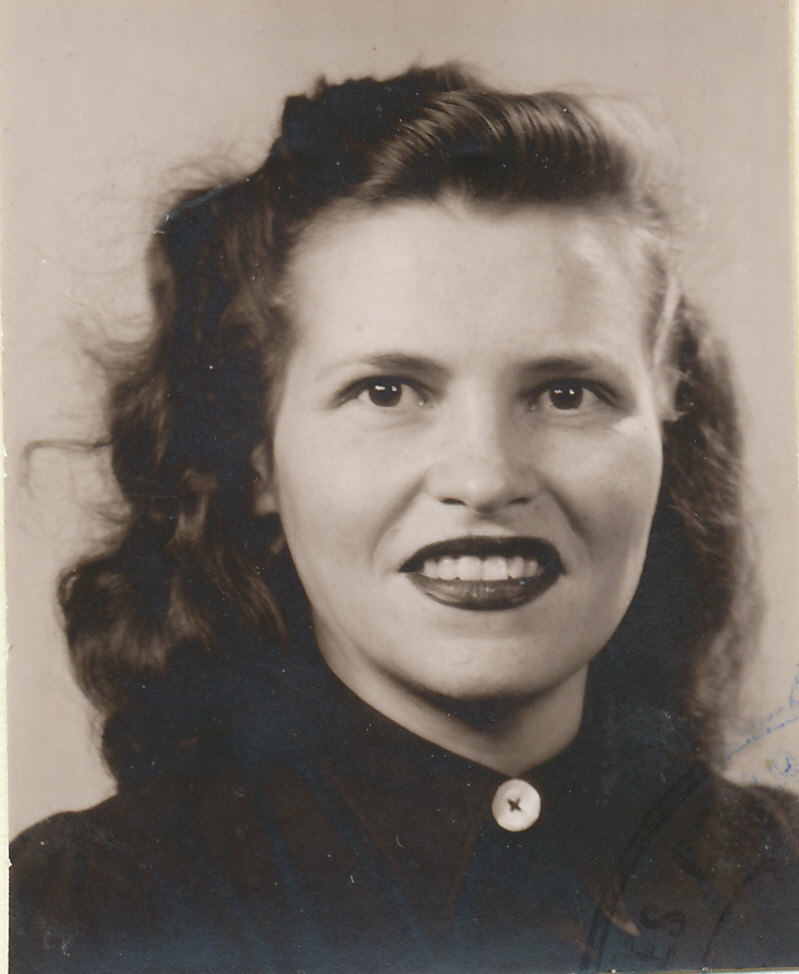
- Rouget in 1942/43
- Born: Noëlla Poudeau; 25 December 1919; Saumur, France
- Died: 22 November 2020 (aged 100); Geneva, Switzerland
- Occupations: Resistance member Teacher

Noëlla Rouget (25 December 1919 – 22 November 2020) was a French Resistance member and teacher.

She spoke of her experiences in the 1980s in Switzerland, Haute-Savoie, and Ain.

== Biography ==
Noëlla Rouget was born Noëlla Poudeau in Saumur to Clément and Marie (née Bossard) Poudeau. Her brother, Georges, was a Catholic priest and six years older than Noëlla. She attended the Scolarité au pensionnat Saint-Laud d'Angers. She was involved in Scouting with the Girl Guides of France, of which she was a leader. Although she intended to pursue a career in literature, World War II prevented her from doing so.

During the Battle of France in 1940, Rouget was working as a teacher at the Scolarité au pensionnat Saint-Laud d'Angers. She did not hear Charles de Gaulle's Appeal of 18 June, but discovered it in a leaflet while on a walk.

Angers became occupied by Nazi Germany the following day. After the occupation began, she started to distribute leaflets and underground newspapers without the knowledge of her parents. She became a liaison, carrying various packages, some of which included weapons, to fighters of the French Resistance. Her first contact was René Brossard, who later died after being tortured by the Nazis on 23 October 1943. She joined the network Honneur et Patrie, a Gaullist organization under the leadership of Victor Chatenay.

She joined the English network Buckmaster Alexandre Privet in June 1942 until her arrest, according to Captain F.W. Hazeldine. She was one of several French people to be a part of two or more networks during the War. During her resistant activities, she met Adrien Tigeot, a young teacher who had escaped the Service du travail obligatoire. The two decided to get engaged before being arrested in June 1943 and imprisoned in Angers. Tigeot was shot and killed by the Nazis on 13 December 1943. Shortly before his death, he sent a letter to Rouget encouraging her "to live, to forget, and to love".

On 9 November 1943, Rouget left Angers for the Royallieu-Compiègne internment camp. On 31 January 1944, she was deported to the Ravensbrück concentration camp with almost 1,000 others, including Geneviève de Gaulle-Anthonioz. The group arrived on 2 February. Rouget was assigned the number 27 240 and joined block 27 after being quarantined for some days. She was then forced to work 12 hours a day, six days per week. Twice, she managed to escape the gas chamber, because her fellow detainees helped her. She was able to befriend several others in the camp, including Geneviève de Gaulle-Anthonioz, Germaine Tillion, and Denise Vernay.

On 5 April 1945, Rouget, along with 300 others, were freed from the camp in exchange for 464 German prisoners in a journey that lasted four days and arrived in Kreuzlingen, Switzerland. On 10 April, her group arrived in Annemasse, France. After receiving medical treatment and taking two days to rest, she took a train back to Paris and arrived at the Gare de Lyon on 14 April.

Charles de Gaulle greeted them and was reunited with his niece, Geneviève. After a stay at the Hôtel Lutétia, Rouget returned to Angers and was reunited with her family, whom she had feared were lost during the War. She weighed 32 kg (71 lb), suffered from edema caused by tuberculosis, and was homeless.

During the summer of 1945, Geneviève de Gaulle-Anthonioz suggested that Rouget go to Switzerland for medical treatment. On 3 September, she, along with 20 others, moved to Château-d'Œux and lived in the chalet La Gumfluh, one of the nine centers set up by the Association nationale des anciennes déportées et internées de la Résistance (ADIR). There, she met her future husband, André Rouget, and the couple settled in Geneva. They had two sons, Patrick and François. André died in 2005 after much involvement in the Service Civil International and was a conscientious objector.

For a long time, like many other survivors of the Holocaust and deportations, Rouget did not speak of her experiences. However, in 1965, she was called to testify during the trial of Jacques Vasseur, head of the Gestapo in Angers who was responsible for the death of her first fiancé. Vasseur was sentenced to death, but Rouget, who had forgiven him, requested that President de Gaulle give his full pardon; ultimately, de Gaulle granted it. During the 1980s, faced with the rise of Holocaust denial, Rouget ended her silence on the matter.

When a Lausanne schoolteacher, Mariette Paschoud, publicly denied the reality of the Nazi gas chambers, Noëlla sent the teacher an open letter in the Gazette de Lausanne on 20 August 1986. The letter was also published by the magazine Voix et Faces, which published many open letters written to Holocaust deniers, some of which were previously published in the magazine L'Hebdo.

Rouget testified to her experience on the television program Temps Present, presented by Radio Télévision Suisse on 19 February 1987.

From then on, Rouget testified to her experiences at various schools across Switzerland and in the Alps regions of France. She would say, in the words of Albert Camus, "Who in this world would respond to the terrible obstinacy of crime if not the obstinacy of testimony". She gave speeches on every anniversary of German Surrender at the Consulate of France in Geneva. From 1997 until 2017, she took part in Yom HaShoah. She would also accompany classes of schoolchildren on trips from Geneva to Auschwitz. At the funeral of Geneviève de Gaulle-Anthonioz in 2002, Rouget paid tribute to her on behalf of ADIR in Bossey and the Notre-Dame de Paris. She also paid tribute to other friends, such as Paule de Schoulepnikoff.

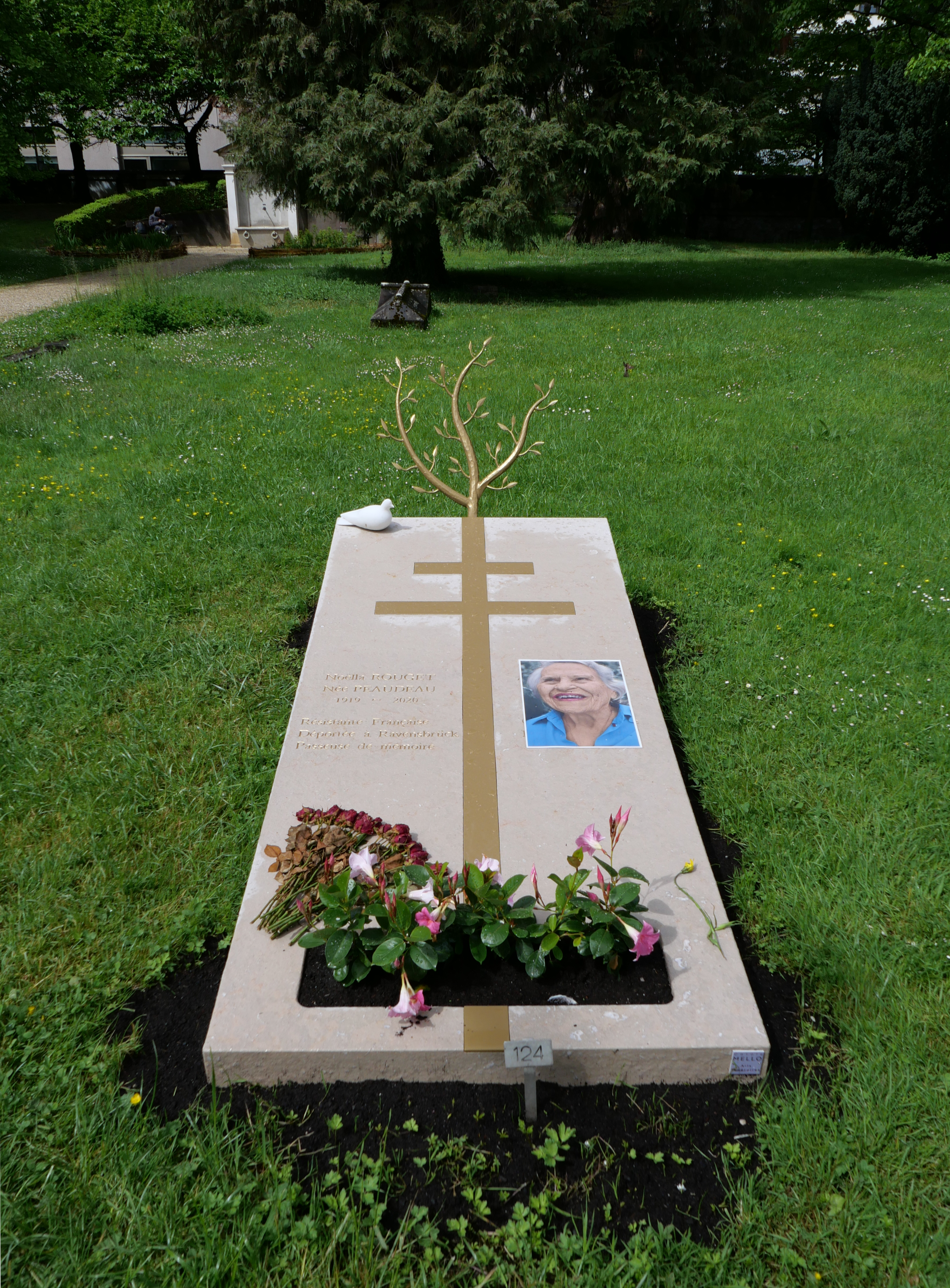
The grave in 2024.

On 14 May 2011, Rouget, along with Marie-José Chombart de Lauwe, Stéphane Hessel, Raymond Aubrac, and Daniel Cordier, signed the Appel de Thorens-Glières, which aimed to republicize the message of the National Council of the Resistance. During a speech at the International School of Geneva in 2013, she said "When I talk to you about the sufferings that we experienced in Ravensbrück, I speak to preach vigilance to the younger generations because if Auschwitz was possible, Auschwitz is possible as long as hatred of others, racism and hatred reign in the world". On 15 June 2016, she unveiled a commemorative plaque in front of the La Gumfluh chalet, where she stayed under the service of ADIR. It honored the people who served there, including Irène Gander-Dubuis, known as Mademoiselle Irène. In a 12 September 2019 Le Monde article, Benoît Hopquin devoted two whole pages to Rouget, highlighting the action she took to save Jacques Vasseur. The article was echoed by France Inter and France 24.

Noëlla Rouget died in Geneva on 22 November 2020, at the age of 100, from COVID-19 during the COVID-19 pandemic in Switzerland. She found her final resting place at the Cimetière des Rois, which is considered the Genevan Panthéon, since burials there are reserved for personalities with extraordinary achievements for the public good. Her grave slab bears the inscription:

« Résistante Française

Déportée à Ravensbrück

Passeuse de mémoire »

== Publications ==
- "Paule de Schoulepnikoff" (1995)
- "Un bouquet en liberté pour notre Présidente" (2002)
- Entre mémoire collective et mémoire familiale : l'héritage d'un trauma collectif lié à la violence totalitaire : étude exploratoire sur la transmission transgénérationnelle… (2006)
- Retour à la vie : l'accueil en Suisse romande d'anciennes déportées françaises de la Résistance, 1945-1947 (2013)
- "Le chemin du retour de Ravensbrück" (2015)
- "Noëlla Rouget, la force du pardon" (2019)

== Decorations ==
- Croix de Guerre 1939–1945 (1946)
- Combatant's Cross
- Grand Cross of the Ordre national du Mérite (2019), presented by Benoît Puga in Geneva on 7 February 2020

== See also ==
- List of prisoners of Ravensbrück
