= Ágnes Bartha =

Hungarian photographer and Holocaust survivor (1922–2018)

Ágnes Galambos Bartha (née Schwartz, 26 October 1922 – 9 May 2018) was a Hungarian photographer and Ravensbrück concentration camp survivor. Together with her friend Edith Kiss she was deported to Ravensbrück in the autumn of 1944 and then transferred to the Daimler-Benz factory at Ludwigsfelde where she was forced to work on aircraft engines for the Luftwaffe. After escaping from a death march in April 1945, she returned with Kiss to Budapest. Since 1992, she talked about her experiences of deportation and concentration camps, taking part in a number of exhibitions and films.

== Biography ==
Born in Dunaföldvár near Budapest on 26 October 1922, Ágnes Schwartz, known as Ági, was brought up in a Jewish family who had not adopted a strictly kosher lifestyle. Thanks to her nanny from Graz in Austria, she became fluent in German. When she was 14, she spent a year in a school in Vienna but returned to Hungary in 1937 as the Nazis became more threatening. Back home, she helped with the family business.

When she was 19, Ági Schwartz married her teenage sweetheart, Layos Galambos, a Roman Catholic. Galambos' parents did everything they could to break up the marriage, finally succeeding in October 1942 when the couple were divorced. Ágnes Galambos moved to Budapest where despite increasing anti-Jewish sentiment, she managed to find a job as an apprentice photographer. After her Jewish employer was deported, she and his assistant continued to run the business. In March 1944, Hungary was occupied by the Germans. The following October, all Jewish women aged between 16 and 40 were forced to assemble at Budapest's central sports ground. There she met Edith Kiss with whom she developed a deep friendship.

After first being subjected to forced labour in Hungary, they were then deported to the Ravensbrück concentration camp. In December, both the women were transferred to the Daimler-Benz factory at Ludwigsfelde where they joined 1,100 women who were forced to assemble aircraft engines for the Luftwaffe in dreadful conditions.

As the end of the war approached, they were sent back to Ravensbrück from where they were sent on a death march for execution in the gas chambers. On 30 April they escaped from the death march at Strasen near Wesenberg. After being raped by Soviet soldiers, they found sanctuary in a shelter. Galambos developed a fever but they found food and medicine in the selter, allowing her to recover over the next six weeks. They then travelled back to Budapest via Berlin, Prague and Bratislava, arriving there on 1 July 1945.

On returning to Budapest, Ágnes spent a month recovering in hospital. She then completed her photography studies. Her friend Edith Kiss committed suicide in a Paris hotel in 1966 after failing to gain recognition in the West for her artwork illustrating her experiences of concentration camps.

In 1992, she met Helmuth Bauer who was researching the role of Daimler Benz in the holocaust. She was finally persuaded to talk about her experiences of deportation and forced labour after years of silence. She was also keen to describe Edith Kiss's contribution to the period, especially through the 30 gouache illustrations of her experiences. Together with Bauer, she took part in many exhibitions and films, documenting the Ravensbrück concentration camp and the Daimler Benz aircraft engine factory.

On 11 July 2012, Ágnes Bartha was awarded the Order of Merit of the Federal Republic of Germany. She died on 9 May 2018, at the age of 95.
