= Josette Molland =

World War II French Resistance member (1923–2024)

Josette Molland (14 May 1923 – 17 February 2024), also known as Josette Molland-Ilinsky, was a painter and member of the French Resistance in World War II.

== Early life and education ==
Molland was born on 14 May 1923 in Bourges. She was raised in Lyon, where her family owned a drugstore.

In 1939, she joined the École nationale supérieure des beaux-arts (School of Fine Arts) in Lyon, despite her parents' disapproval. She set up a painting studio above her family's business.

== World War II ==
Molland was still attending college and had work creating designs for silk weavers when Germany invaded southern France in 1942, prompting her to join the Resistance. Through a connection with a Dutch student, she joined a Resistance group known as the Dutch-Paris network, which was founded by Dutch diplomat Herman Laatsman and France-based industrialist Johan Weidner. In this organization she served as a courier and forged official stamps and documents such as laissez-passers to help refugees and Resistance members travel across borders and escape detection by Nazi officials.

In 1944, a courier was caught with a list of contacts in the network, which officials obtained. In March 1944, the Gestapo raided Molland's home and found the stamps she had been using to forge documents. She told the agents that she had only been using them for drawing practice, but they arrested her and brought her to a military prison nearby, where she was interrogated and tortured by local Gestapo leader Klaus Barbie, who was searching for more members of the network at that time. Mollard was kicked down a flight of stairs during her time at the prison. Her mother, who was unaware of Mollard's Resistance activities, attempted unsuccessfully to convince Barbie to free her daughter.

Mollard was held in Montluc prison for a while, then transferred to Fresnes Prison, where she was interrogated again. She was then moved to the Fort de Romainville concentration camp until 11 August 1944, when she was sent to Ravensbrück concentration camp alongside 102 other women. During a stop at Neue Bremm, she attempted to escape from the transport, but after her attempt failed she was put in chains on the transport and left without food. At Ravensbrück, food was scarce and the prisoners endured many beatings from the guards. To survive, she searched for alternative sources of food, which came to include insects and a mole she found frozen in the earth. Later, she was moved to another camp at Holleischen, where she and the other women were forced to manufacture munitions. She attempted to organize resistance among the prisoners, but the soldiers who ran the camp punished her for this by forcing her to chop wood for hours at a time, with little to no food. She described being beaten with a rubber baton for helping a fellow prisoner who had fainted during roll call. (Note: Prisoners who fainted during roll call were generally killed by the guards.)

Ravensbrück was liberated by Soviet forces in May 1945. The remaining SS officers and camp guards were captured. Mollard, describing the experience, said that guards "whose behaviour had been acceptable" were allowed to go free, and those who had been abusive to the prisoners were shot.

== Post-war life ==
In 1945, after Ravensbrück was liberated and Mollard was recovering from extreme fatigue and hunger, she was repatriated to France and moved to Nice to be with her parents. She was 22 now, and resumed her career as an artist.

She was married twice. Her first husband was a former Polish army officer, with whom she lived in England. Their marriage subsequently ended, and Molland returned to France. She then married Sergei Ilinsky, who was an exiled Russian aristocrat. They both loved painting and worked together to create icons as part of a restoration project for the Russian Orthodox basilica in Nice.

In the 1980s, she created a series of 15 paintings depicting her life and the lives of other women she met in the Nazi concentration camps, and she presented these artworks to students during her talks. They depict scenes such as communal washrooms, beatings of prisoners, collapse of prisoners from overwork, Nazi extraction of nude prisoners' golden teeth and tooth crowns, the liberation of the camp by the Polish military, public body cavity searches, and the collection of the dead when typhus killed many women in the camp in autumn 1944.

Her painting style has been described as "a naïve, folk-art style".

In 2016, she published her autobiography, Soif de Vivre (Thirst for Life), which she wrote with the assistance of historian Roger Dailler and her friend Monique Mosselmans-Melinand. In the book, she said she "had a happy life for the next 50 years" after she left the camp.

Molland died on 17 February 2024 in Falicon, France, at the age of 100. Her funeral was held on 28 February at the Cimiez Monastery in Nice.

== See also ==
- France during World War II
- List of prisoners of Ravensbrück
