= Aat Breur-Hibma =

Dutch drafter and painter (1913–2002)

- Born: Adriana Klazina Hibma; 28 December 1913; The Hague, Netherlands
- Died: 31 December 2002 (aged 89); Amsterdam, Netherlands
- Education: Academy of Visual Arts
- Occupations: Drafter; painter
- Spouse: Krijn Breur (m. 1940; died 1943)
- Children: 2

Adriana Klazina "Aat" Breur-Hibma (née Hibma: 28 December 1913 – 31 December 2002) was a Dutch draftswoman and painter. During World War II, she entered the Dutch resistance and ended up as a Nacht und Nebel prisoner in Ravensbrück. There she made poignant pencil drawings of fellow prisoners that are preserved at the Rijksmuseum in Amsterdam. She was recognised as Righteous Among the Nations in 1995.

== Early life and family ==
Breur-Hibma was born Adriana Klazina Hibma on 28 December 1913 in The Hague to Pieter Hibma (1877–1956), a Frisian cobbler, and Adriana Klazina Tize (born 1879), a needlework teacher. The youngest of two sisters, Breur-Hibma's parents allowed her study at the Academy of Visual Arts on the condition that she got her teaching certificate. Whilst studying Breur-Hibma began engaging with socialist and communist movements.

On 18 September 1940, Breur-Hibma married the philosophy student Krijn Breur. Because of her marriage, in accordance with the regulations at the time, Aat lost her job as a drawing teacher. Her husband was a fervent communist that fought as a volunteer in the Spanish Civil War against Franco and he was therefore stateless. As a result, the couple was not entitled to a benefit. The couple had two children, a son in December 1940, and a daughter, Dunya Breur, in 1942.

== World War II ==
Since the beginning of the war, the couple was very active in the Dutch resistance: Krijn with attacks, his wife with the falsification of identity cards. Both contributed to the newspaper of the Communist Party of the Netherlands "De Waarheid" originated in 1940 under the German occupation as a resistance paper. They took Jewish people in hiding but were finally betrayed. On 19 November 1942 they are arrested together with two Jewish people in hiding. Krijn was tortured, sentenced to death and executed in February 1943.

== Nacht und Nebel in Ravensbrück ==
Aat entered in the Scheveningen prison with her baby Dunya, then was taken to isolation in Utrecht. Before being deported in June 1943, she succeeded in giving Dunya to her parents at the prison gate. After a time in the Kleve and Berlin prisons, she arrived in the women's Ravensbrück concentration camp in September 1943. There she underwent the strict regime for the Nacht und Nebel prisoners.

She was initially assigned to a road construction work force, one of the hardest forms of forced labor, but thanks to some well-meaning guardians and her skills as a draftswoman, she managed to work in the bookbindery and signed birth announcements. In this way she got access to leftovers of paper for her clandestine drawings. Aat's drawings mainly depicted her fellow sufferers.

On 1 March 1945, Aat was transferred to the "Strafblock", equivalent to a death sentence. However a doctor pulled her out of the row and pinned on her the number of a deceased prisoner. This was her salvation. After the camp commander heard that two Dutch women had made drawings, which was regarded as high treason, fellow prisoners hid the drawings before the camp commander came to look for them. These portraits of prisoners and other drawings were rescued after the liberation of the concentration camp and later made public along with the release of her memoir as a book "I live because you remember!".

On 29 April 1945, the Russian army liberated the Ravensbrück camp. On July 6, 1945, Aat is repatriated severely ill with tuberculosis. She spent the following eight years largely in hospitals and sanatoriums. In 1998, in an interview for a documentary by Loretta Walz, she spoke publicly for the first time about her time in Ravensbrück.

== Publication of her drawings ==
In September 1945, Aat was visited by a fellow prisoner who managed to salvage her drawings from the camp. Aat hid the damaged drawings as she did not want to think about it anymore. She had problems with her health and suffered from camp trauma. She led a very withdrawn existence and the period of the war was like a taboo for her. Her children suffered greatly from this.

It is ultimately her daughter Dunya Breur (1942–2009), who studied Slavic languages and worked as a translator and publicist, who managed to break her silence. She asked many times about the contents of a secret suitcase under her mother's bed. Only in 1980 the drawings came out of the suitcase and the memories of the camp came up. Her drawings were given to the Rijksmuseum Amsterdam (Rijksprentenkabinet), restored and featured in several exhibitions.

== Book and documentary ==
Dunya was deeply touched by the story of her mother. She visited Ravensbrück, conducted extensive archival research and searched for the still-living portrayed women in France, Belgium, Sweden and the Netherlands and let them tell their story. She published in 1983 the drawings of Aat together with those stories in the book "De verborgen herinnering" (A hidden memory). It has become a historical document about the Ravensbrück women's concentration camp, with many details about the gruesome camp life.

Aat Breur-Hibma continued her withdrawn life as a drawing and painting teacher. After the publication of her drawings, she only interrupted her silence with an interview in the documentary "Verleden aanwezig" (Past Present) in 1994, in which five women of Ravensbrück were interviewed: Ceija Stoijka (Austria), Lidia Rolfi (Italy), Aat Breur-Hibma (Netherlands), Stella Kugelman Griez (Russia), Antonina Nikiforova (Russia).

== Awards ==
In 1989, Aat and Dunya Breur received the honorary medal from the Stichting Kunstenaarsverzet 1942–1945, especially for her book. On 5 March 1998, Krijn Breur (posthumously) and Aat Breur-Hibma were recognised as Righteous Among the Nations by the Yad Vashem.
