= Elisabeth Jäger =

Austrian journalist (1924–2019)

Elisabeth "Lisl" Jäger
- Born: Leopoldine Elisabeth "Lisl" Morawitz; 25 September 1924; Vienna, Austria
- Died: 28 June 2019 (aged 94)
- Occupation: Journalist
- Known for: Anti-Nazi resistance activism Concentration camp survival
- Spouse: Max Bair (1917–2000) who in 1949/50 changed his name to Martin Jäger
- Children: 1. Brigitta; 2. Claudia
- Parent(s): August Morawitz (?–1941); Leopoldine

Elisabeth Jäger (née Morawitz; 25 September 1924 – 28 June 2019) was an Austrian journalist, based from 1950 in the German Democratic Republic (East Germany). She was a committed anti-fascist and a survivor of the Ravensbrück concentration camp.

== Provenance and early years ==
Leopoldine Elisabeth "Lisl" Morawitz was born into a conventionally catholic family in Vienna, the youngest of her parents' four children. August Morawitz, her father, worked on the market ("der Naschmarkt"). Her mother, Leopoldine Morawitz, is identified as a housewife. Lisl attended school locally between 1930 and 1938 and then went on to embark on a commercial apprenticeship at an office supplies shop. Illegal political activities in which she was engaged used up a lot of paper and paint, and it was later reported that she had stolen significant quantities of supplies. "The owner did not bother with the business anyhow."

== Political activism under the Nazi régime ==
On 12 March 1938 Austria was incorporated into Nazi Germany. Although this involved German troops marching into Austria, there were many across much of the political spectrum who welcomed the development, both for historical reasons and because Austria's economic performance had been dire for many years, whereas Chancellor Hitler appeared to have found a way, at least in Germany, to beat the ongoing run-off from the Great Depression. News reports distributed and viewed round the world showed Austrians greeting the columns of German troops with flowers. Morawitz had grown up in the Social Democratic milieu of the city's working class quarters, however, and within the family there was little sympathy with the fashion for populist extremism. Lisl was a member of the Young Communists and now found herself pitched into resistance activism by what had become a one-party dictatorship.

Activities included supporting imprisoned Communists and their left-behind dependent family members. She helped to create an information network and was able on at least one occasion to warn vulnerable comrades such as Ernst Goldblum, a Jewish friend of her elder sister, about an impending raid by Nazi paramilitaries. She and her siblings made themselves available to escort "illegals" from the station to apartments where they might hide: typically that involved people living without having registered their residence at a town hall because they were keen to avoid being located by the authorities, generally for reasons of politics and / or race. She collected money for the Soviet sponsored "Red Aid" communist welfare organisation. She also joined her brothers on leafleting tours round the district, in a campaign reminiscent of the White Rose movement in Munich. They would make their way to the square where trams parked up overnight and, early in the morning, climb up and place piles of political leaflets on the roofs of the trams. The leaflets would then be slowly distributed by the wind as the trams moved off. As the children became bolder they took to sneaking up behind people in the street and slipping leaflets into their back pockets or open-topped bags. Sometimes they were spotted at the last minute by Nazi thugs and Gestapo, but she was "a natural gymnast and quick". And she "knew the Vienna alleys and cellars". ("Ich war schnell, Turnerin, und kannte die Wiener Gassen und Keller".

It was not just the Morawitz children who backed the anti-fascist resistance. August Morawitz, Elisabeth's father, hid the duplicating machine they used for preparing their leaflets; and she later found out that her mother, too, had been collecting money for "Red Aid" and, indeed, making their apartment available for "illegal meetings". However, August Morawitz died in March 1941.

== Arrest, interrogation and trial ==
Sources differ as to whether Lisl Morawitz was arrested by the Gestapo on 3 July 1941 or 2 August 1941. She was arrested at work, and when she was taken to the Gestapo station she came across her mother who had also been arrested. She discovered much later, having been able to research the matter, that her mother had been "even more active" in the resistance movement than she had been, but when the arrests took place she was evidently, like the Gestapo, unaware of the extent of her mother's involvement. Mother and daughter shared the first name "Leopoldine, and there was talk of her mother having been arrested in error. Neither woman was released, however.

When she was 90 Elisabeth Jäger's memories of her interrogation sessions with the Gestapo as a 16 year old disclose the unencumbered joy of the survivor.

- "The Gestapo were thoroughly unfriendly, I thought, chucking me out of the window and beating me up during the interrogations".
- "Die Gestapo war recht unfreundlich, ich dachte, die schmeißen mich aus dem Fenster, die haben mich verprügelt bei den Verhören."

At the Gestapo centre she underwent a series of interrogation sessions after which she was taken into investigative custody. In a gesture of solidarity which she would always recall with pleasure, her cell-mate's aunt, who was a professional dress maker from Hamburg, made her a beautiful dress for her court appearance. She only saw the aunt for the first time on the day when the trial opened, but evidently the dress fitted. The charge was a familiar one: "Preparing high treason and undermining military strength" ("Vorbereitung zum Hochverrat und Wehrkraftzersetzung"). Her membership of the (by now illegal) Young Communists was a particular issue for the authorities. She was sentenced to a three years jail term. Her mother, presumably convicted on the basis of similar charges, received a four year jail term,.

== Prison ==
Following conviction Lisl Morawitz and her brother Bruno were sent to the Stadelheim Street Penitentiary in Munich. Their mother was sent to a prison at Aichach, also in Bavaria. In Munich she was allocated to a gang of women workers and sent to work each day at a former Agfa factory which had been converted to produce munitions for the war which had broken out in September 1939. As was usual under these circumstances, they worked without wages. Morawitz teamed up with "Sepp ... whose brother was being held in Dachau" and "Anni ... whose fiance was classified as half-Jewish, as a result of which the two of them were not permitted to marry" to form a little illegal activist cell. They were working alongside civilians who had been conscripted to work in the munitions plant, so were not completely isolated from the world outside. The work, which was intricate and in which she became highly proficient, involved assembling bullets for use in aircraft mounted guns. Cell members assembled the bullets so that a few of the bullets would be unusable. The "tip" on what to do came from "outside". They always placed the "bad bullet" in a different position when packing the bullets into their boxes, and the potentially very risky acts of sabotage went undiscovered.

Bruno Morawitz, Lisl's brother, faced further charges. He was convicted by the special "People's Court" on 23 September and was condemned to death. He was killed by guillotine in Vienna on 25 February 1944. He was 21.

== Ravensbrück ==
Lisl's own prison term came to an end in September 1943. However, the war was no longer going well and the authorities were becoming ever more concerned about political dissidents on the home front. Still aged only 17, she was on the receiving end of a "Protective Custody Order", by which she was identified as one of the "Unimprovables" ("Unverbesserliche") and deported to the Women's Concentration Camp at Ravensbrück, a short distance to the north of Berlin. Fellow inmates, she recalled in an interview many decades later, included "criminals, lesbians, political detainees and the so-called 'work-shy'". The train took them not to the village station but to a nearby rail depot from where they were marched the final few kilometers to the camp. At the concentration camp she was reunited with people she had known inside the prison in Vienna when she was first arrested back in 1941, including one called "Friedel Sedlacek" who had heard of her impending arrival "on the grapevine" even before Lisl's reached the camp, and who was able to warn her against "asocial" inmates next to whom she should avoid falling asleep. Her first work at Ravensbrück involved shovelling sand. It was heavy work which she would not have been expected to survive for long, but by this time the guards, increasingly demoralised by the anticipated military defeat of the Nazi state, had transferred much of the daily administration of the camp to trusted inmates. Friends saw to it that she was transferred to "administrative" work. She fell ill with typhoid in March 1945 but recovered. Many did not.

Despite the overwhelming inhumanity of the situation at Ravensbrück, glimmers of something better occasionally turned up. On 24 December 1944 the inmates organised a Christmas party for the children. Children from birth up to the age of 12 were normally kept in concentration camps with their mothers, and there were several hundred at Ravensbrück. Tables were covered in white cloth and sandwiches - one per child - prepared. The camp guards joined in the preparations. There were toys for the children. Some of the women had got hold of materials to make dolls. Lisl made a "Kasperle" doll. Suddenly she heard a guard behind her, and was overcome with a sense of dread over what would follow. But Mr Bunte, the guard, asked simply, "Would you make a doll like that for me?". She did not want to, but fellow inmates persuaded her to relent: "Just make that doll for him, and if necessary make him two dolls". The prisoner made a doll for the guard and a few days later she received an apple by way of thanks. Many years later Mr.Bunte's past evidently caught up with him and he made contact again, asking that she should testify that he had sent her an apple. "So conditions cannot have been as bad as all that", was the message he was hoping to infer from the incident. Thinking back, even to the Christmas party, would be hard, in later years: not many of the children survived their time in the camp.

As the Soviet forces drew near from the east there was a desperate scramble to clear the concentration camps. On 28 April 1945, Ravensbrück was evacuated. The inmates were sent out on a Death March towards the west. Their paramilitary guards grew careless or themselves ran away: Lisl was able to escape with two comrades and hide out in the forest for three days and three nights. As the war ended, at the start of May 1945 Ravensbrück was liberated by the Red army and Lisl returned to help look after survivors who had been too sick to be sent out from the camp earlier.

At the beginning of July 1945 Lisl Morawitz returned home to Vienna. The political situation was unstable and unpredictable, but over the next few years the country was divided into four military zones of occupation. The area surrounding Vienna comprised the Soviet occupation zone, although the city itself was separately divided, with roughly 60% under Soviet occupation and smaller occupation zones administered by US, British and French occupation forces. The defining backdrop was one of austerity leading, on occasion, to acute hunger, as supplies were diverted from the Soviet zone to the Soviet Union. Sources are largely silent about Lisl Morawitz's activities during this time, but in or before 1950 she married Max Bair.

== Max Bair alias Martin Jäger ==
Max Bair was a "farm boy" from the Tirol ("ein Tiroler Bauernbub"). His mother died when he was 3: his father died when he was 16. In 1937, after selling the three cows he had acquired when he inherited the heavily indebted family farm in 1935, he paid off the creditors and left to fight against the Francoists in the Spanish Civil War. He had spent most of the subsequent war years in the Soviet Union, but in October 1944 the Soviets conveyed him to Slovenia where he commanded the first battalion the Austrian Independence Movement. After the liberation of Innsbruck he made his way to the Tirol as regional first secretary of the Austrian Communist Party. However, his friends from ten years earlier were mostly disappeared or dead. The Red army was widely blamed for blocking food supplies and reports of a sustained plague of rapes by Soviet soldiers in occupied Vienna meant that there was very little support for the communists in the Tirol, as election results in November 1945 confirmed. Seeing no future for himself in his homeland Bair sold the family farm for 35,000 Schillings and moved to the Soviet occupation zone in Vienna to complete his schooling. He remained politically engaged and in April 1949, at this point using the name "Josef Maier", he was arrested in Salzburg by the US intelligence services. Suspected of involvement in deporting civilian workers to the Soviet zone, he was detained in a secret location. However, Bair retained some level of public profile, since his Spanish Civil War experiences had caught the imagination of the journalist-write Egon Kisch who had written about him in a short biographical volume under the title "Die drei Kühe" ("The three cows"): the first edition, back in 1938, had run to 10,000 copies. Twelve years later he managed to smuggle out a message from his secret place of incarceration, and with the help of comrades to trigger a media storm, following which in March 1950 he was released "on bail" by the Americans (but without ever having undergone a trial), after eleven months.

To the north, most of Germany had also been divided into military zones of occupation. It appeared that the Soviets had given very much more attention to planning for this outcome in Germany, and although not everything had gone to plan, in October 1949 the region administered as the Soviet occupation zone in Germany had been relaunched as the Soviet sponsored German Democratic Republic (East Germany). In 1950 Max Bair changed his name to Martin Jäger, and with his new wife, Elisabeth relocated to the German Democratic Republic where they would build a new life together.

== A new life in a new Germany ==
Recent interviews make it clear that Jäger is content with her life in Berlin, but she has not forgotten Vienna, and memories of Ravensbrück are not fully expunged. Interviewed following a lively celebration of her ninetieth birthday she still - possibly jokingly - identified the Germans as "Piefke", an unflattering (and not easily translatable) Austrian term for the northern neighbours.

- "Life in the German Democratic Republic was sometimes tiresome, but that had nothing to do with the German Democratic Republic: they were just Germans".
- "Das Leben in der DDR war unsympathisch, das hatte aber nichts mit der DDR zu tun, das waren halt Deutsche."

Like her husband, Elisabeth Jäger had survived the war without ever having completed her schooling. In the German Democratic Republic she now studied for and passed her German School final exams (Abitur). She then enrolled at Leipzig University where she graduated successfully from what as becoming the university's well regarded Faculty of Journalism. During this period the couple's daughters, Brigitta and Claudia, were born in 1951 and 1954. During the years that followed she worked for the East German radio service, for various newspaper publishing houses, and at the Ministry for Culture and the Arts. Her work placed her in a position of some privilege. Unlike most of her fellow citizens she was able to travel abroad, visiting Cuba, Cyprus, Finland and, much more frequently and usually accompanied by her husband, Austria.

Since the 1950s Lisl Jäger has involved herself with the "Lagergemeinschaft Ravensbrück" ("Ravensbrück Camp Association"). In presentations to school children and young people she testifies to her own experiences and warns against the consequences of right-wing extremism, fascism and totalitarianism.

== Personal life ==
Martin Jäger died in 2000. Elisabeth Jäger had two daughters, as well as grandchildren and great grandchildren. She died in June 2019 at the age of 94.

== Honours ==
On 13 June 2008 Minister-President Platzeck conferred on Elisabeth Jäger the Order of Merit of Brandenburg in recognition of her consistent public opposition to political amnesia in respect of the twentieth century dictatorships.
