= Edith Kiss =

Hungarian sculptor and painter (1905–1966)

Edith Bán Kiss
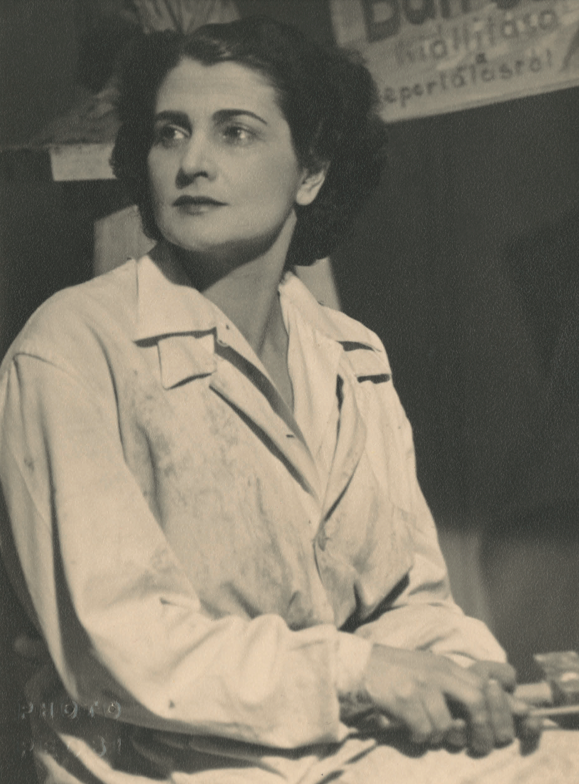
- Born: Edith Bán Rott; 1905; Budapest, Hungary
- Died: 27 October 1966 (aged 60–61); Paris, France
- Known for: Painting, sculpture

Edith Bán Kiss (also Edit, née Rott 1905 – 27 October 1966) was a Hungarian sculptor and painter. In the autumn of 1944, she was deported to the Ravensbrück concentration camp in northern Germany and then transferred to the Daimler-Benz factory at Ludwigsfelde where she was forced to work on aircraft engines for the Luftwaffe. Shortly after her release at the end of the war, she illustrated her experiences of concentration camps with 30 gouache sketches which were exhibited in Budapest in late 1945. There was however little recognition of her work in the West. As a result, following the death of her husband she committed suicide in Paris in 1966. In 1992, her Deportation series was exhibited in Berlin, Paris and Budapest.

== Biography ==
Born into a Jewish family in Budapest on 21 November 1905, Edith Kiss was the youngest of the four daughters of Friges and Melitta Rott. Having studied at the art academies in Budapest and Düsseldorf, she became a sculptor in Hungary in the period before World War II. Around that time, she married Tivadar Bán.

In October 1944, together with thousands of other Jewish women in Hungary, Kiss was subjected to forced labour and then deported to the Ravensbrück concentration camp in northern Germany. On 6 December 1944, she was transferred to the Daimler-Benz factory at Ludwigsfelde where 1,100 women were forced to work on aircraft engines for the Luftwaffe.

As the end of the war approached, Kiss was returned to Ravensbrück from where she was sent on a death march by the Nazis. With her friend Agnes Rezsone Bartha, she escaped at Strasen near Wesenbergon 30 April. They travelled back to Budapest via Berlin, Prague and Bratislava, arriving there on 1 July 1945.

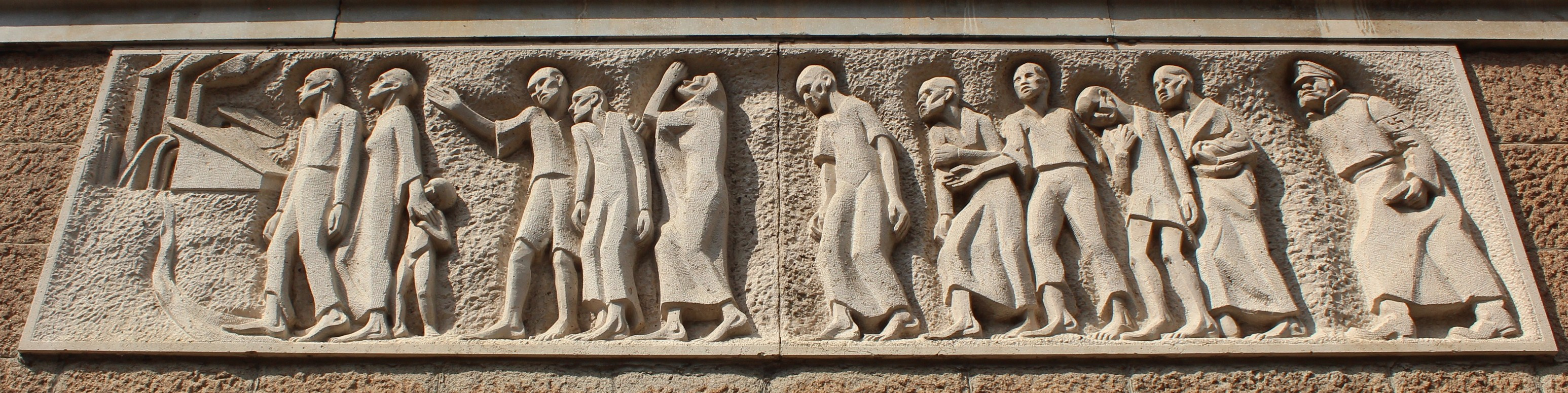
Kiss's relief of Jews being sent to the gas chambers

On returning to Budapest, Kiss illustrated her concentration camp experiences in a series of 30 gouache sketches titled Deportation which she exhibited in the city on 22 September 1945. After divorcing her first husband, she married Sándor Kiss and emigrated to the West with him. Shortly after their departure, in July 1948 the four large stone reliefs of the deportation she had created were set in the outer wall of Budapest's Újpest Synagogue. One relief shows a Hungarian policeman directing Jews to cattle trucks for deportation, a second shows an Arrow Cross Party guard overseeing men in a labour battalion, a third presents a Nazi guard herding Jews into the gas chambers and the fourth shows Red Army soldiers being welcomed by Jews in Budapest.

Despite further works reflecting her deportation experiences, there was little public recognition of Kiss's art. After periods spent in Switzerland, Casablanca and London, and the death of her husband, she committed suicide in a Paris hotel on the night of 26–27 October 1966. Her gouache album was rediscovered by Helmuth Bauer in London in 1992 and her gouaches have since been exhibited in various locations in Germany and in Paris and Budapest. They have also been presented in the We were Nobody exhibition at the Ravensbrück Memorial.
