= Cilly Schäfer =

German politician (1898–1981)

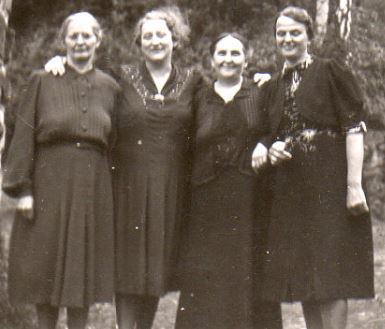
- Cilly Schäfer (2nd from left)
- Born: Cäcilie Barbara Tannenberg; 25 January 1898; Friedberg, Hesse, Germany
- Died: 18 January 1981 (aged 82); Marburg, Hesse, West Germany
- Occupations: Activist & politician
- Political party: USPD; Communist Party of Germany
- Spouse: Jakob Schaefer
- Parent(s): Friedrich August Gustav Tannenberg; Elisa (née Klein)

Cäcilie "Cilly" Schäfer (born Cäcilie Tannenberg: 25 January 1898 - 18 January 1981) was a German politician (Communist Party of Germany). During the twelve Nazi years her political activities became illegal and she spent much of the time in state detention, which she survived.

== Life ==
Cäcilie "Cilly" Barbara Tannenberg was born in Friedberg, a small manufacturing town north of Frankfurt. Her father, Friedrich August Gustav Tannenberg, was a shoe maker. There were four siblings. After leaving school she trained and qualified for work in the garment industry. Influenced by the impact of the war, in October 1918 she became an organiser locally with the Young Socialists. In 1920 she joined the Independent Social Democratic Party ("Unabhängige Sozialdemokratische Partei Deutschlands" / USPD) which had broken away from the mainstream Social Democratic Party the previous year, primarily over disagreements on whether or not to support funding for the war. At the end of 1920 the USPD itself split apart, and Cilly Tannenberg was part of the majority faction that now joined the newly formed German Communist Party.

In Friedberg, on 25 June 1921 she married Jakob Schäfer whom originally she had met through their membership of Friends of Nature organisation. He was a master tailor and, as a German Communist Party member, a local councillor in Bad Nauheim. The two of them moved to Bad Nauheim and Cilly became an honorary (unpaid) Communist Party official, while the two of them worked together in the tailoring business. Later, in 1927, Jakob Schäfer became a member of the regional legislature ("Hessische Landtag"). Cilly Schäfer herself was elected a member of the Landtag in 1931.

In January 1933 the political backdrop was transformed when the Nazi Party took power and converted Germany into a one-party dictatorship. Political activity - except in support of the Nazi Party - became illegal. At the end of February 1933 the Reichstag fire was instantly blamed on the Communists, and in March 1933 those identified as Communists began to be arrested. Cilly Schäfer was arrested on 13 March 1933 in Bad Nauheim. On 5 April a special court in Darmstadt sentenced her to a year in prison. Her husband was taken into "protective custody" in June 1933 and spent time inside Osthofen Concentration Camp. They were both released in the summer of 1934 and relocated to Marburg where they were able to support themselves through tailoring. Cilly Schäfer continued to be involved in low level resistance activity, distributing the now illegal Communist Party newspaper, Die Rote Fahne ("The Red Flag") and using the subversive "Red Front" greeting when meeting comrades in the street. It is known that for several weeks in 1935 she was held in "protective custody". In 1940 a birthday party was held at the Schäfers' Marburg home which was no party, but a meeting (by definition illegal) of Communist Party officials.

The attempt to assassinate Hitler on 20 July 1944 failed in its primary objective, but it did greatly unsettle the Nazi leadership. Some years earlier the Nazis had compiled a list of communist and socialist politicians and activists from the Weimar years who might be rounded up in the event of a deterioration in the domestic political situation. By 1944 the list was somewhat out of date, many of those named on it having already been murdered or died from natural causes, but Jakob and Cilly, whose names were also on the list, were very much alive: overnight on the third weekend in August they were arrested and taken, in the first instance, to Ravensbrück concentration camp. Cilly was subsequently moved to Sachsenhausen concentration camp and set to work in a munitions factory. A different emphasis comes from another source which states that in April 1945 she was one of a group of concentration camp inmates sent on one of the notorious death marches. She managed to escape back home to Hesse. By early May 1945 Nazi Germany was over: Cilly and Jakob Schäfer now settled back in Marburg which was being administered as part of the US occupation zone.

In Marburg she worked in the all-party Women's Committee, one of the first public associations to be approved by the US military authorities. The organisation concerned itself with practical reconstruction and the distribution of food parcels to the destitute. She also led a sewing workshop in one of the city schools and became a volunteer official of the no longer illegal Communist Party. By May 1949 basic democratic structures had been restored and the US occupation zone, merged with the British and French occupation zones, was relaunched as the US sponsored German Federal Republic (West Germany): in 1951 Cilly Schäfer and her husband were both voted on to the local council ("Marburger Stadtparlament"). She was also a founder member of the Marburg branch and an active participant in the Union of Persecutees of the Nazi Regime ("Vereinigung der Verfolgten des Naziregimes" / VVN).

During the 1950s, partly in response to economic success in West Germany and partly as a reaction to the increasingly confrontational approach taken by the authorities in the former Soviet occupation zone, which had been reinvented in 1949 as the German Democratic Republic (East Germany), support for the Communist Party fell away dramatically in West Germany: in August 1956 it was banned by the West German Constitutional Court. In 1968 it was reconstituted and relaunched, now identified as the German Communist Party ("Deutsche Kommunistische Partei" / DKP). It never regained the levels of support that the former communist party had enjoyed across Germany before 1933, but in 1968 Cilly and Jakob Schäfer were among the first to sign up to the "new" German Communist Party.

Cilly Schäfer was widowed in 1971. She herself died in Marburg on 18 January 1981, one week short of what would have been her 83rd birthday. In 1988 the house where she had lived with her husband, officially known at the time as the "Jakob-Schäfer-Haus", was renamed as the "Cilly-und-Jakob-Schäfer-Haus". A street was named after her. All this appears to have come about because, among opinion formers in the city, an exhibition focusing on women in the Landtag (regional legislature) increased awareness of Cilly Schäfer's contribution.
