= Krystyna Zaorska =

Krystyna Zaorska is a Polish artist and woman activist.

== Life and career ==
Zaorska was 14 when she was arrested with her mother, Henryka, in the raids following the Warsaw Uprising in 1944. She was taken to Ravensbrück concentration camp in October 1944, where she was separated from her mother. Her mother was sent to Chojna, where there was a Ravensbrück sub camp. Meanwhile, at Ravensbrück, Krystyna Zaorska was given the prisoner number 76,933. She became seriously ill and was cared for by Polish prisoners. She lived in Block 20 with other young people who did not have to work. In the 2015 documentary "Because I was a Painter," she tells filmmakers, “I was not an artist. I was a child." She says making portraits of the girls in her barracks kept her occupied, and it was a way to entertain others. In her drawings, she drew her bunkmates in better times — wearing school uniforms or dance costumes, or cradling a beloved pet. In February 1945, her mother arrived at Ravensbrück and they were transferred together to the Wiehen Hills, near Vennebeck (today known as Porta-Westfalica), where Krystyna's mother died on March 26, 1945, of exhaustion. Krystyna buried her by herself in the local cemetery. After her liberation by the US Army, Krystyna stayed in a parachute settlement (or Displaced Persons Camp) near Emmerich. She finally returned to the house that her parents built in Gdynia, where she still lives, in 1946. She studied sculpture and ceramics at the University of Fine Arts in Gdańsk. In 1955 she married Tytus Burczyk, a musician, and together they have three children and five grandchildren.

As of 2010, Krystyna was still giving talks to young people in Germany and Poland about her experience. Many of her drawings are presented in the exhibition "The Ravensbrück Women's Concentration Camp: History and Memory" and she appears in the 2015 documentary "Because I was a Painter."
