= Industriewerke Ludwigsfelde =

Automotive factory in Germany

- Traded as: Daimler-Benz (1936–45); IWL (1955–65); IFA (1966–90); Mercedes-Benz (1991–present)
- Industry: engine and vehicle manufacture
- Founded: 1936
- Headquarters: Ludwigsfelde, Germany
- Parent: Daimler-Benz (1936–45); IFA (1955–90); Treuhandanstalt (1990–94); Daimler-Benz (1994–98); Daimler AG (1998–present)

Industriewerke Ludwigsfelde is an automotive factory in Ludwigsfelde in Brandenburg, just south of Berlin in Germany. The factory is part of Daimler AG and since 1991 it has made Mercedes-Benz vans. It is also the producer of the Multicar line of vehicles.

== Supplier of aero engines for the Luftwaffe ==
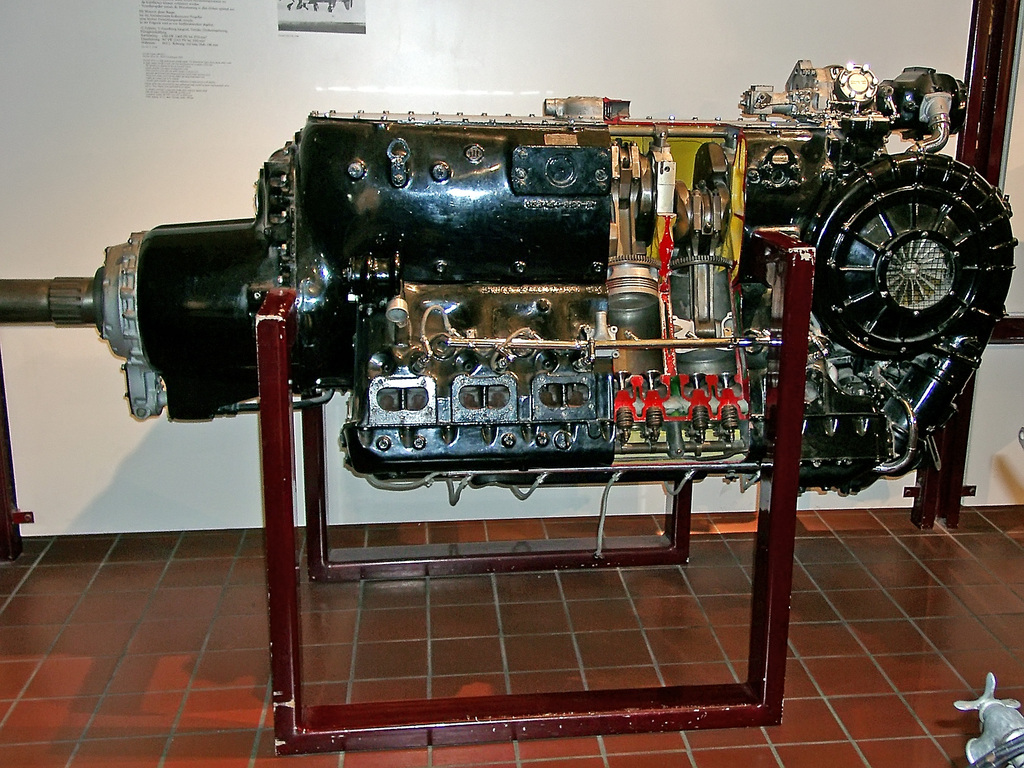
Daimler-Benz DB 603 engine, partly sectioned to show internal working.

The Daimler-Benz company established the Ludwigsfelde factory in 1936 to make DB 600 aero engines for new Luftwaffe bomber- and fighter-aircraft. In the course of German re-armament and the Second World War the factory went on to make Daimler-Benz DB 601, DB 603 and DB 605 engines for various Luftwaffe aircraft.

During the Second World War (1939–1945) the factory used at least 10,000 prisoners of war, forced labourers and concentration-camp prisoners to work in the factory. From 1943 to 1944 it used the forced labour of about 1,100 women prisoners from the Ravensbrück concentration camp north of Berlin. Ludwigsfelde lies at least 60 miles (97 km) from Ravensbrück, so the forced labourers were housed near the factory in a subsidiary concentration camp called the Deutschlandhalle.

Early in 1945 the United States Army Air Forces bombed the factory. Then, after the surrender of Germany in May 1945, what remained of the works was dismantled and taken to the Soviet Union as part of the Allies' programme to take reparations from Germany and reduce German industrial capacity.

== Post-war recovery ==
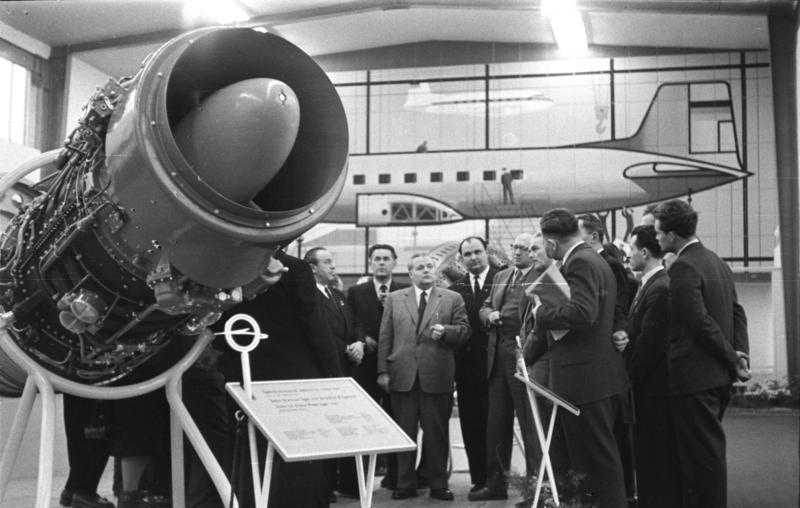
Pirna 014 jet engine at the Spring Leipzig Trade Fair in March 1958

Brandenburg was part of the Sowjetische Besatzungszone (SBZ or Soviet occupation zone) from 1945 and the Deutsche Demokratische Republik (DDR or German Democratic Republic) from 1949. The Volkseigener Betrieb Industriewerke Ludwigsfelde was founded on 1 March 1952. Initially it made marine diesel engines, machine tools and machine elements. Assembly of Multicar M21 Diesel-Ameise ("diesel ant") vehicles was transferred to Ludwigsfelde from the Schmiedewerk Roßwein ("Roßwein Forge Works") in Saxony. In 1953 IWL became involved in the development of motor scooters, which entered production in 1954.

In 1958 IWL began production of drop forging, precision-casting, jet engines, agricultural machinery and one-off special machinery. The jets were 32.3 kN (7,300 lb_{f}) Pirna 014 engines for the Dresden 152 airliner, whose first prototype made its first test flight in December 1958. In 1960 VEB Flugzeuge Dresden was building 20 aircraft to enter service with Deutsche Lufthansa der DDR (which in 1963 became Interflug), for which IWL had begun series production of the Pirna 014.

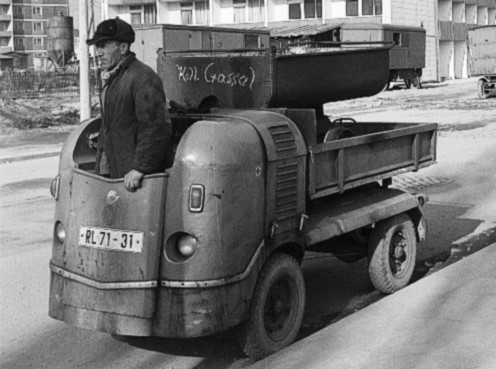
Multicar M21 being used in the rebuilding of Leninplatz, Dresden in about 1966, photographed by Richard Peter.

However, the first 152 prototype crashed in March 1959 killing its crew, and the second prototype was grounded after a fuel tank malfunction caused a dangerous reduction in fuel supply to the engines. During ground testing in September 1960 the third prototype also suffered a fuel tank fault, and its ground tests were ended in December. In February 1961 the SED Politbüro decided to terminate aircraft production, which brought Pirna 014 production to an end at IWL. One engine was tested on an Ilyushin Il-28 aircraft until June 1961 but this did not lead to the Pirna 014's further use or production. In about mid-1961 all Dresden 152 aircraft were scrapped.

Cancellation of the 152 left IWL with 30 completed jet engines and a gap in planned industrial production. The engines were later used to power minesweepers for the Volksmarine.

== IWL motor scooters ==
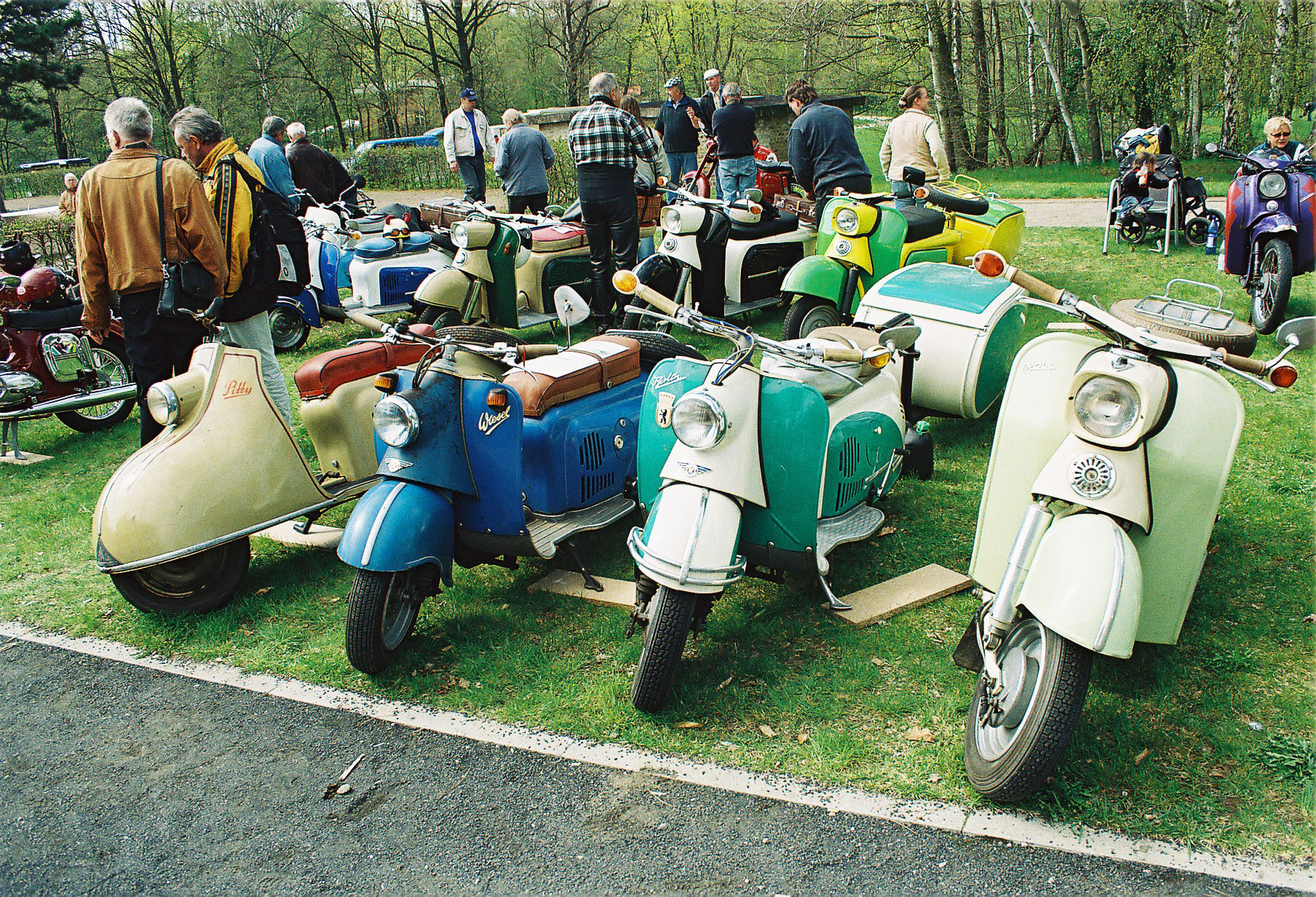
A complete sequence of IWL motor scooter models in historical order. From left to right: Pitty, SR 56 Wiesel, SR 59 Berlin and TR 150 Troll 1.

After the Second World War, various manufacturers — and particularly aircraft and aircraft components makers — diversified into other products including motor scooters. In Italy, Piaggio launched the Vespa in 1946 closely followed by Innocenti's launch of the Lambretta in 1947. The new scooters found a market among customers who could not obtain or could not afford a car but wanted a machine that was cleaner, simpler and gave more weather protection than a motorcycle. Both Piaggio and Innocenti fitted specially designed engines mounted on one side of the rear wheel, which kept the wheelbase short and maximised urban maneuverability. A bulbous rear enclosure kept the engine enclosed, which made a scooter cleaner than most motorcycles of the period. The use of aircraft industry techniques, combined with more stylish appearance made Italian scooters commercially successful, and Innocenti and Piaggio both exported large numbers of their scooters and licensed manufacturers in the Bundesrepublik Deutschland (BRD or West Germany) and other countries to make them.

Numerous European manufacturers who were not licensed to build Italian-designed scooters, developed their own models in an attempt to compete. In 1951 the automotive manufacturer Hans Glas in Bavaria launched his own design of scooter, the Goggo, initially with a 123 cc engine but from 1953 with more powerful 147 cc and 198 cc engines. In 1953 the West German aircraft maker Heinkel launched the Tourist, initially with a 149 cc engine but from 1954 enlarged to 174 cc. However, West German designers tended to use conventional motorcycle-type engines which were not small or light enough to fit beside the rear wheel. They were therefore mounted in front of the rear wheel, which significantly lengthened the scooters' wheelbase.

East German engineers responded to the growing market and competition by developing a number of prototype scooters between 1950 and 1954. August Falz of Döbeln in Saxony had built a primitive motor scooter in 1950, and by 1954 had developed a prototype with streamlined bodywork and powered by a 174 cc ČZ engine imported from the ČSSR.

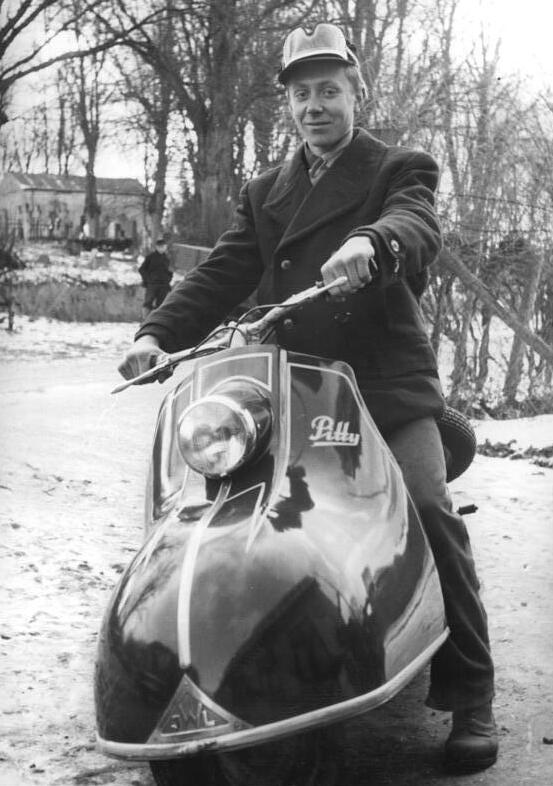
A farmer on an IWL Pitty scooter near Rostock in Mecklenburg in January 1956.

However, the DDR decided that its scooter would be made only with indigenous DDR components, so the IFA RT 125/1 unit was selected. The engine displaced 123 cc, produced 5.5 bhp and had a three-speed transmission. It was smaller and less powerful than 174 cc ČZ engine, and also than engines that were being fitted in West German scooters by 1954 that produced abetween 9 and 12 bhp. This put the DDR's scooter at a competitive disadvantage before it even entered production. The MZ factory at Zschopau would increase engine production to supply the expected scooter demand.

The DDR's established EMW, MZ and Simson motorcycle factories were already fully occupied making their own products, so if the country was to make its own scooter it would have to be in a different factory. The DDR's planned economy could be criticised for choosing the IWL factory as thousands of MZ engines would have to be transported at least 110 miles (180 km) from Zschopau to Ludwigsfelde. However, Ludwigsfelde was in the centre of the DDR and is on the outskirts of Berlin. The capital's radial rail and road links could distribute the finished scooters efficiently, and East Berlin could be expected to be one of the largest urban markets for them. If there was a mistake, it was to rely on expanding engine production at Zschopau when IWL had nearly twenty years' experience of making engines at Ludwigsfelde.

The prototype scooter really needed further development before being put into production. However, in the wake of the June 1953 uprising the DDR government was in a hurry to implement its Neue Kurs ("New Course") policy to improve the supply of consumer goods. This put the VEB Industriewerke Ludwigsfelde under great pressure to begin scooter production by 1955.

=== Pitty ===
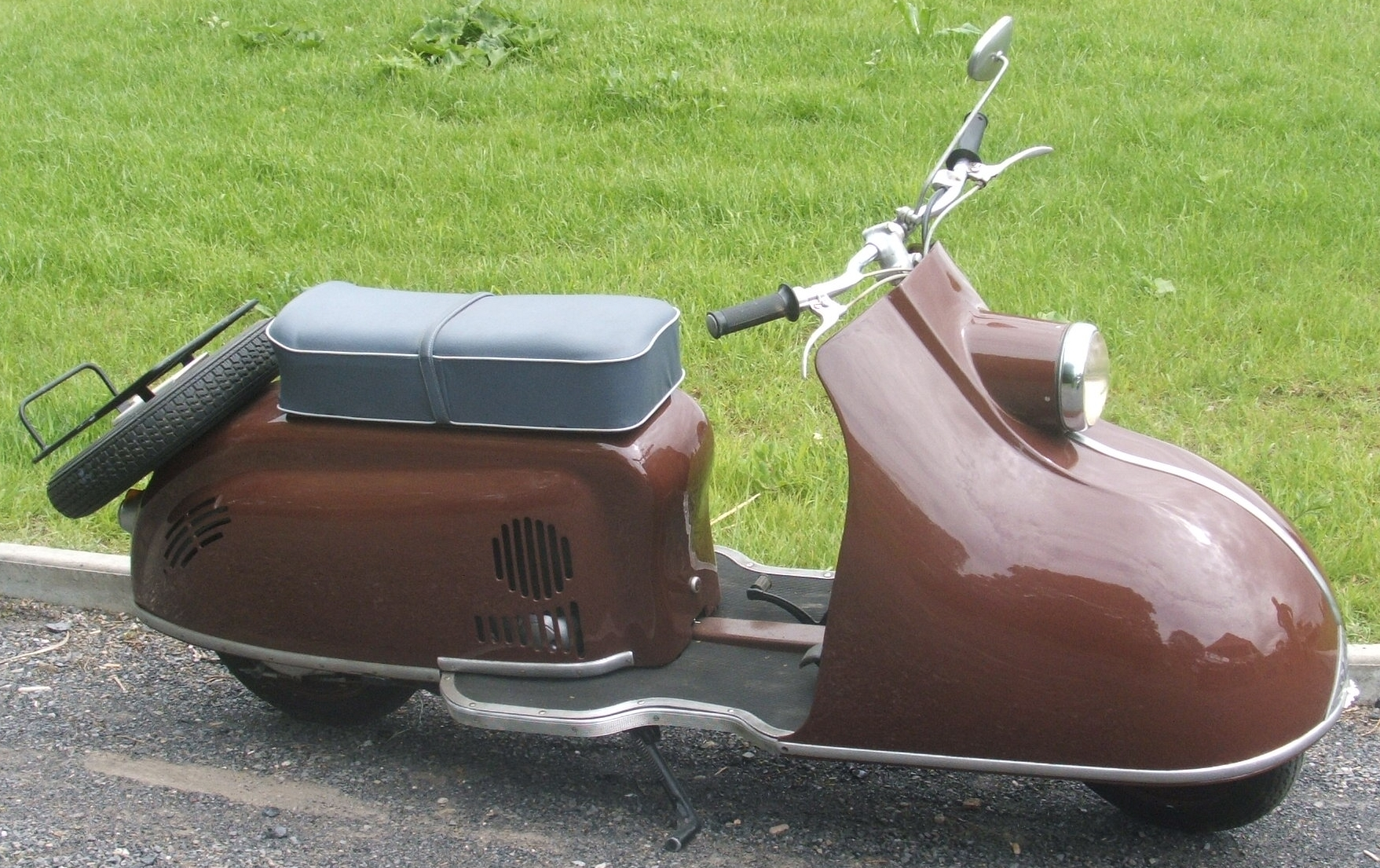
1955 IWL Pitty

IWL's first production model, named the Pitty, was launched early in 1955 at a retail price of 2,300 Marks. The Pitty's front wheel had leading link suspension, while its rear wheel had hydraulically damped swingarm suspension on which the engine and gearbox unit was mounted: an arrangement that Vespa had pioneered. However, IWL followed West German practice in mounting the engine in front of the rear wheel instead of beside it, thus giving the Pitty a much longer wheelbase than its Italian counterparts.

On a scooter, a pressed-steel full enclosure under the seat encases the rear wheel, engine and gearbox. In order to remain within its operating temperature range, a cooling fan was added to the air-cooled MZ engine. Powering this fan sapped the engine's already inadequate 5 PS power output. IWL copied Glas and Heinkel by giving the Pitty a large fairing that enveloped the front wheel. This increased the scooter's weight to 139 kilograms (306 lb), which was heavy for its class and further impeded its under-powered performance. IWL claimed a 70 km/h (43 mph) top speed, but in practice this was seldom achieved.

At the beginning of 1955, reporters from the East German Der deutsche Straßenverkehr magazine tested the Pitty and gave IWL numerous suggestions to improve it. Numerous customers who bought the scooter also complained. The Pitty has a dualseat that riders complained was too hard. Unlike most scooters, the Pitty has no steering lock for security. Its only anti-theft device is a flap in the enclosure under the seat that can be closed over the fuel tap and locked. IWL reacted to criticism by quickly developing a successor model, and kept the Pitty in production for only just over a year. In this time a total of only 11,293 Pitty scooters were built.

=== SR 56 Wiesel ===
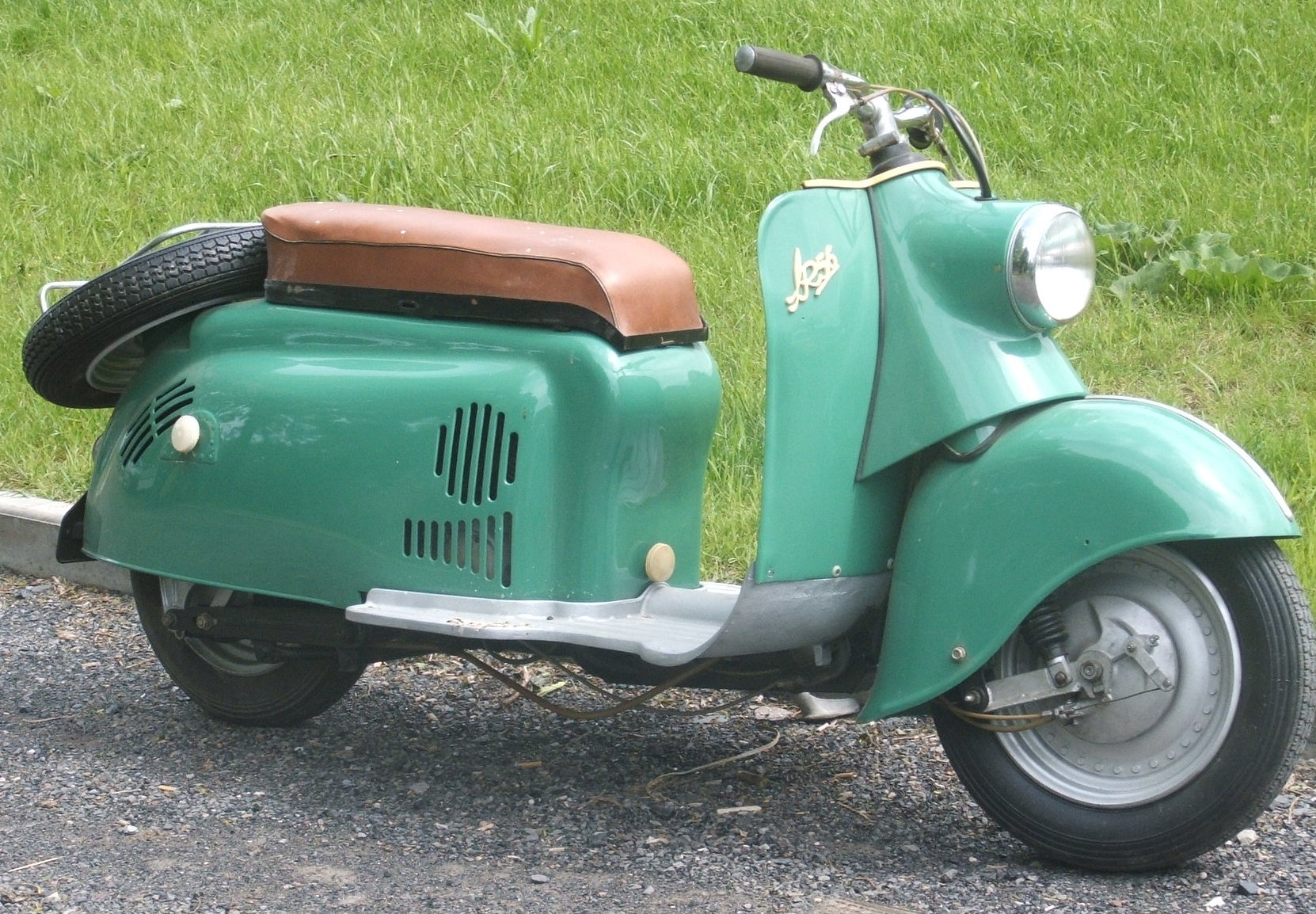
IWL SR 56 Wiesel

In 1956 IWL replaced the Pitty with the SR 56 Wiesel. "SR" stands for StadtRoller ("town scooter"), 56 is the year, and Wiesel is German for weasel. Instead of the Pitty's huge fairing, the Wiesel has a more conventional scooter fairing behind the front wheel and a separate front mudguard. This reduced the weight to 124 kg (273 lb): still heavy, but 15 kg (33 lb) lighter than the Pitty. The rear swingarm was of a new trapezoidal design, which allowed the chain's tension to remain constant as the rear wheel travelled vertically. The fuel tank was increased to 12 L (3.2 US gal; 2.6 imp gal), which gave the scooter a 340 km (210 mi) range.

Also in 1956 MZ introduced the RT 125/2 motorcycle, for which it marginally increased engine power to 6 PS. Both the weight reduction and the power increase were small, and the Wiesel's power-to-weight ratio was inferior to that of numerous western competitors. IWL claimed a 60 km/h (37 mph) cruising speed, but in reality the Wiesel was only 3 or 4 km/h (2 mph) faster than the Pitty.

Despite customer complaints, the Wiesel retained its predecessor's hard upholstery, lockable fuel tap flap and lack of a steering lock. It was easy for a thief to force the flap, and Der deutsche Straßenverkehr's testers were astonished that IWL had not rectified this fault from the previous model. IWL produced the Wiesel until 1959, by which time a total of 57,400 had been built.

=== SR 59 Berlin ===
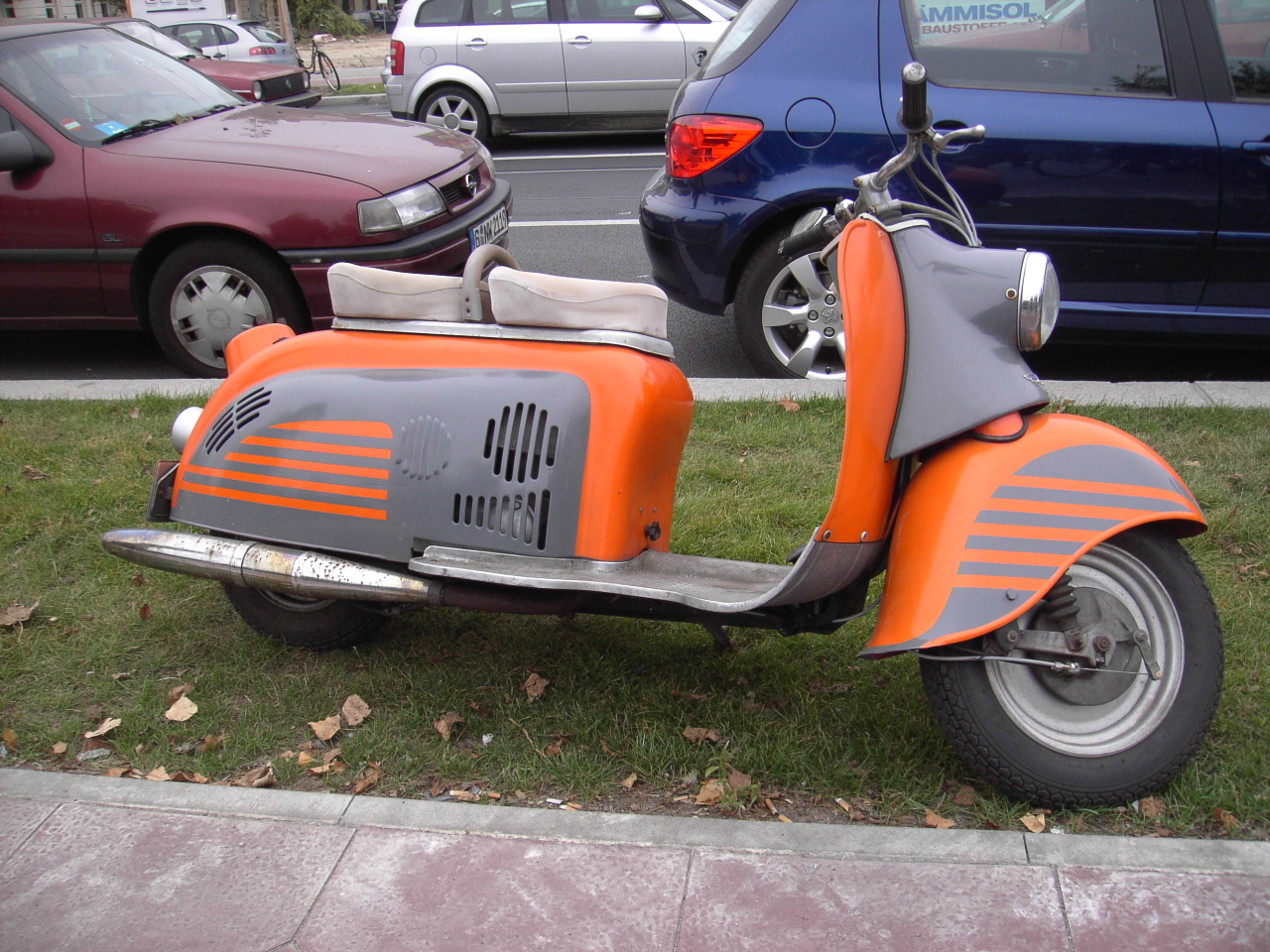
Some IWL enthusiasts keep their scooters' appearance as standard, while others such as the owner of this SR 59 Berlin have adopted highly individual custom colour schemes.

In 1959 IWL replaced the SR 56 Wiesel with the SR 59 Berlin. This shared the same bodywork as the Wiesel but had well-upholstered separate saddles for the rider and pillion passenger. Also in 1959, MZ introduced the RT 125/3 motorcycle, which had not only a slightly more powerful engine but also a four-speed transmission. IWL specially requested that the version of the RT 125/3 motor made for the scooter be bored out to 143 cc, which increased power output to 7.5 bhp. IWL credibly claimed a top speed of 82 km/h (51 mph) and a cruising speed of 70 km/h (43 mph). The four-speed transmission improved the machine's flexibility, making hill-climbing significantly less strenuous. The Berlin at last gave riders in the DDR a scooter that was good enough for practical use. It was therefore just as well that IWL at last included a steering lock to secure the relatively desirable Berlin against theft.

The Berlin still had less power than many of its western counterparts. In common with its predecessors, its front suspension was undamped, which on roads as bumpy as the DDR's was a significant weak point. Nevertheless, the Berlin secured IWL's first export orders. IWL produced the Berlin until the end of 1962, by which time a total of 113,943 had been built.

=== Campi trailer ===
Although IWL projected the Berlin as a "town scooter", new private motor vehicles were in such short supply in the DDR that customers made no such distinction. The Berlin was capable of longer journeys, including holidays, but a scooter has far less luggage capacity than either a small car or a motorcycle and sidecar combination. Instead of devising a sidecar to fit the Berlin, IWL collaborated with Stoye of Leipzig, the DDR's sidecar manufacturer, to develop a lightweight, single-wheel trailer.

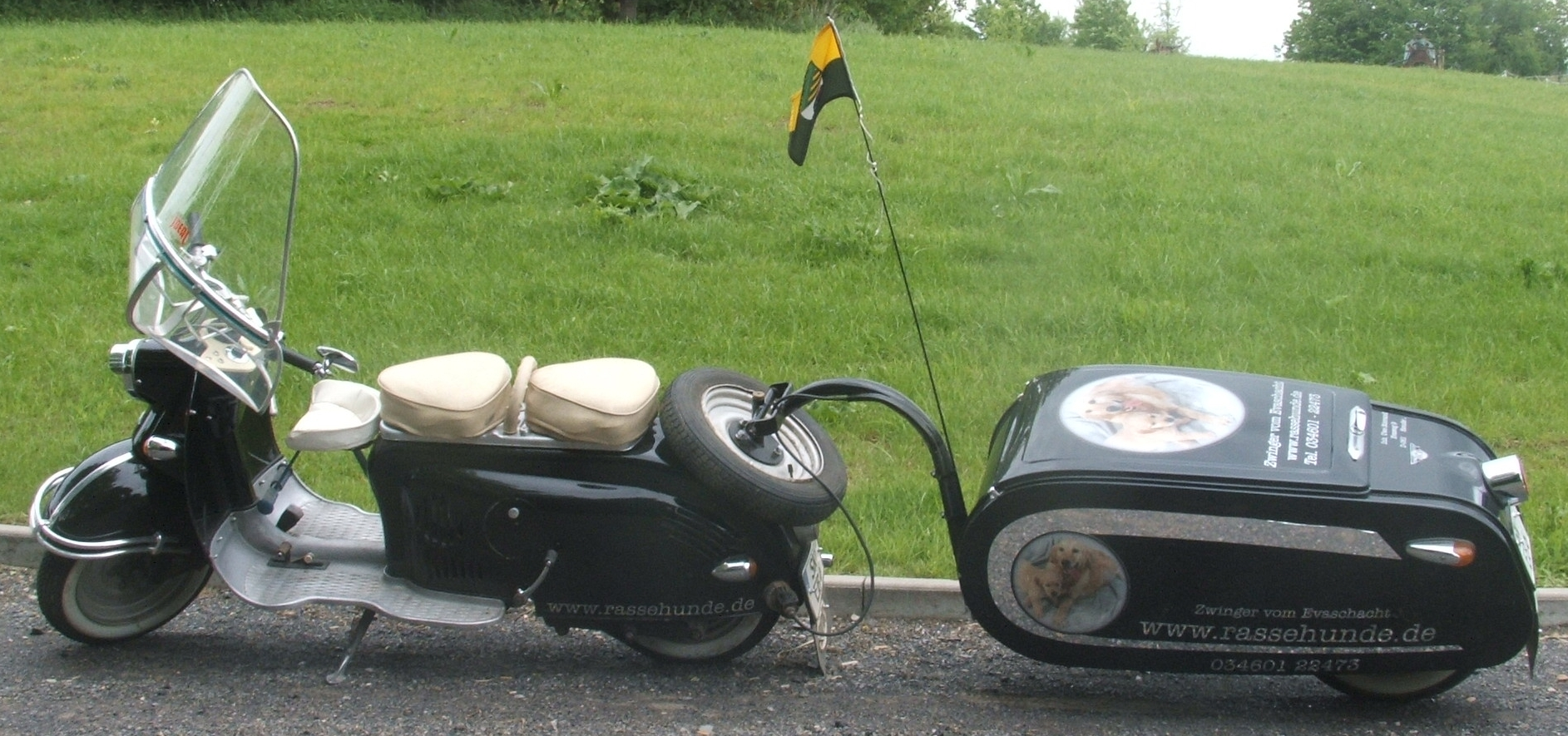
SR 59 Berlin with IWL-Stoye Campi trailer.

The result was the Campi trailer, which was styled to complement a scooter and was roomy enough to carry a set of 1960s camping equipment. IWL made the Campi's chassis, including a tubular steel towing link that connected to the scooter behind the pillion seat and above the rear light. Stoye made the bodywork, which is aluminium and contributes to the trailer weighing only 30 kg (66 lb). This made it light enough for a Berlin's 7.5 bhp engine to cope with the combined weight of its rider, passenger, trailer and luggage, albeit at markedly less speed than when being ridden solo.

The Campi added inconveniently to the length of the scooter, while adding less luggage capacity than a sidecar. Because of these limitations, its use was confined chiefly to holiday and leisure journeys. The Campi was made until 1965, by when about 5,700 had been built.

=== TR 150 Troll 1 ===
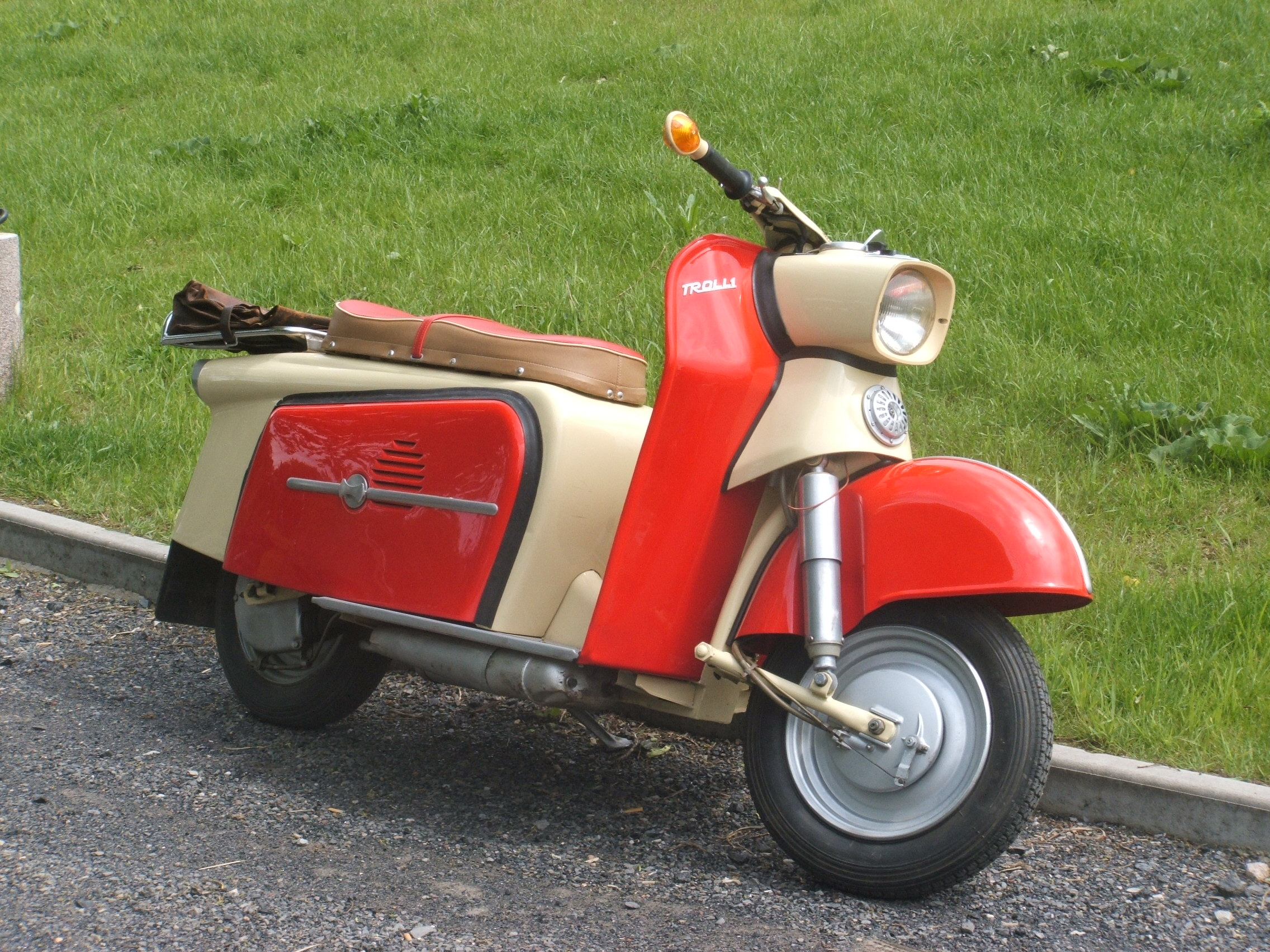
1964 example of the TR 150 Troll 1, with original handlebar-end indicators

In 1963 IWL replaced the SR 59 Berlin with the TR 150 Troll 1. Whereas the Wiesel and Berlin had retailed for 2,300 Marks, the same price as a Pitty in 1954, for the Troll 1 the price was increased to 2,550 Marks.

"TR" stands for TourenRoller and the backronym "Troll" stands for TourenRoller Ludwigsfelde ("Ludwigsfelde touring scooter"), emphasising the longer journeys on which IWL scooters were now being ridden. The "1" at the end evidently indicated that IWL hoped to develop a further model. However, in December 1962, during the Troll 1's development, the Ministerrat der DDR ("Council of Ministers of the GDR") had announced that the factory would switch to making a new model of IFA truck. This decision may have acted as a disincentive to improve the Troll 1 from before the model's launch in 1963 until the end of production in 1965.

Both in Germany and in most of the European states to which IWL might have hoped to export scooters, trolls are known from Norse mythology and Scandinavian folklore as beings that are in many cases slow-witted, in some cases ugly, seldom friendly to humans and in a few cases inclined to kill and eat people. Why any vehicle maker would choose to name one of its models after such creatures is not clear.

In 1962 MZ had introduced the ES 150 motorcycle, and the scooter version of its 143 cc engine supplied for the Troll 1 had its power increased to 9.5 bhp. The rear chain runs in an oilbath in a patent MZ hard-rubber enclosure, which keeps oil in and dirt out and greatly prolongs chain life. IWL revised the bodywork, giving a tail unit like that of the Heinkel Tourist model A2 and quickly detachable side panels like a Dürkopp Diana. Each side panel is secured by a central bayonet lock and is simple to undo and light to remove, easing access to the engine, gearbox and rear chain.

For the Troll 1, IWL reverted to a dualseat, perhaps because twin saddles were becoming dated. The Troll 1 had 160 mm (6.3 in) diameter drum brakes: 10 mm (0.4 in) bigger than on all previous IWL models.

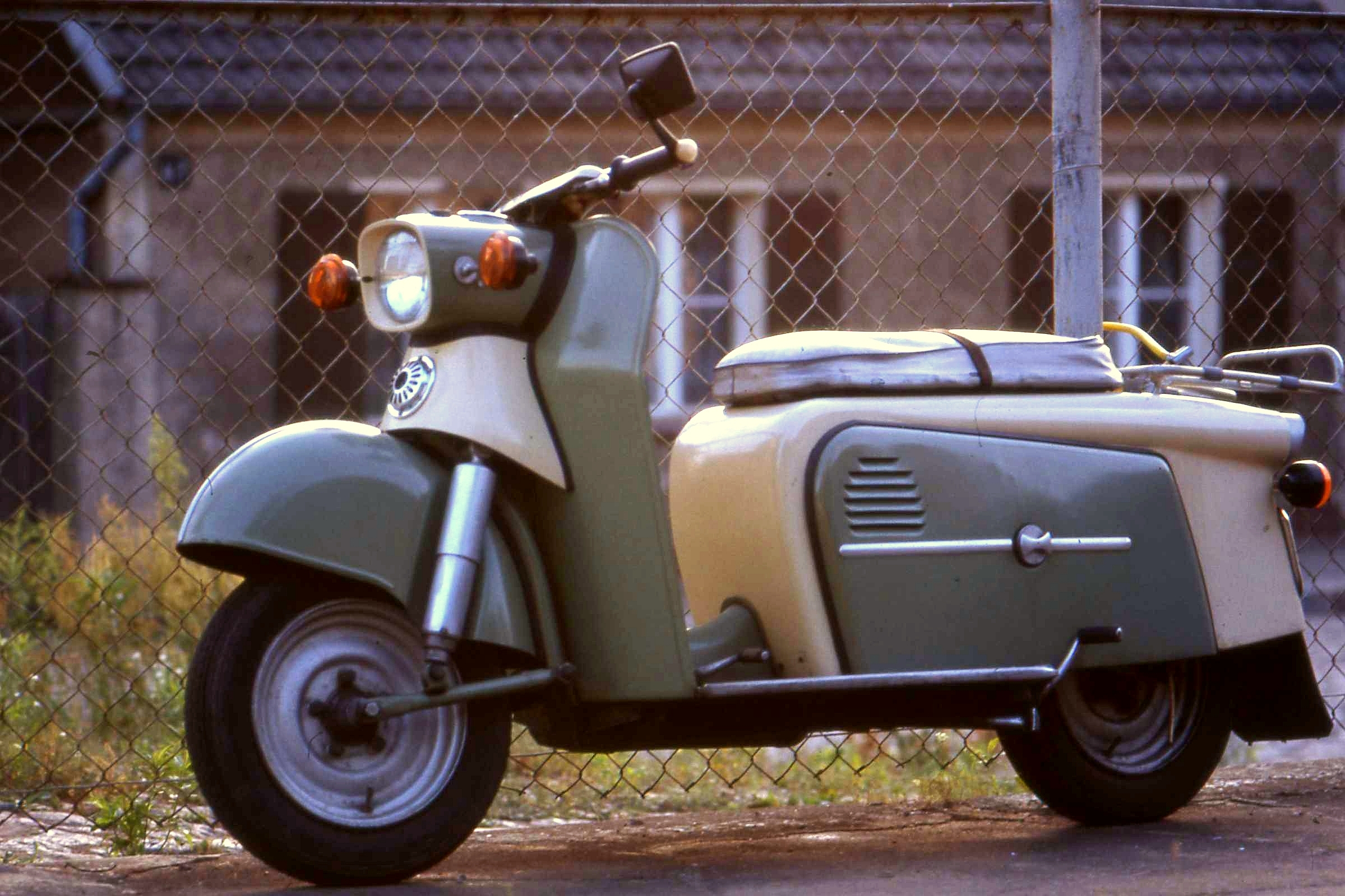
On this Troll 1 the original indicators have been replaced with more conventionally positioned modern ones.

The Troll 1 had indicators as a standard factory fitment. The front indicators are at the ends of the handlebars in a style that was becoming customary in both the BRD and the DDR at the time. In order to increase economies of scale IWL revised its scooter design to use other MZ ES 150 parts including the headlight nacelle, handlebars, front and rear shock absorbers and Earles front fork. This made the Troll 1 the first IWL scooter to have hydraulically damped front suspension.

The front mudguard of the Wiesel and Berlin would not fit with the Earles fork assembly, so IWL designed a new one to accommodate the movement of the front suspension. This necessitated a bulbous shape that was inconsistent with the improved styling of the tail unit. In 1964 East Germany's annual book Motor Jahr circumspectly observed "Diese Vorderradhaube liegt jetzt zwischen den Federbeinen, was vielleicht nicht jedermanns Geschmack trifft, aber deren gute Zugänglichkeit gewährleistet". ("This front mudguard now lies between the shock absorbers, which perhaps does not meet everyone's taste, but it ensures good access".) However, in February 1963 Der deutsche Straßenverkehr magazine had been more outspoken: "Uns konnte diese ›Linie‹ nicht sonderlich begeistern, und wir beneiden das Institut für industrielle Formgebung keinesfalls um seine Mitarbeit". ("These 'lines' cannot particularly enthuse us, and we do not at all envy the Institute for Industrial Design in their collaboration.").

The main chassis member is a welded box-section frame. IWL scooters had a long wheelbase and the Troll 1 was taller than its predecessors, which made the seating position more comfortable but made the machine more vulnerable to crosswinds. In March 1964 Der deutsche Straßenverkehr strongly criticised this shortcoming, but in the same year Motor Jahr played it down by claiming "Die Seitenwindempfindlichkeit des „Troll“ liegt in normalen Grenzen. Er reagiert auf Seitenböen nicht anders als durchschnittliche Zweiradfahrzeuge und is deshalb trotz seiner etwas höheren Schwerpunktlage auch in solchen Situationen risikilos zu fahren.". ("The Troll's crosswind stability lies within normal limits. It reacts to side gusts no differently than average two-wheeled vehicles and therefore despite a somewhat higher centre of gravity it is safe to ride in such conditions.") Customers were not fooled, and the Troll 1's crosswind instability damaged its reputation and was partly responsible for the model selling less well than its predecessors.

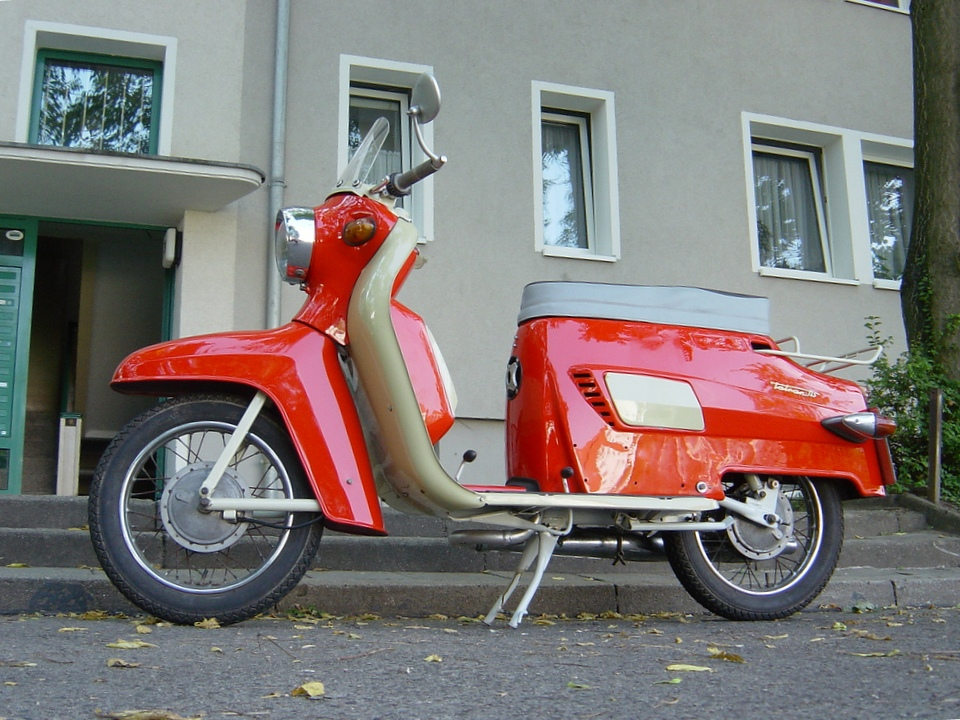
Czechoslovak-made Tatran S 125 in Slovakia

At the end of 1965 IWL ended scooter production in order to switch to making IFA W 50 trucks. By the time scooter production ended, IWL had built a total of 56,513 Troll 1's.

=== Tatran S 125 ===
From 1966 a scooter from the ČSSR was imported for sale in the DDR. The Tatran S 125 had only a 124 cc engine producing 7 PS. However, with less weight and a shorter wheelbase than any IWL model, the Tatran's power-to-weight ratio was practical and at last offered East Germans a real "town scooter".

== Commercial vehicles ==
From 1947 IFA concentrated production of large trucks at the former Horch factory in Zwickau in Saxony. In 1958 VEB Waggonfabrik Werdau at Werdau in Saxony (the former Waggonfabrik Schumann) took over as the main IFA truck factory, leaving the VEB Sachsenring Automobilwerke Zwickau to expand production of the new Trabant small car. In 1966 truck production was moved again, from Werdau to IWL at Ludwigsfelde.

=== IFA W 50 ===
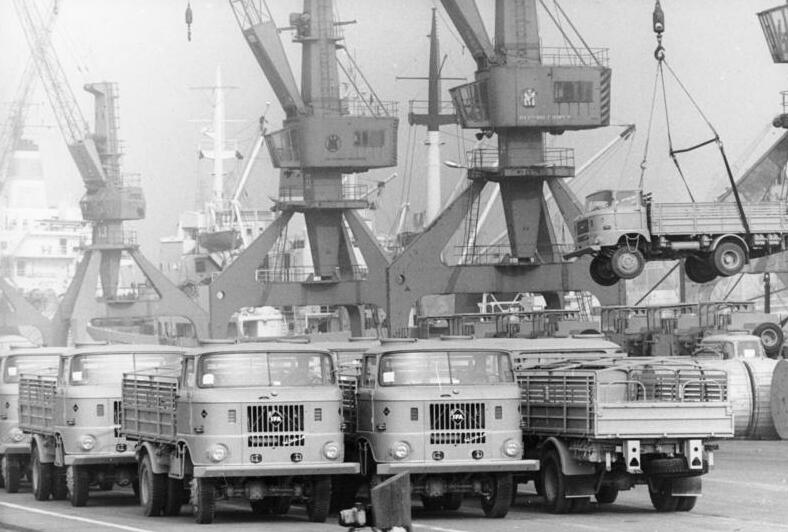
W 50 trucks from IWL on a quayside at Rostock in March 1982, being loaded onto a ship for export.

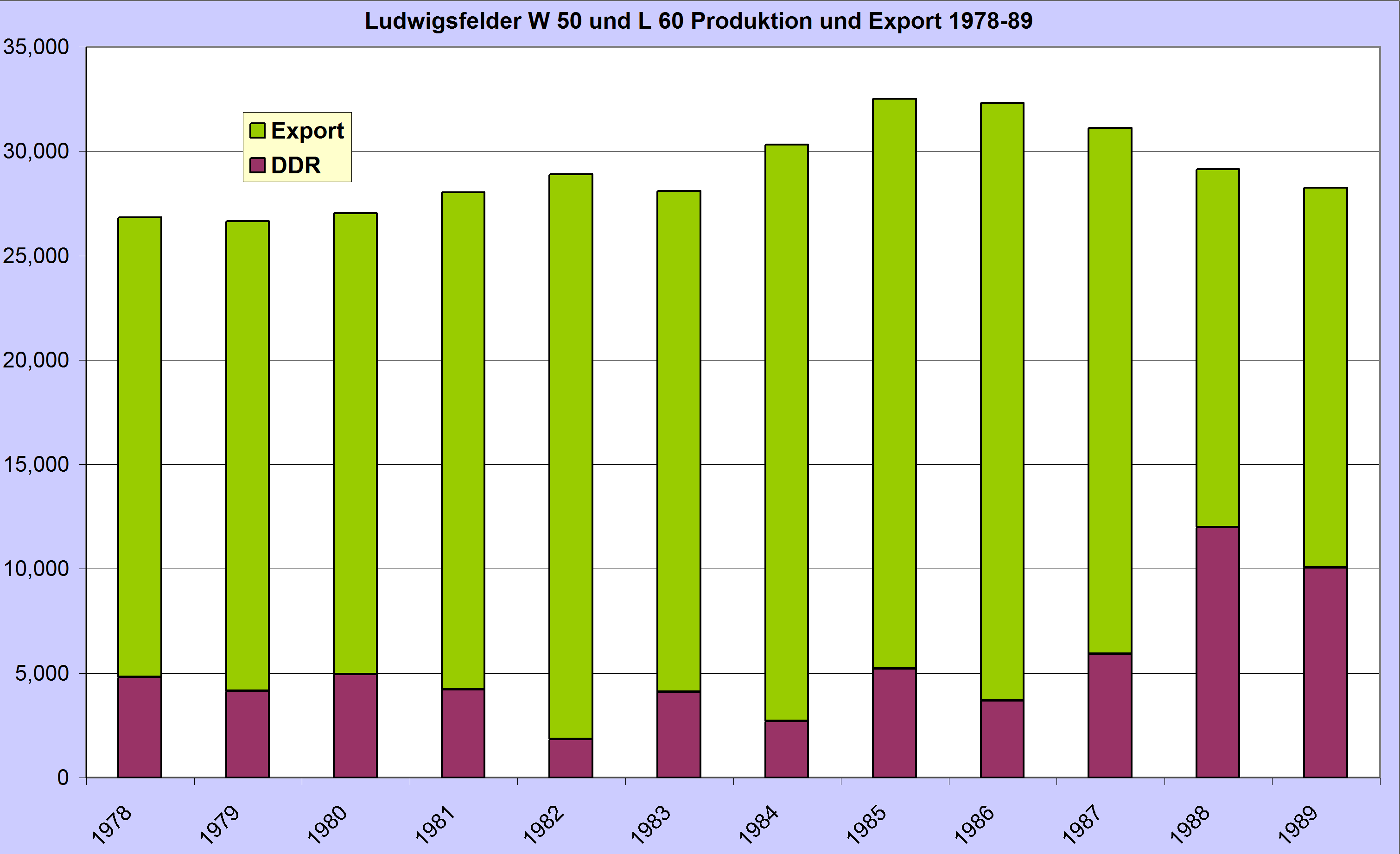
Ludwigsfelde truck production 1978–90: export sales in light green; domestic sales in dark red.

The IFA W 50, built at Ludwigsfelde from 17 July 1965 until 1990, was IFA's most important product for decades. Annual sales peaked at 32,516 in 1986. A high proportion of IWL trucks was exported. Between 1978 and 1987 over 80% of W 50 trucks built each year were sold abroad. Total W 50 production at Ludwigsfelde from 1965 to 1990 was 571,831 vehicles. It continued to be built alongside its intended replacement, the L 60.

=== IFA L 60 ===
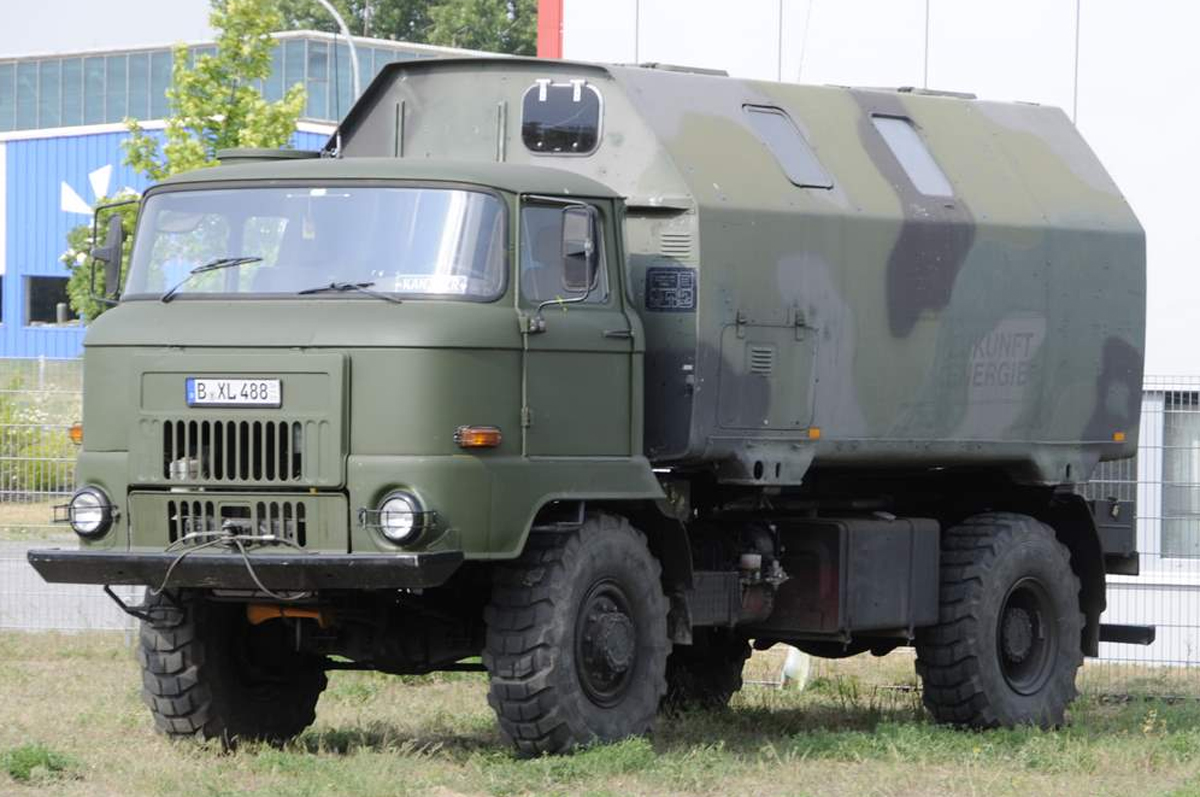
Former NVA-L60

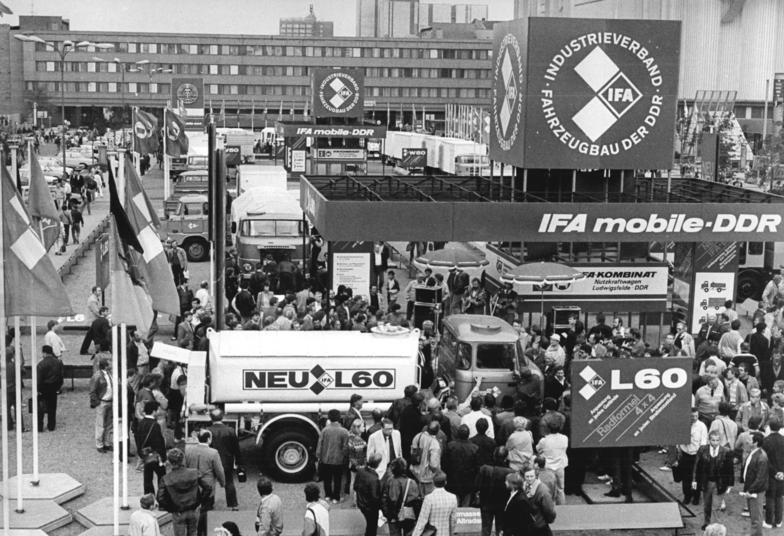
The first L 60 trucks being previewed at the Autumn Leipzig Trade Fair in September 1986.

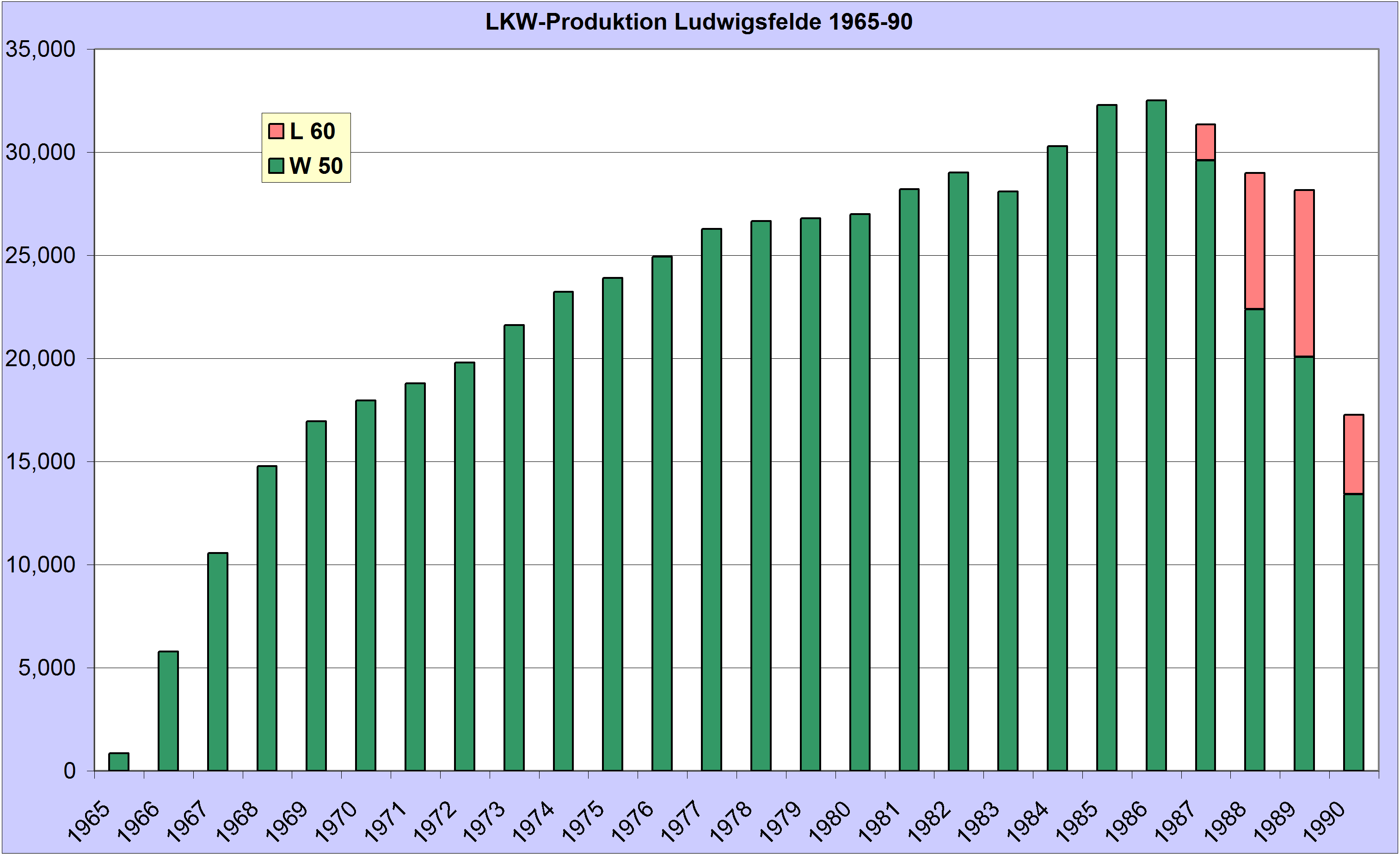
Ludwigsfelde truck production 1965–90: W 50 in dark green; L 60 in pale red.

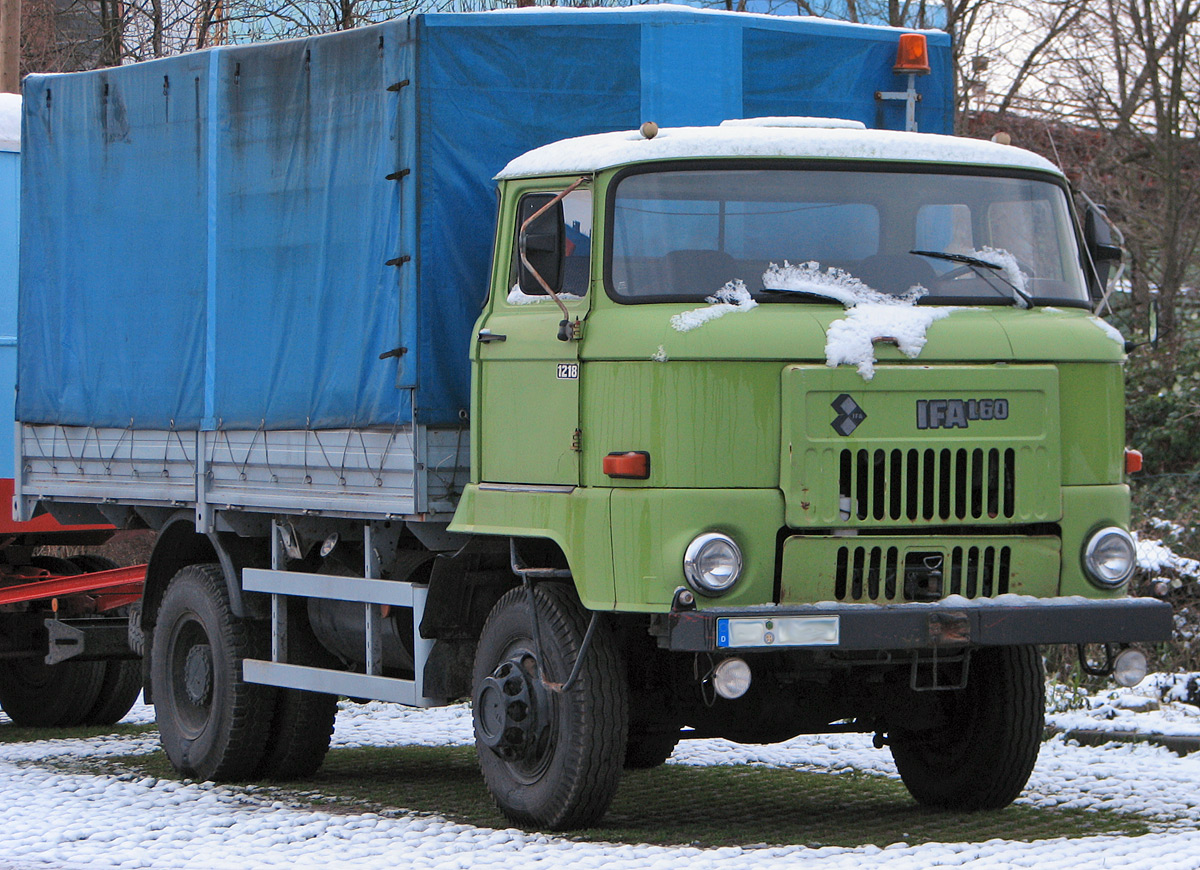
L 60 truck

After the launch of the W 50, IWL undertook development work to increase engine power and reduce fuel consumption, reduce empty weight and increase payload, improve reliability and driver comfort and reduce production time. From 1967 IWL was planning a range of new trucks with sizes of three, five, six and 10 tonnes. Two prototypes were built: a three-tonne truck code-numbered 1013 followed by an 11-tonne one code-numbered 1118.

In the first quarter of 1970 development work resumed with two new prototypes, one each of the 1013 and 1118. Considerable capacity at IWL continued to be taken up with looking after the W 50, but development of the 1118 slowly continued.

The 1118 became the IFA L 60, and development intensified from 1974. In 1978 the DDR made an agreement with Volvo Trucks to use a Volvo cab on an L 60 prototype. Within two years this resulted in a contract to make Volvo cabs under licence, for which a new production hall would be built at Ludwigsfelde. The contract would include IWL supplying cab shells to the Volvo truck plant at Ghent in Belgium and also allowed IWL to supply cabs to VEB Robur-Werke Zittau in Saxony, which made smaller trucks ranging from about 1.5 to 3.5 tonnes.

When the preparatory work for the new assembly hall at Ludwigsfelde was well advanced, Volvo tripled the price. In 1980 the Ministerrat der DDR cancelled the agreement and ordered that series production of the L 60 was to go ahead without the Volvo cab. IWL accordingly started development of a new cab, the 6400, both for the W 60 and to supply to Robur.

In 1984 IWL again reached agreement to give the L 60 a foreign cab, this time from Steyr in Austria. However, three years later the DDR could not meet Steyr's asking price for the design and the necessary production tools. Instead the L 60 was given a cab based on that of the W 50, but able to be tilted forward for access to the engine.

After the W 51 and W 52 projects were discontinued in June 1983 (see above), the L 60 programme was adapted to the needs of Iran and Iraq. The payload was increased to at least six tonnes and power output was increased to a range from 125 to 180 bhp.

The L 60 was finally unveiled to the public at the Autumn Leipzig Trade Fair in September 1986 and its series production began at Ludwigsfelde in June 1987. L 60 development had started by 1967 so the model arguably reached the market about 15 years late, and its cab derived from that of the W 50 made it look even more out of date. L 60 sales did grow each year, and in 1989 they peaked at 8,081 vehicles for that year. Total L 60 production at Ludwigsfelde from 1987 to 1990 was 20,293 vehicles.

Potential customers within the DDR were deterred not by its appearance but by its price, which was almost double that of the W 50. As a result, IWL kept the W 50 in production alongside the L 60 until 1990.

=== The end of IFA ===
The start of L 60 sales in 1987 was a turning point, but not in the way IWL wanted. After 1986, W 50 sales fell more quickly than L 60 sales grew, so IWL's total unit sales fell from an all-time peak of 32,516 in 1986 to 28,152 in 1989. IWL needed a more competitive product, and in the second half of 1989 it held exploratory talks with the West German commercial vehicle builder MAN. However, these did not lead to a joint project.

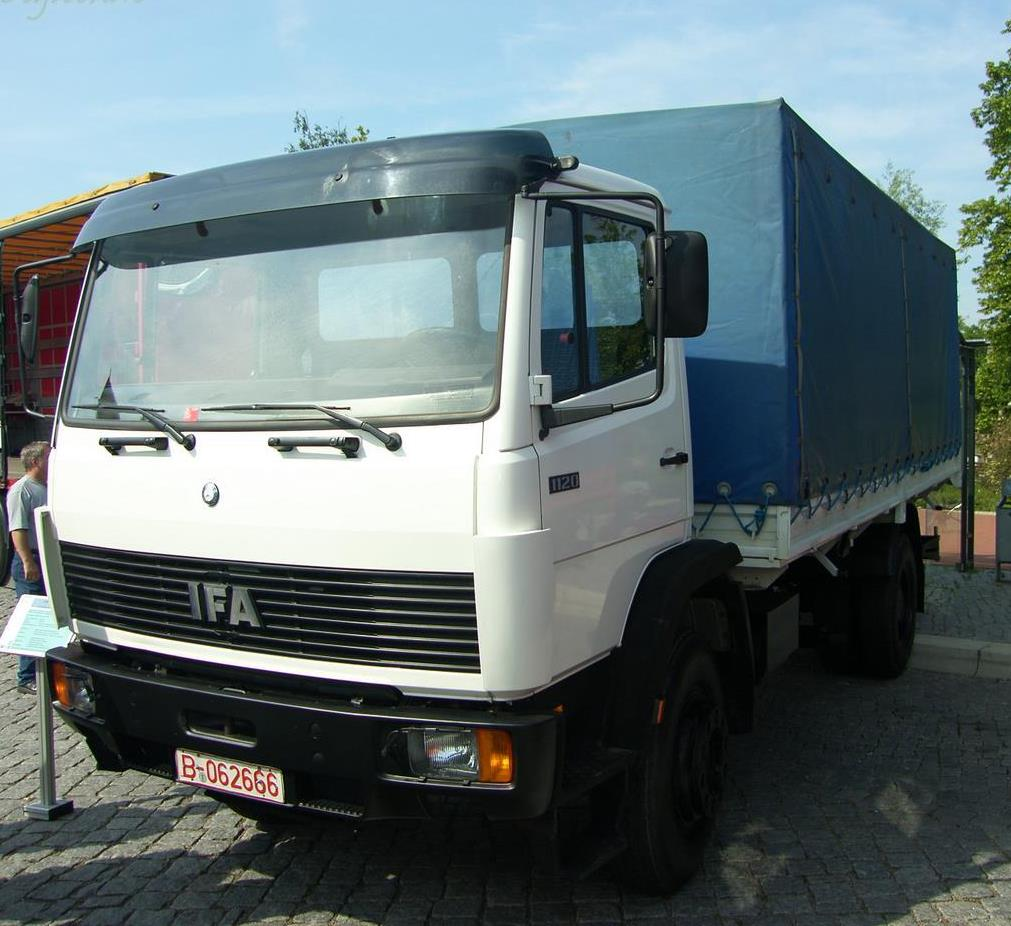
IFA 1318 prototype with Mercedes cab

The DDR's Peaceful Revolution took place in September and October 1989. This was followed by contact between IWL and Mercedes-Benz in February 1990 that launched a joint project designated IFA 1318. A prototype IFA 1318 truck, with a Mercedes-Benz LN2 cab on an L 60 chassis, was completed on 3 May 1990. The IFA-Kombinat Nutzkraftwagen ("IFA Goods Vehicle Combine") was broken up and in June 1990 a separate IFA-Automobilwerk Ludwigsfelde GmbH was founded under the Treuhandanstalt.

However, the DDR's adoption of the West German Deutsche Mark on 1 July 1990 led Mercedes-Benz to withdraw from the intended deal by 18 July. As a result, IWL projected that it would reduce its workforce from 8,334 at the end of June 1990 to about 3,150 by the end of the year. The Treuhand would help with the cost of redundancy payments and 2,514 employees would be converted to other work and would be kept on short time until mid-1991.

Even this plan was overtaken by the collapse of its established markets in eastern Europe. Orders and production plummeted and in 1990 a combined total of only 17,275 trucks were completed — the lowest number since 1969. L 60 production was terminated in August 1990, and W 50 production was ended 17 December that year.

=== Mercedes vans ===
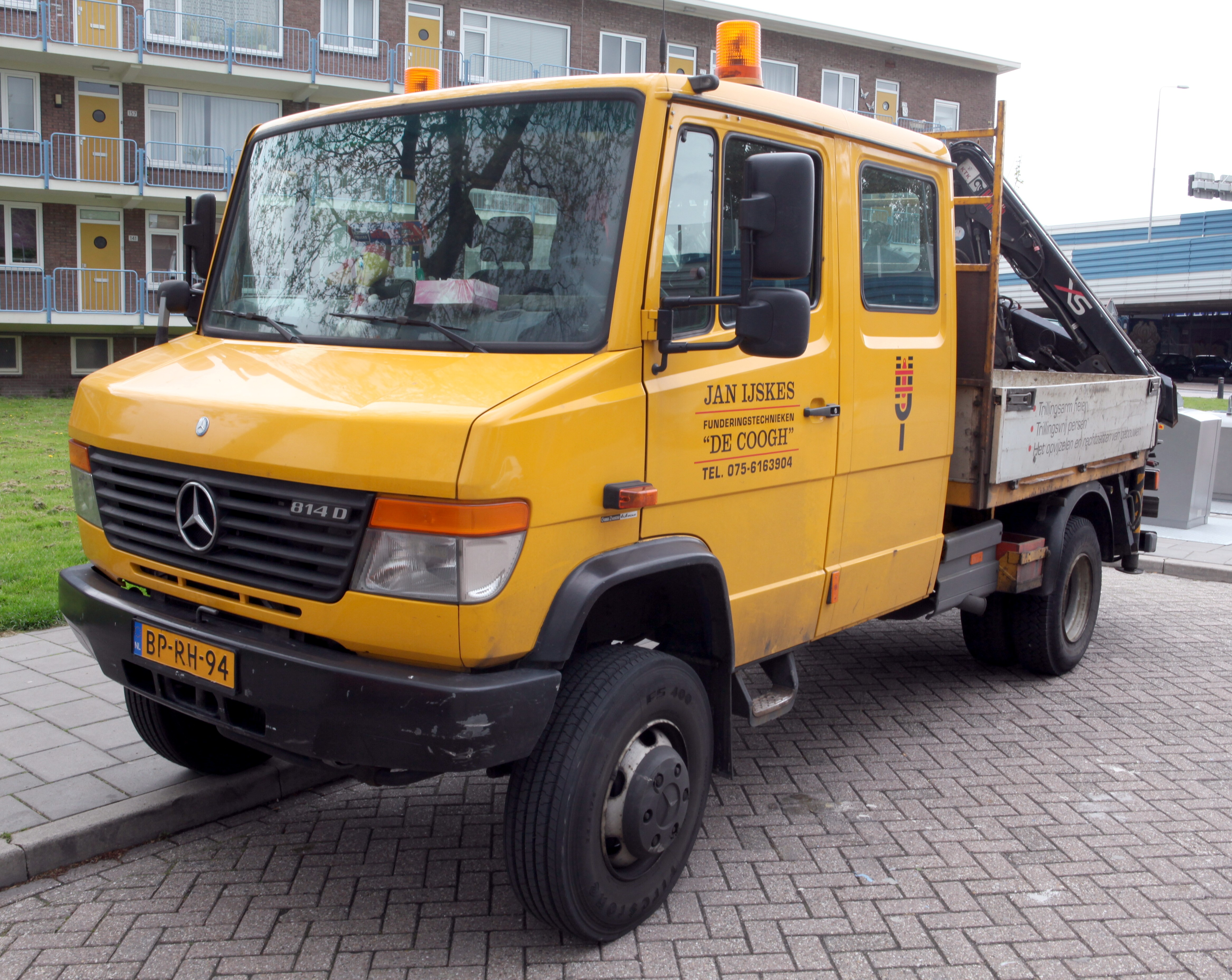
1990s Mercedes 814 DA pickup truck with crew cab in 2009

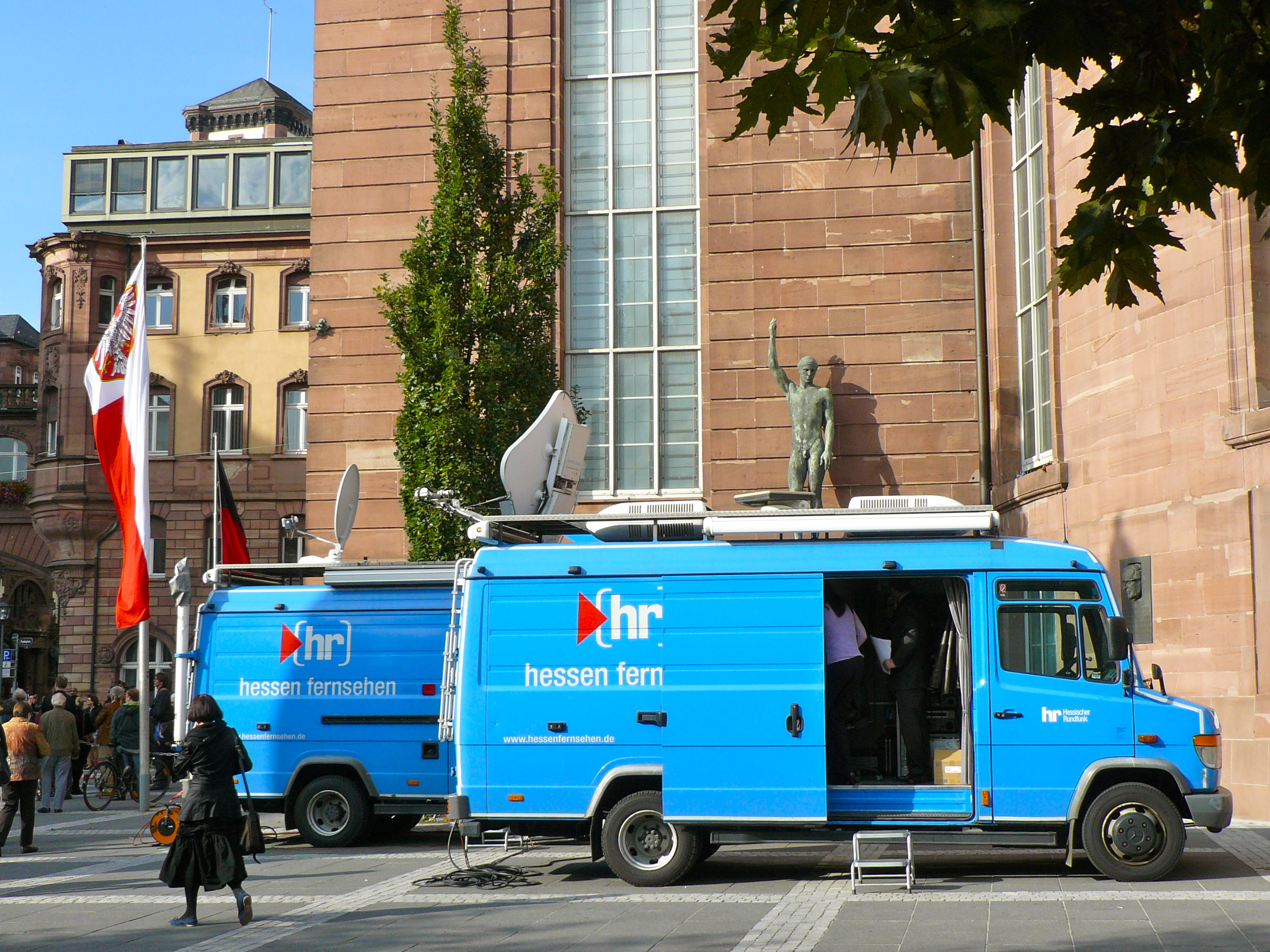
Two 1990s Mercedes Vario outside broadcasting vans in 2010

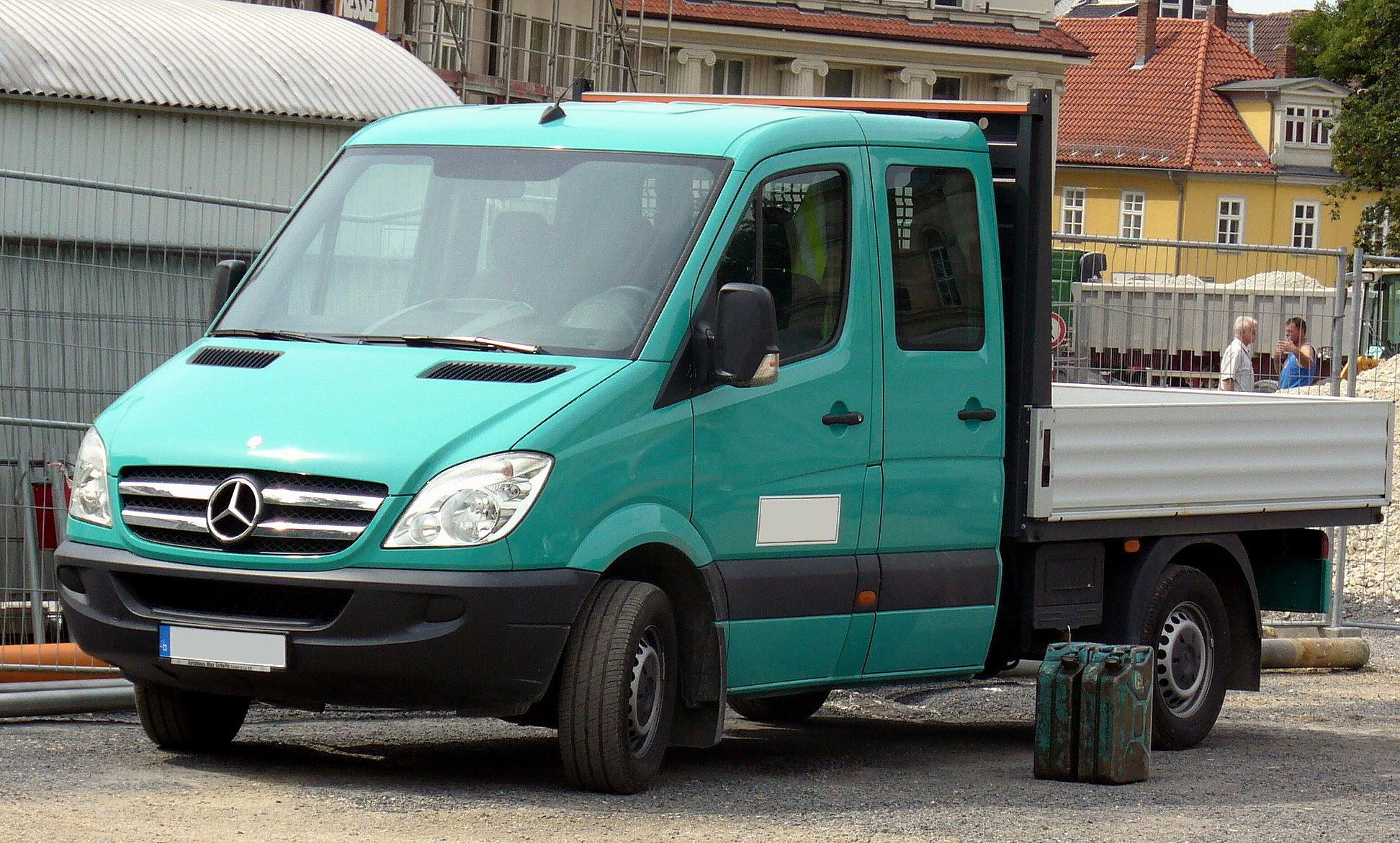
New Mercedes NCV3 Sprinter pickup truck with crew cab in 2007

On 5 October 1990 Mercedes-Benz and the Treuhand reached an agreement on the future of the IWL factory. On 1 February 1991 the Nutzfahrzeuge Ludwigsfelde GmbH (NLG or "Ludwigsfelde Goods Vehicles") and Entwicklungsgesellschaft für Kraftfahrzeugtechnik Ludwigsfelde (ELG or "Ludwigsfelde Development Company for Motor Vehicle Technology) were founded. The Treuhand owned 75% and Mercedes-Benz owned 25%. On 8 February 1991 Ludwigsfelde assembled its first Mercedes vehicle, an LK 814, and three months later it started making Mercedes cabs. Ludwigsfelde began assembly of the T2 "Transporter" model in September and afterwards was completely transferred there from Mercedes-Benz' Düsseldorf plant.

On 1 December 1993 Mercedes-Benz and the Treuhand made a new agreement, that from 1 January 1994 NLG and EGL would become 100% subsidiaries of Mercedes-Benz. At the same time the Ludwigsfelde factory would take over all production of Mercedes goods vehicles in the 4.5 tonne to 7.5 tonne range. On 1 July 1996 Ludwigsfelde began production of a further development of the T 2, the W670 Vario. On 1 July 1997 NLG and EGL were merged as Daimler-Benz Ludwigsfelde GmbH.

Between December 1999 and 2001 DaimlerChrysler (the parent company between 1998 and 2007) invested in the order of 500 million Deutsche Mark to redevelop the Ludwigsfelde plant and prepare it to make the W414 Vaneo. Ludwigsfelde made the Vaneo from 25 September 2001 until 8 July 2005. Since 2006 the plant has made NCV3 Sprinter vans, and major elements of the VW LT3 Crafter.

== Bibliography ==
- Kirchberg, Peter (2000). Plaste Blech und Planwirtschaft — Die Geschichte des Automobilbaus in der DDR (in German). Berlin: Nicolaische Verlagsbuchhandlung Beuermann GmbH. ISBN 3-87584-027-5.
- Rönicke, Frank (2009). DDR-Motorräder seit 1945. Typenkompass (in German) (2nd ed.). Stuttgart: Motorbuch Verlag. ISBN 978-3-613-02776-3.
- Salzmann, G (1999). "Unterwegs mit »Troll« 1". In Schrader, Halwart (ed.). Motorräder aus der DDR (in German) (2nd ed.). Stuttgart: Schrader Verlag. pp. 183–187. ISBN 3-613-87176-9.
- Schröder, Wolfgang (2009). Die Motorrad- und PKW-Produktion der DDR — AWO • MZ • Simson • Trabant • Wartburg (in German) (1st ed.). Bielefeld: Delius Klasing Verlag. ISBN 978-3-7688-2517-7.
