= Evelyne Clopet =

Evelyne Claire Clopet (14 February 1922 – 10 August 1944) was a French heroine of the resistance in World War II.

Clopet was born in Pornic, France, the daughter of a Merchant Navy captain later based in Casablanca. At the outbreak of World War lI, Clopet joined her parents in Morocco and, after the American landings in Casablanca in 1942, volunteered as a fighter for the Free French.

Clopet was sent to England where she joined the BCRA (Bureau Central de Renseignements et d'Action (Central Bureau of Intelligence and Action)). She underwent intensive training, took the code name of "Chamonet" in England and "Claudet" in France and was given the rank of second lieutenant.

Clopet was parachuted into France from a Liberator near Liglet on 7 July 1944, as part of the Sussex Plan to establish an intelligence gathering network of French-speaking underground agents and radio operatives in occupied France. One day her group was stopped by German troops when driving a lorry in Lavardin and their arms and radio equipment discovered. They were taken for interrogation and shot at Vendôme on 10 August 1944.

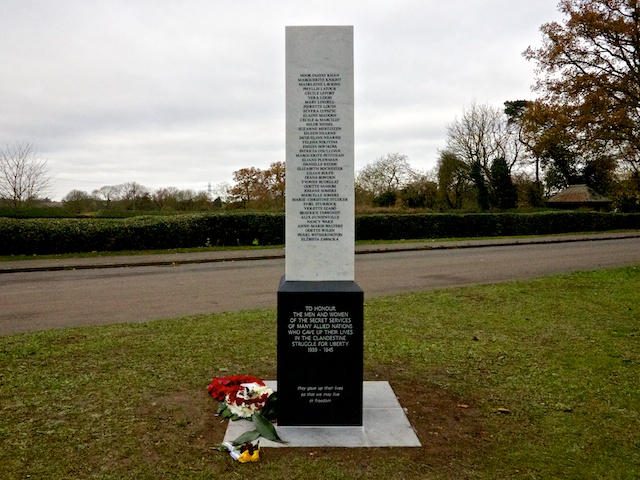
Tempsford Memorial

Clopet was recognised as "Mort pour la France". Her name is inscribed on the Casablanca war memorial and on the memorial of Saint-Ouen (Loir-et-Cher) where she is buried in the cemetery. It is also included in the list of names on the Tempsford Memorial in Bedfordshire, which honours the women who served as secret agents in occupied Europe. A street in Clopet's home town of Pornic is named after her.
