= Tempsford Memorial =

Coordinates: 52.1640°N 0.3020°W

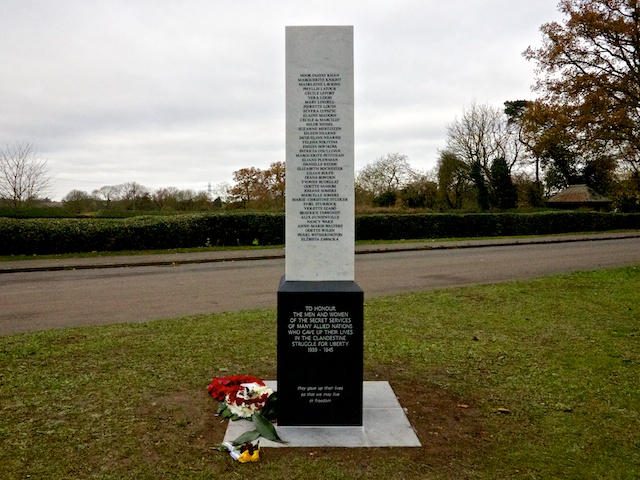
Tempsford Memorial

The Tempsford Memorial is a war memorial in the village of Tempsford in Bedfordshire. The village was the home of RAF Tempsford. The memorial commemorates the women who served as secret agents in occupied Europe during the Second World War, the RAF aircrew who transported them, and the personnel from allied secret services who were killed in the war. The memorial bears the names of 75 known women agents, of whom 29 were arrested, 16 were executed, three died of illnesses while imprisoned, and one committed suicide using a cyanide L-pill before being captured.

== Background ==
Missions by British secret agents to Nazi-occupied Europe during the Second World War were coordinated by the Special Operations Executive, with participation from the UK Secret Intelligence Service (MI6), the Free French Bureau Central de Renseignements et d'Action, the US Office of Strategic Services, and the Soviet NKVD. Most were flown out by the RAF's Special Duties "moon" squadrons, 138 Squadron and 161 Squadron, from RAF Tempsford, with some operations starting from RAF Tangmere or RAF Harrington.

A book of remembrance at St Peter’s Church in Tempsford lists 623 airmen from the two squadrons killed during the war. It is believed that 995 agents were dropped into occupied Europe by parachute, 485 were landed by aircraft, and around 575 agents and others were brought back to the UK.

== Memorial ==
The memorial comprises a white Carrara marble column on black granite plinth. The column and the base bear inscriptions, including a list of the 75 known women agents. The top of one face of the white column bears a mosaic disc, depicting a white dove and the full moon in a blue sky, made by many local villagers.

The sides of the granite plinth also commemorate the men and women of the two special duties squadrons, No. 138 and No. 161, and the personnel of the secret services from allied nations killed during the war "in the clandestine struggle for freedom and liberty".

The memorial was commissioned by the Tempsford Memorial Trust and created by Ivett & Reed, stonemasons based in Cambridge. It is erected at the Millennium Sanctuary in Tempsford, near the cemetery of St Peter's church.

The memorial was unveiled by the Prince of Wales on 3 December 2013, who completed the mosaic by inserting the last piece at the centre of the moon, with a flypast by a Lysander in the colours of 161 Squadron. In attendance was the Lord Lieutenant of Bedfordshire, with Baroness Crawley, Sir John Sawers, delegates from the 12 countries listed, and veterans and relatives of the SOE agents and RAF personnel.

== Women commemorated ==
UK

- "Angela" (full name not known)
- Yvonne Baseden
- Sonya Butt
- Muriel Byck (died of illness)
- Blanche Charlet
- Yvonne Cormeau
- Lise de Baissac
- Yvonne Fontaine
- Olga Jackson
- Marguerite Knight
- Phyllis Latour
- Cicely Lefort (killed in captivity)
- Vera Leigh (executed)
- Mary Lindell
- Eileen Nearne
- Jacqueline Nearne
- Lilian Rolfe (executed)
- Diana Rowden
- Yvonne Rudelatt (died in captivity)
- Sybil Anne Sturrock
- Violette Szabó (executed)
- Anne-Marie Walters
- Odette Wilen
- Pearl Witherington

France

- Françine Agazarian
- Julienne Aisner
- Marie-Lou Blanc
- Denise Bloch (executed)
- Jeanne Bohec
- Andrée Borrel (executed)
- Marie-Louise Cloarec (executed)
- Evelyne Clopet (executed)
- Aimée Corge
- Madeleine Damerment (executed)
- Cécile De Marcilly
- Eugénie Djendi (executed)
- Alix d'Unienville
- Marie-Madeleine Fourcade
- Marguerite Gianello
- Eugénie Gruner
- Jeanette Guyot
- Germaine Heim
- Ginette Jullian
- Madeleine Lavigne
- Marie Thérèse Le Chêne
- Pierrette Louin (executed)
- Suzanne Mertzizen (executed)
- Marguerite Petitjean
- Eliane Plewman (executed)
- Danielle Georgette Reddé
- Odette Sansom
- Josianne Somers
- Marcelle Somers
- Marie-Christine Studler
Belgium
- Frédérique Dupuich
- Elaine Madden
- Beatrix Terwindt

Chile

- Giliana Gerson

Germany

- Hilde Meisel (cyanide pill)
- Anne Beyer

Ireland

- Mary Herbert
- Patricia O'Sullivan

India

- Noor Inayat Khan (executed)

Netherlands

- Jos Gemmeke
- Josephine Hamilton

New Zealand

- Nancy Wake

Poland

- Krystyna Skarbek-Granville
- Elżbieta Zawacka

Switzerland

- Yolande Beekman (executed)

US

- Elizabeth Devereux-Rochester
- Virginia Hall

USSR

- Anna Frolova (executed)
- Szyfra Lypszyc (executed)
- Yelena Nikitina
- Emilya Novikova

== See also ==
- List of female SOE agents
