= Danielle Georgette Reddé =

French WWII resistance member (1911–2007)

Danielle Georgette Reddé MBE
- Born: 7 October 1911; Châtillon-sur-Seine, Bourgogne-Franche-Comté, France
- Died: 16 July 2007 (aged 95) Le Puy-Sainte-Réparade, Provence-Alpes-Côte d'Azur, France
- Allegiance: France
- Branch: French Resistance; Bureau central de renseignements et d'action Direction générale des études et recherches Special Operations Executive
- Service number: 17213
- Known for: Parachuting into occupied France and Indochina
- Awards: British Empire Medal (United Kingdom); Colonial Medal; Combatant's Cross; Commemorative medal for voluntary service in Free France; Croix de Guerre (Croix de Guerre 1939–1945 and Croix de guerre des théâtres d'opérations extérieures); Escapees' Medal; Légion d’Honneur; Médaille militaire Order of the Million Elephants and the White Parasol (Kingdom of Laos); Resistance Medal
- Spouse: Charles de Mourgues (m. 1958)
- Children: 3

Danielle Georgette Reddé MBE (7 October 1911 – 16 July 2007), alias Camille Fournier or Édith Daniel, was a French resistance member during World War II. She was awarded medals including the British Empire Medal, Croix de Guerre, Escapees' Medal, Légion d’Honneur and Resistance Medal for her service.

== Early life ==
Reddé was born on 7 October 1911 in Châtillon-sur-Seine in Bourgogne-Franche-Comté, France. She worked as a typist, then at the Postes, Télégraphes et Téléphones service from 1932, assigned to Dijon and Lyon.

== Military service ==
=== World War II ===
During the German military administration in occupied France during World War II, Reddé operated as a message courier for the French resistance's Pat O'Leary Line. She also helped to get French, Belgian and British escapees out of France and into Spain by providing them with clothing and food.

On 11 January 1943, Reddé was arrested, alongside Australian agent and radio operator Thomas Groome, at a house in Montauban, Occitania, France, when the resistance network she was part of was betrayed. They were taken to Hôtel de l'Ours Blanc in Toulouse, the Gestapo headquarters, for questioning. Left unguarded in a commotion while Groome tried to escape by throwing himself out of a window, Reddé slipped out of the headquarters. Groome was recaptured and was later sent to a concentration camp in Germany, where he was tortured.

In March 1943, Reddé escaped to Spain with Australian resistance member Nancy Wake and nine other resistance fugitives who had escaped from the prison at Castres, crossing the Pyrénées mountains on foot. Reddé then travelled via Perpignan, Barcelona, Madrid and Gibraltar to Greenock, Scotland, then on to London, England. In London, Reddé was recruited into the Central Bureau of Intelligence and Action and the French Volunteer Corps, which became the Women's Auxiliary Corps (Corps Auxilaire Feminin). She was chosen by French politician and colonel Pierre de Chevigné to be trained in radio communications by the Bureau central de renseignements et d'action (BCRA), which was operating in exile. She trained in June 1943, alongside two other women, Eugénie Grüner and Yvonne Gittus. Reddé's service number was 17213.

The Allier Department

After her training, Reddé was parachuted from a Royal Air Force Handley Page Halifax bomber aircraft near Montluçon and the Allier Department, in February 1944. She was among the first of nine French women working for the BCRA to be parachuted into France. Reddé set up a radio transition network under the pseudonym "Moroccan" in the region of Saint-Étienne and Haute-Loire, sending messages to Free France. She remained on her mission until the end of the war in Europe. She operated under several aliases, including the code names Camille Fournier and Édith Daniel.

=== Indochina ===
Reddé then volunteered to serve in the Far East with the French Direction générale des études et recherches (Directorate General of Studies and Research, DGER, which replaced the BCRA) and the British Special Operations Executive (SOE) in the neo-colonial First Indochina War. She was parachuted into Japanese occupied Indochina with French Lieutenant Francis Klotz, into Viet Cong lines. She was the only French woman to be parachuted into Indochina during the conflict.

Reddé served as a radio operator during Operation Cantry, which aimed to locate and assist French and Allied nationals and repatriate them to Europe. After the end of her mission, she served for another year and a half in the Technical Archives office in Saigon. She returned to France in August 1947 and was demobilised.

== Personal life ==
Reddé had married Charles de Mourgues on 10 November 1958 in Châtillon, Hauts-de-Seine, France. They had two daughters and a son together.

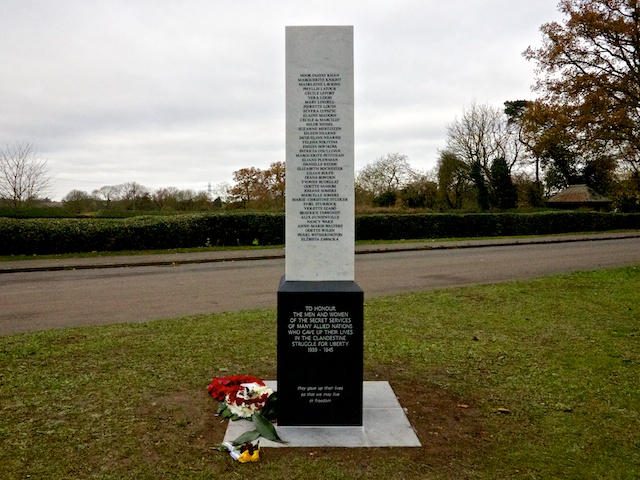
Tempsford Memorial

== Death and commemoration ==
Reddé died on 16 July 2007 in Le Puy-Sainte-Réparade in Provence-Alpes-Côte d'Azur, France, aged 95. She is commemorated on the Tempsford Memorial, the home of the former Royal Air Force station RAF Tempsford.

== Awards ==
- British Empire Medal (United Kingdom)
- Colonial Medal (France)
- Combatant's Cross (France)
- Commemorative medal for voluntary service in Free France (France)
- Croix de Guerre (Croix de Guerre 1939–1945 and Croix de guerre des théâtres d'opérations extérieures. France)
- Escapees' Medal (France)
- Légion d’Honneur (France)
- Médaille militaire (France)
- Order of the Million Elephants and the White Parasol (Kingdom of Laos)
- Resistance Medal (France)

Reddé was also recommended for a Military Cross (United Kingdom), but was appointed a Member of the Order of the British Empire (MBE) in 1946.
