= Suzanne Mertzizen =

French espionage agent

before the war

Suzanne Camille Mertzizen or Mertzisen (15 May 1919 – 18 January 1945) was a French heroine of World War II who served in the Special Operations Executive and was executed by the Nazi government.

She was born Suzanne Boitte in Colombes, a suburb of Paris. In 1938 she married a French airman, Gabriel Mertzisen, and had a daughter. They moved to live in Constantine, Algeria where she joined the "Corps Féminin des Transmissions" (Women's Signal Corps) set up by General Lucien Merlin, and known as "Merlinettes" after their founder. With other recruits Eugénie Djendi, Marie-Louise Cloarec and Pierrette Louin, she was sent for training at Staouéli, near Algiers.

When a call went out for radio specialists all four women volunteered and were sent to London for further training as radio operatives. The course, at St Albans and Manchester, covered such things as parachuting, management of explosives and unarmed combat as well as basic radio transmission. She was given false papers and prepared to be sent back to France as a resistance wireless operator.

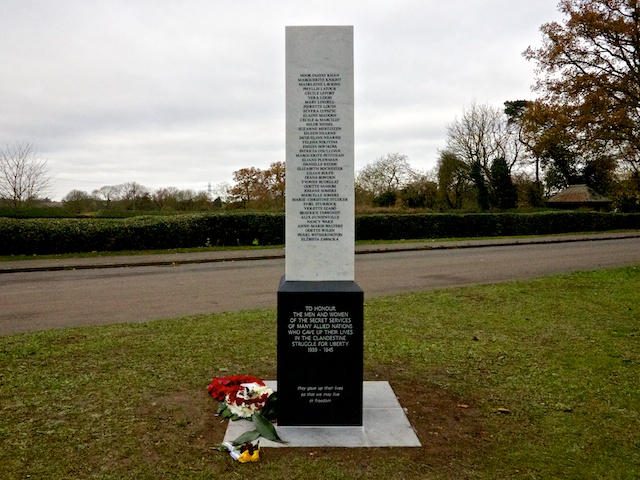
Tempsford memorial

Mertzizen was parachuted at night on 6 April 1944 into the Limoges region of France together with Marie-Louise Cloarec, Pierrette Louin and two others. The three women made their way to Paris to stay with a cousin of Louin.

Her marriage had suffered due to their separation and their divorce was announced on 24 April 1944.

On 27 April they were arrested after a tip-off and they were interrogated by the Gestapo, before being sent in August to Ravensbrück concentration camp, where they discovered Eugénie Djendi. After their demands to be transferred to a Prisoner of War camp were denied, the four women were executed by firing squad on 18 January 1945 and their bodies burnt and buried in the nearby forest.

Mertzizen was declared "Mort pour la France" and posthumously awarded the Medal of the Resistance, the Military Cross and the Chevalier of the Légion d'honneur. She is commemorated with her colleagues on the Tempsford Memorial in Bedfordshire.
