= Jacques Bingen =

French Resistance member

- Born: 16 March 1908; Paris, France
- Died: 12 May 1944 (aged 36); Chamalières, France
- Cause of death: Suicide by cyanide
- Education: École des mines de Paris
- Occupations: Engineer, shipping executive, resistance member
- Known for: Leadership in the French Resistance
- Awards: Ordre de la Libération (posthumous)

Jacques Bingen (16 March 1908 – 12 May 1944) was a high-ranking member of the French Resistance during World War II who, when captured by the Gestapo, chose to commit suicide rather than risk divulging what he knew under torture.

== Early life ==
Bingen was born in Paris to a Jewish family with Italian roots. He was the brother-in-law of André Citroën.

After graduating from the Lycée Janson de Sailly in 1924, he entered the École des mines de Paris in 1926 and studied to become an engineer.

In 1930–1931, he served in the artillery branch of the French Army.

From 1935, he was director of the French shipping company Société Anonyme de Gérance et d'Armement.

== World War II ==
He was drafted in 1939 for World War II. During the Battle of France, he was wounded on 12 June 1940 at Saint-Valery-en-Caux. After France surrendered, he made his way to British-held Gibraltar, and from there to England, arriving in July. He joined the Free French under General Charles de Gaulle, and was put in charge of its merchant marine, the little there was of it. However, Bingen longed to fight more actively for his country.

He resigned on 1 October 1941 and signed up with the Bureau Central de Renseignements et d'Action, the Free French intelligence service, in 1942. On 16 August 1943, he parachuted into France to help organize and unite the various disparate groups that comprised the Resistance. Jean Moulin was the key figure holding together the various Resistance groups. When Moulin was captured on 21 June 1943, there was no obvious person of sufficient stature, acceptable to all the factions, to replace him. As a temporary measure, Claude Bouchinet-Serreulles was placed in charge of the steering committee in the north and Bingen in the south. Pierre Brossolette was sent to France to help settle the unresolved issues after Moulin's death, but he was opposed by both Bingen and Bouchinet-Serreulles. Brossolette and his unpopular choice for Moulin's successor, Émile Bollaert, were captured by the Germans. Bouchinet-Serreulles was recalled, having been undermined by Brossolette supporter André Dewavrin, departing France on 3 March 1944; this left Bingen in charge of the General Delegation of the French Committee of National Liberation. However, Charles de Gaulle replaced him with loyalist Alexandre Parodi.

Bingen played an important role in the creation of the French Forces of the Interior in February 1944.

On 10 May, Bingen left Paris, having been named delegate for the southern zone. The next day, he was betrayed by Belgian double agent Alfred Dormal and captured at Clermont-Ferrand. He managed to escape and hid under a porch, but was betrayed by a woman passerby. On 12 May, he committed suicide at Chamalières by swallowing a capsule of cyanide rather than risk breaking under torture. His body was never found.

== Honors ==
Bingen was awarded the Ordre de la Libération posthumously.

Rue Jacques Bingen, a street in the 17th arrondissement of Paris, is named after him. There is also a Rue Jacques Bingen in Dunkirk. The cargo ship Empire Scepter was given by the British government to the French and renamed Jacques Bingen.

On 21 April 1958, the French post office issued a postage stamp bearing his likeness.
