= Camille Claudel (disambiguation) =

Camille Claudel (1864–1943) was a French sculptor and graphic artist.

Camille Claudel may also refer to:

- Camille Claudel (film), a 1988 French film
- Camille Claudel (musical), a 2003 musical

== See also ==
- Camille Claudel 1915, a 2013 French film
- Claudel, a French surname
