= Eugénie Djendi =

French resistance fighter

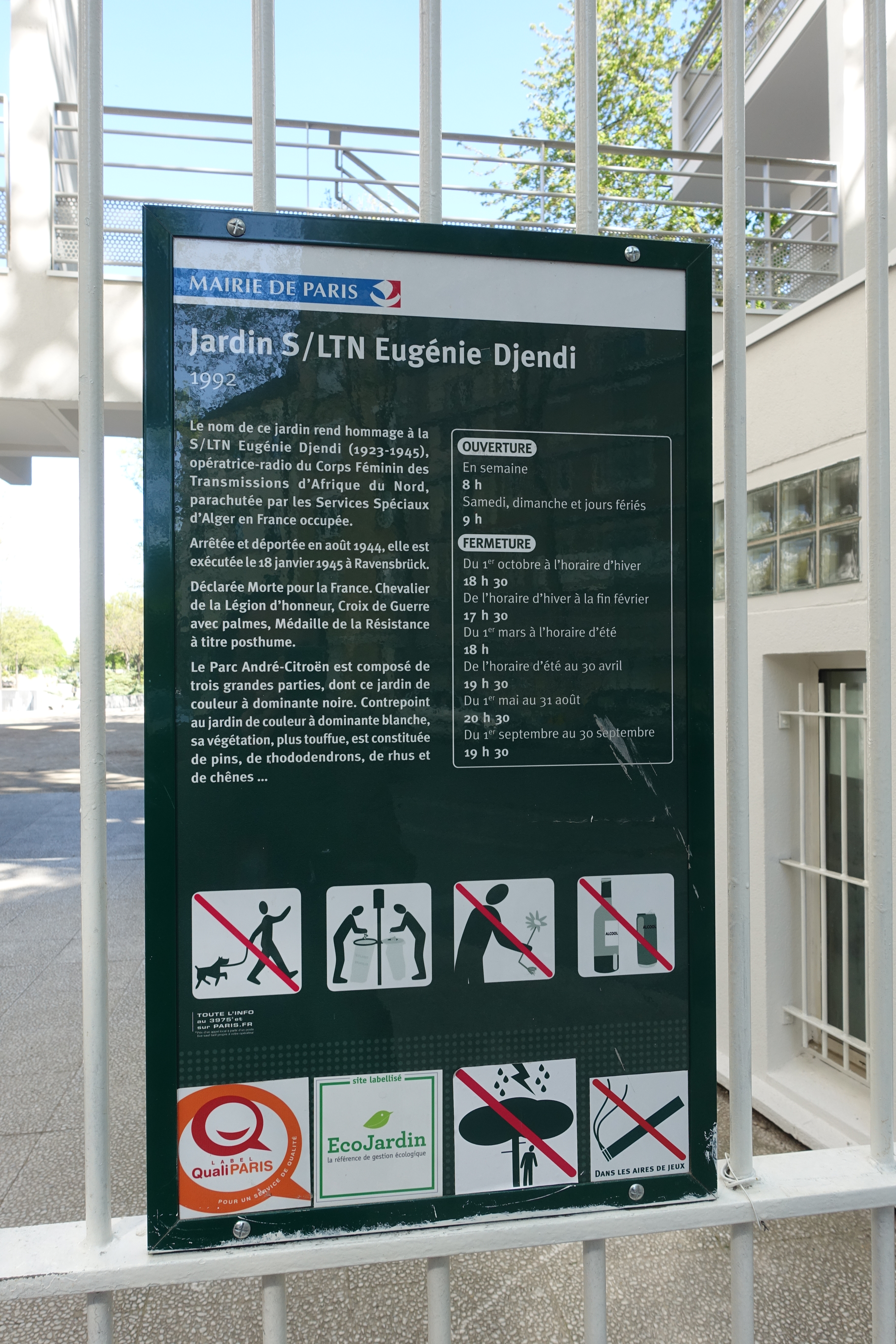
Her memorial garden in Paris

Eugénie Malika Djendi (1918 – 18 January 1945) was a French soldier and resistance fighter during World War II who was executed by the Nazi government.

== Life ==
Djendi was born in 1918 and she lived with her parents in Bône, a former French département in Algeria, where in 1942 she joined the "Corps Féminin des Transmissions" (Women's Signal Corps) set up by General Lucien Merlin, and known as "Merlinettes" after their creator. Other recruits were Marie-Louise Cloarec, Pierrette Louin and Suzanne Mertzizen. All four were sent for training at Staouéli, near Algiers.

When a call went out for radio specialists all four women volunteered and were sent to London for further training as radio operatives by the British. The course, at St Albans and Manchester, covered such things as parachuting, management of explosives and unarmed combat as well as basic radio transmission. She was given false papers in the name of Jacqueline Dubreuil and prepared to be sent back to France as part of Mission Berlin.

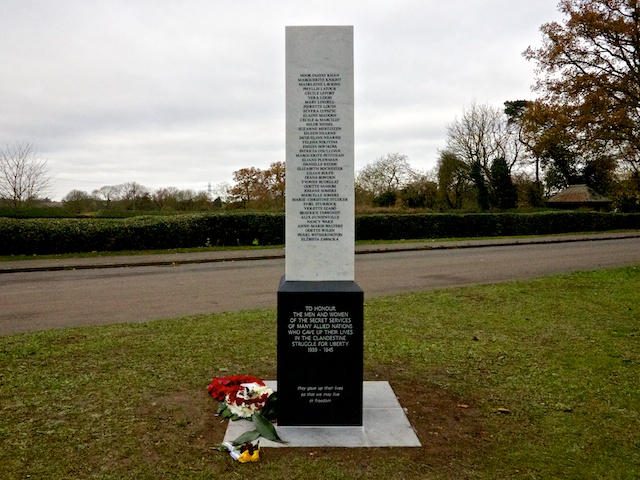
Tempsford memorial

She flew from Tempsford airfield in a Halifax on 9 April 1944 and parachuted with two male colleagues into the area of Sully-sur-Loire, where she established radio contact with London and Algeria. They were arrested by the police the following day in possession of their radio equipment and she was later sent to Ravensbrück concentration camp, where she made contact with fellow operatives Marie-Louise Cloarec, Pierrette Louin and Suzanne Mertzizen who arrived 8 August 1944.

After their demands to be transferred to a Prisoner of War camp were denied, the four women were executed by firing squad on 18 January 1945 and their bodies burnt and buried in the nearby forest.

Djendi was declared "Mort pour la France" and posthumously awarded the Croix de Guerre avec Palme and the Medal of the Resistance. She is commemorated by a garden in Paris (Le jardin Eugénie-Djendi) and her name is inscribed with those of her colleagues on the Tempsford Memorial in Bedfordshire.
