= Pierrette Louin =

French espionage agent

Pierrette Denise Louin (1 October 1920 – 18 January 1945) was a French heroine of World War II who served in the Special Operations Executive and was executed by the Nazi government.

She was born in Oran, Algeria, where she joined the "Corps Féminin des Transmissions" (Women's Signal Corps) set up by General Lucien Merlin, and known as "Merlinettes" after their creator. With other recruits Eugénie Djendi, Marie-Louise Cloarec and Suzanne Mertzizen, she was sent for training at Staouéli, near Algiers.

When a call went out for radio specialists all four women volunteered and were sent to London for further training as radio operatives. The course, at St Albans and Manchester, covered such things as parachuting, management of explosives and unarmed combat as well as basic radio transmission. She was given false papers in the name of Pierrette Salina (her mother's maiden name) and prepared to be sent back to France as a resistance wireless operator.

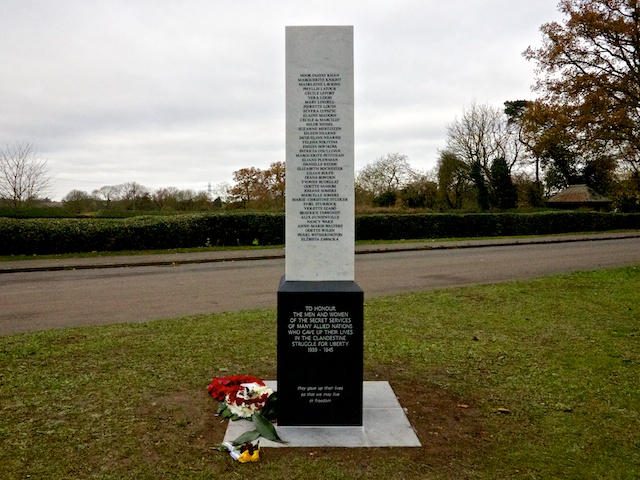
Tempsford memorial

Louin was parachuted at night on 6 April 1944 into the Limoges region of France together with Marie-Louise Cloarec, Suzanne Mertzizen and two others. The three women made their way to Paris to stay with her cousin.

On the 27 April they were arrested and interrogated by the Gestapo, before being sent in August to Ravensbrück concentration camp, where they discovered Eugénie Djendi. After their demands to be transferred to a Prisoner of War camp were denied, the four women were executed by firing squad on 18 January 1945 and their bodies burnt and buried in the nearby forest.

Louin was declared "Mort pour la France" and posthumously awarded the Croix de Guerre avec Palme and the Medal of the Resistance. She is commemorated with her colleagues on the Tempsford Memorial in Bedfordshire and a street in Toulouse has been named after her.
