= Luc Estang =

French writer, critic and publisher

Luc Bastard (pen name: Luc Estang; 1911–1992) was a French writer, critic and publisher.

He was born in Paris and attended boarding schools and Catholic seminaries in Artois and Belgium. He began his writing career in 1929, and published his first newspaper piece in 1933. In 1934, he joined the Catholic daily La Croix as literature and arts critic, and he rose to be its editor-in-chief in 1940.

In 1945 he became a permanent jury member of the Prix Renaudot. In 1955, he quit his position at La Croix, seeking to break through the constraints of being known as "just another Catholic writer", or worse, a Catholic propagandist. He was a friend of renowned Catholic writers such as Mauriac, Bernanos, Claudel and Jouhandeau. He continued to write through personal and professional upheavals, eventually producing some 20 novels. Among his best-known novels are the trilogy called Charges d'Ames (The Cure of Souls, 1949–1954), which has been compared to Roger Peyrefitte's 1945 novel Les Amities particulieres (Special friendships). He was influenced by writers such as Peguy, Mauriac, Bernanos, Alain-Fournier and Saint-Exupery. Notable among his later novels are L'Apostat (1968) and Les Deicides (1980).

Also in 1955, he became a regular contributor to Figaro Litteraire. That same year, he co-founded the literary publishing house Editions du Seuil, where he published French authors such as Julien Green, Renaud Camus, Philippe Sollers, Didier Decoin - many of them for the first time - and foreign writers such as DM Thomas, John Irving, Alexander Zinoviev, William Boyd, Severo Sarduy, Amos Oz, Witold Gombrowicz and Heinrich Boll.

As a poet, he published his first book of verse in 1938, titled Au-dela de moi-meme (Beyond myself). This was followed by the critically acclaimed volume Transhumances (1939). Other works of poetry included Mystere apprivoise (The Mystery Tamed, 1943), La Laisse du Temps (Time on a leash, 1977) and Corps a Coeur (Heart Body, 1982). His last collection, Memorable planete appeared in Gallimard the year before his death.

He was also a broadcasting pioneer, creating serious literary programmes for the radio, notably on France Culture.

He married Suzanne Bouchereau-Boigontier in 1939; the two had a daughter. He died in Paris in 1992.
