= Women's Signal Corps =

Women's Signal Corps may refer to:

- Merlinettes, a World War II unit of the French army known formally as Women's Signal Corps (Corps Féminin des Transmissions).
- Hello Girls, a World War I unit of the U.S. Army Signal Corps known formally as Signal Corps Female Telephone Operators Unit.
