= Merlinettes =

French army Signal Corps unit

Women's Signal Corps
- Corps Féminin des Transmissions
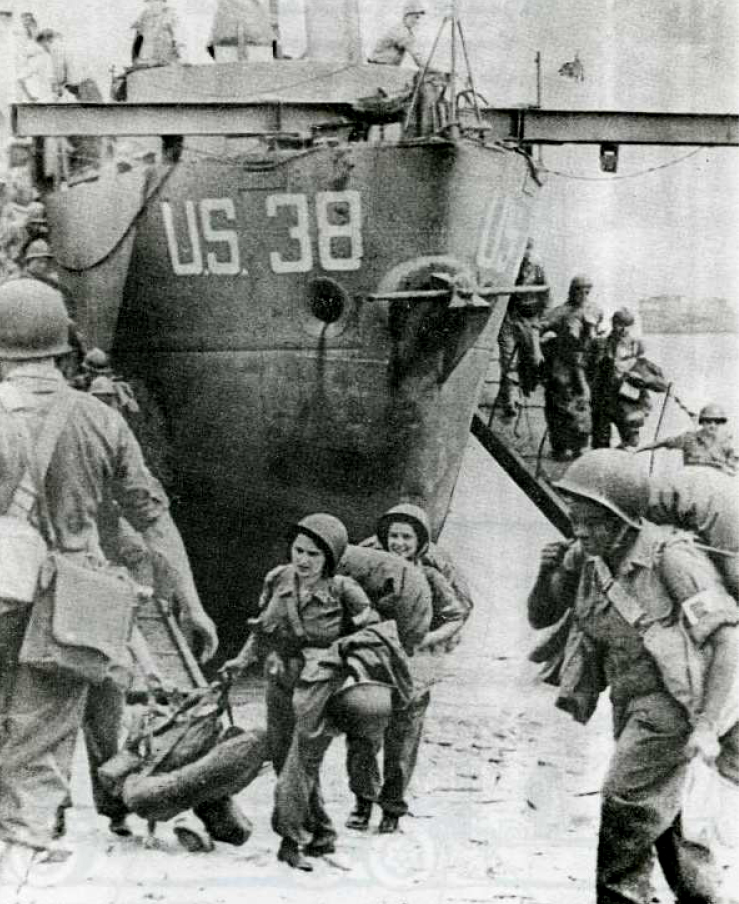
- Merlinettes during Operation Dragoon, the landing in Provence, August 1944
- Active: 1942–45
- Country: France
- Allegiance: Free France
- Branch: Signal Corps
- Size: 1,095 (April 1944)
- Nickname: Merlinettes
- Engagements: World War II; Tunisian campaign; Italian campaign; Operation Dragoon; Allied advance; Battle of the Bulge

Commanders
- Notable commanders: Lucien Merlin

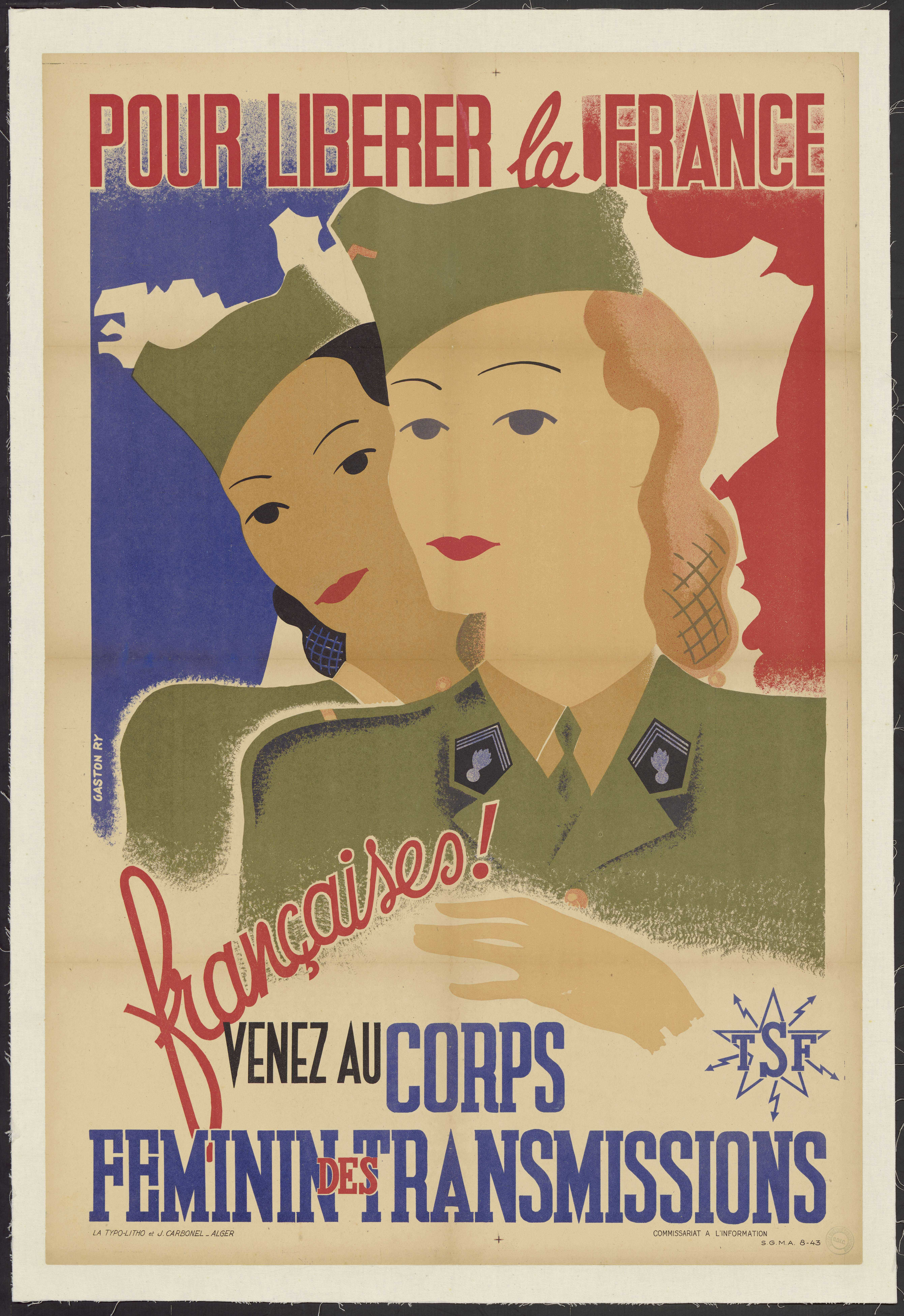
CFT recruitment poster

Merlinettes [mɛʁ.li.nɛt] was the colloquial name given to the women of the Corps Féminin des Transmissions (CFT, "Women's Signal Corps") of the French army during World War II.

The Merlinettes took part in most campaigns of the Liberation of France, from the landing in Provence to the Allied advance from Paris to the Rhine as well as the Italian campaign. Their nickname was derived from Colonel Lucien Merlin, the creator of the corps who formed the unit in French Algeria during the winter of 1942.

In April 1944 about 1,095 women were serving in the Corps reaching a peak by the end of the war of over 2,000. They are considered the first female soldiers of the French army.

== Formation history ==
The corps was formed on 22 November 1942, six months after the establishment of the signals arm under Colonel Lucien Merlin as part of Admiral Giraud's forces in French Algeria. Lucien Merlin proposed to integrate women into the communications service: until then women had been forbidden by law to serve in the army. The candidates were nicknamed Merlinettes, in reference to the founder of the corps.

The C.F.T. was attached to the Service Renseignements et Operations set up within General de Lattre's 1st French Army and trained by the Bureau Central de Renseignements et d'Action. The work of the Merlinettes included telephone operators, signals analysts, teletype and radio operators.

In 1944 they became officially part of Charle de Gaulle's Free French Forces. They took part in most Free French campaigns including the Italian campaign, after landing in Naples as part of the French Expeditionary Corps, and the Allied landing in Provence, Operation Dragoon, following the Allied advance from Paris to the Rhine.

At the beginning of 1944, thirty Merlinettes were sent to London for further commando training with the Special Operations Executive. Eleven were subsequently sent on missions. After being parachuted into France in the spring of 1944, four of them, Suzanne Mertzizen, Marie-Louise Cloarec, Eugénie Djendi and Pierrette Louin, were captured, interrogated and sent to the Ravensbrück concentration camp where they were executed by the Germans on 18 January 1945.

== Commemoration ==
On 13 May 2021, a stele was inaugurated in Le Brugeron to honour radio operators Denise Colin and Suzanne Combelas. The ceremony was attended by military and local officials. That same day the French newspaper Le Monde published an article about the last living Merlinette, Colette Escoffier-Martini.

On 30 September 2017, a stele was inaugurated in Saint-Léger-Magnazeix, by the Association des Amis de la Fondation pour la Mémoire et la Déportation. It commemorates Merlinettes parachuted into the region, including Marie-Louise Cloarec, Pierrette Louin, and Suzanne Mertzizen, who were later captured and deported.

On 6 October 2023, a memorial was unveiled at the Musée Départemental de la Résistance et de la Déportation in Lorris. It honours the Merlinettes involved in clandestine operations in occupied France. The inscription reads "Souviens-toi" ("Remember").

== See also ==
- Suzanne Mertzizen
- Marie-Louise Cloarec
- Eugénie Djendi
- Pierrette Louin
