= Roger Claudel =

French international rugby player

Roger Raymond Claudel
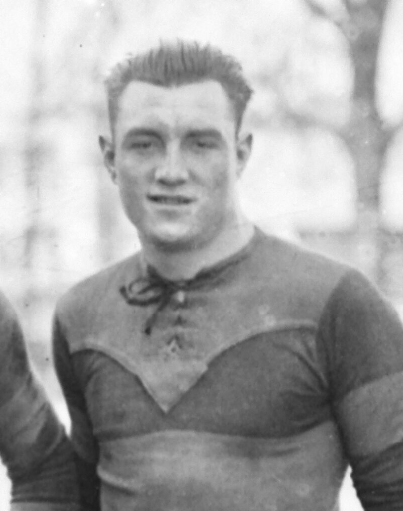
- Roger Claudel in a Lyon O.U. shirt in 1932.

Personal information
- Born: 10 April 1911 Chartres, Eure-et-Loir, France
- Died: 8 December 1944 (aged 33) Rammersmatt, Haut-Rhin, France

Playing information

Rugby union
- Position: Second row
Club
Years	Team	Pld	T	G	FG	P
192?–30	FC Grenoble
1930–34	Lyon OU
1940–42	Racing CF
	Total	0	0	0	0	0
Representative
Years	Team	Pld	T	G	FG	P
1932–34	France	2

Rugby league
- Position: Second-row
Club
Years	Team	Pld	T	G	FG	P
1934–38	Paris Rugby XIII
1939–40	RC Courbevoie
	Total	0	0	0	0	0
Representative
Years	Team	Pld	T	G	FG	P
1934–39	France	4
- Military career
- Allegiance: Free France
- Branch: Free French Army
- Unit: 3rd Moroccan Spahis Regiment
- Conflicts: World War II; Battle of Alsace

Roger Claudel, born on April 10, 1911 in Chartres and mort pour la France (dead for France) on December 8, 1944 in the Rammersmatt region, was a French international rugby union player who played both XV and XIII rugby between 1920 and 1940.

He discovered XV rugby when he moved to Grenoble and joined the FC Grenoble club. The latter joined the Union française de rugby amateur in 1930, leading to the departure of many players, including R. Claudel, who joined Lyon OU. During this period, Lyon OU enjoyed a "golden age", dominating the French Championship, winning titles in 1932 and 1933, as well as the Challenge Yves du Manoir in 1933. R. Claudel was a key figure in the French national team, but the latter was going through a period of turmoil and was excluded from the Five Nations Tournament, making it impossible to organize many international matches and forcing R. Claudel to have only two caps between 1932 and 1934.

The arrival of the rugby XIII code in France in 1934, spearheaded by Jean Galia, seduced R. Claudel, who moved to the capital to join the new Paris rugby XIII club. He played there for four seasons, but the club failed to win any titles and disbanded in 1938, leading R. Claudel to play in the amateur category at Courbevoie for a year in 1938-1939. At the same time, he participated three times in the European Nations Cup - in 1935, 1936 and 1937 - with the French team. In 1939, requisitioning for the Second World War suspended the Championship, before the Vichy regime decided to ban rugby à XIII in France in 1940. R. Claudel vigorously denounced this policy and was forced to return to XV rugby, playing for Racing CF in Paris for two more years between 1940 and 1942.

He then joined the Free French Forces. Incorporated into the 3rd Moroccan Spahis Regiment, he entered Alsace in the winter of 1944. It was there that Roger Claudel was killed, before being awarded the distinction of "mort pour la France".

== Biography ==
=== Childhood, youth and early rugby union in Grenoble ===
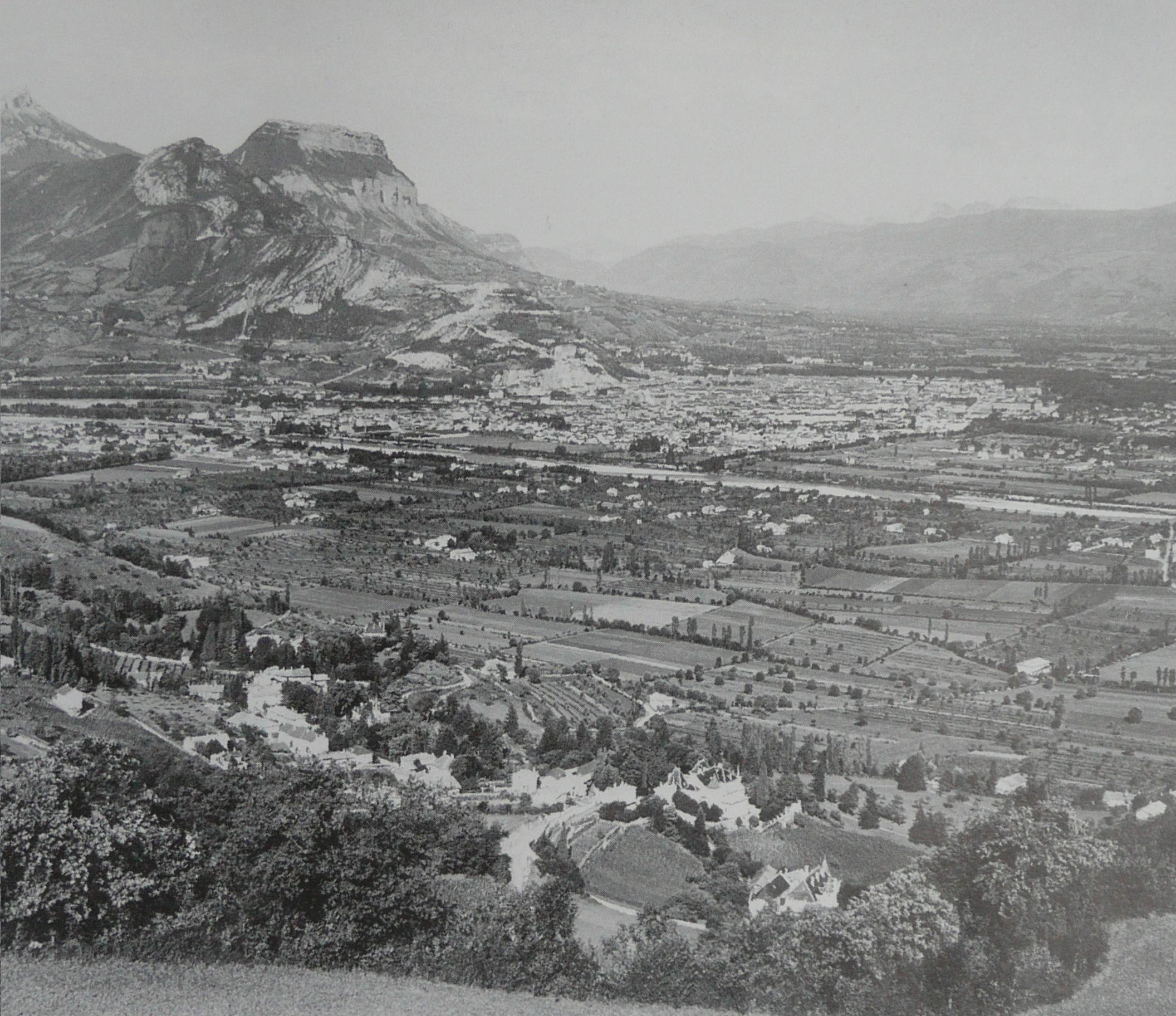
Roger Claudel discovered rugby when he arrived in Grenoble, pictured here in 1929, at the age of 17.

Roger Raymond Claudel was born on April 10, 1911 in Chartres (Eure-et-Loir), at his parents' home at 4 rue Vintant. His father, Henri Albert Claudel (born in Mulhouse in 1882 and died at an unknown date), was a confectioner, and his mother, Émilie Friess (born in Troyes in 1885 and died in Saint-Égrève in 1969), had no profession. He has a sister Émilie (1906-1980) and four brothers Armand (1909-1976), Henri (1903-1992), Émile (1906-1982) and Robert (1914-2005).

He spent his childhood in Alsace with his family, before returning to settle in his hometown. As a youngster, he played athletics and soccer, but was not introduced to rugby union until he moved with his family and four brothers to Grenoble in the late 1920s. Intrigued by the sport, he played it in secret from his parents, who were not keen on the idea. He joined FC Grenoble in 1927 as a reserve player. His qualities were quickly spotted by the Grenoble coaching staff, and during a match against Lyon OU, the Lyon players also recognized his talent.

In 1928, Roger Claudel embarked on a military career. That same 1928-1929 season, he played for the Lyon club, a rugby stronghold.

He joined the 35th aviation regiment in Bron, near Lyon. This choice, through the intermediary of Lyon OU captain Vincent Graule, led R. Claudel to play for the latter club. At the same time, FC Grenoble joined the French amateur rugby union (Union française de rugby amateur), a sports organization bringing together a number of dissident XV rugby clubs. As a result, several players left FC Grenoble, including Julien Saby and later Roger Claudel.

=== Lyon OU star and French international recognition ===
==== 1930-1931: successful first season with a Championship final and a call-up to the French national team ====
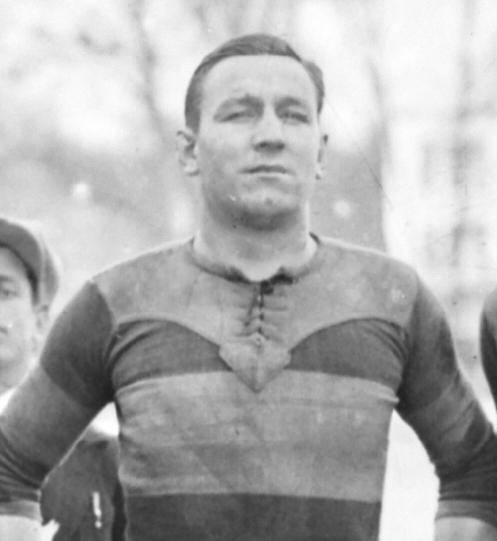
Together with Joseph Griffard, he enjoyed success at club level and with the French national team between 1930 and 1934.

After playing a few friendly matches for Lyon OU during the 1929-1930 season, Roger Claudel signed a permanent contract with the club in the summer of 1930. Roger Claudel's arrival at Lyon OU coincided with the club's rise to prominence on the French scene, recruiting many powerful players from the South of France. The club included Henri Marty, Vincent Graule and Lucien Lafond, among others, in the early 1930s.

Lyon OU enjoyed a particularly brilliant 1931 season. The team emerged from pools of five and three, eliminating CA Villeneuve, AS Bayonne, CA Brive and CASG over throughout the season. At the same time, Roger Claudel was selected for the French army team during the season and even played a match at Twickenham stadium against the English army. In the league, Lyon OU surprised their opponents with R. Claudel in the starting line-up. Having qualified for the Championship quarter-finals, Lyon faced Racing CF in Bordeaux on April 26, 1931. R. Claudel was cited as one of Lyon's top performers, and the match ended in a 7-6 Lyon victory, thanks in particular to its forward pack, in which R. Claudel played alongside Joseph Griffard among others. The Championship semi-final pits Lyon against reigning French champions SU Agen. In Béziers, in front of nearly 8,000 spectators, Lyon's power overcame Agen's speed. Once again, Lyon's forwards were the architects of victory. Roger Claudel, named best forward of the pack for this match, even scored a try to give Lyon an 8-0 lead, before eventually winning 11-8. R. Claudel thus prepared for his first Championship final, in which Lyon OU faced RC Toulon on May 10, 1931 at Bordeaux's Parc Lescure. The final turned out in Toulon's favor, as they won 6-3 thanks to a more powerful scrum, in an indecisive encounter. R. Claudel, despite a temporary expulsion, was seen as the best forward in the Lyon team, and, like his teammates, did not disappoint, and was already being touted as an undisputed international for the seasons to come. At the same time, he learned that he had been selected for the French national team, for its end-of-season training camp in Morocco. A few days after the final, he accompanied the French team on a tour of friendly matches against Moroccan teams, with the aim of developing rugby à XV.

==== 1931-1932: First French Championship title and international recognition ====
By the 1931-1932 season, Lyon OU had become a club to be reckoned with at every match, and was one of the season's leading teams. Roger Claudel, who had been rumored to be joining Stade Châteaurenardais, ended up staying with Lyon. As predicted by the press, he was selected for the French national team in November 1931 to take part in selection matches in Clermont-Ferrand on December 6, 1931 and then in Brive. He was not the only Lyonnais called up, as he was accompanied by Paul Durand and Joseph Griffard.

That season, the French team was excluded from the Five Nations Tournament, preventing R. Claudel from taking part. Only friendly matches were organized, and the only official match of the year took place against Germany in the spring. This took place in Frankfurt on April 17, 1932, between the quarter-finals and semi-finals of the Championship. R. Claudel and his teammate Joseph Griffard were the only two Lyonnais representatives, following several team defections. Germany, for their part, did not seem strong enough to prevent the French from winning. The match turned in the French's favor, and in the second half they relied on the attacks of their forwards to win the match 20-4. Roger Claudel won his first cap and was considered one of the best forwards.

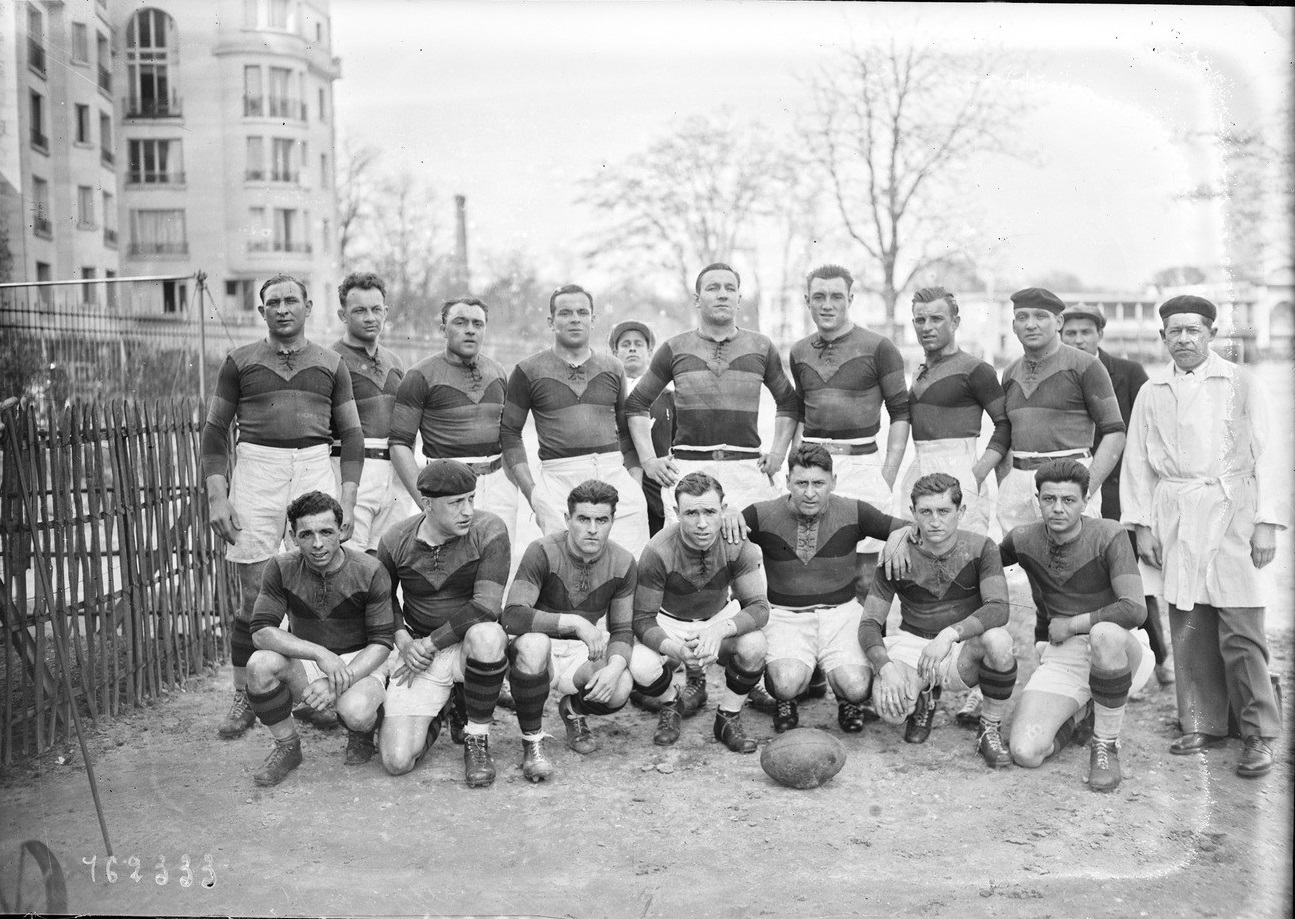
Lyon O.U. XV rugby team in 1932.

In the Championship, Lyon OU beat US Cognac, CA Périgueux, AS Soustons, SC Toulouse, AS Béziers and CA Brive in pools of five and three respectively. In the quarter-finals, Lyon faced SA Bordeaux. Thanks to their more athletic forwards, Lyon quickly got the better of an outmatched Bordeaux side. Roger Claudel was at the forefront of a very active pack with Griffard and Louis Vallin, which gave Bordeaux no chance. The Lyonnais win by a large score of 28-0. The semi-final pitted Lyon OU against Stade Piscenois in Bordeaux. Stade Piscenois, the surprise package of this year's tournament, was in the semi-finals and looking to make a splash. In a hurry, they attacked and pressed the Lyonnais, who counter-attacked at the end of the first half with a try scored by R. Claudel. Each team scored a try in the second half for a final score of 6-3. The Lyonnais thus win thanks to their experience and qualify for their second consecutive Championship final. Captain Joseph Choy's RC Narbonne was their opponent in the final in Bordeaux. Lyon were favourites in view of last season's final and this season's run, but their opponents, Narbonne, had previously eliminated the reigning French champions, RC Toulon. Prior to the match, R. Claudel was cited as one of the men to watch in this final. The final, played in front of almost 13,000 spectators, was a bitter affair between two hostile teams obsessed with the result, with the newspaper L'Auto even describing the game played by the two teams as "detestable rugby". Lyon emerged victorious in a match marred by numerous fouls and expulsions, including Claudel's own. Lyon claimed their first French Championship title with a score of 9-3.

==== 1932-1933: Second French Championship title ====
Roger Claudel and several other Lyon players made the headlines during the off-season for their announced departures, suggesting they might return to FC Grenoble. However, the squad was largely renewed for the 1932-1933 season and the defense of their title. R. Claudel retained his international status at the end of the year, following a meeting of the selection committee, and was in with a chance of playing in the annual match against Germany. He is cited as one of France's best players. In March 1933, he was announced as a member of the French team to face Germany on March 26, 1933, along with his Lyon teammate Griffard, but was ultimately left out of the squad in favor of Henry de Malherbe.

Lyon OU's season was not as successful as the previous one, with a series of defeats. In the Championship, however, the club managed to qualify for the semi-finals in its pool of nine, while RC Toulon (champions in 1931) and Stade Piscénois (semi-finalists in 1932) were in the same pools. In the semi-final phase in April, Lyon OU beat UA Libourne 9-0 in Narbonne, thanks in particular to a decisive pass from R. Claudel to Dugaucher, who went on to score Lyon's last three points. To qualify for the final, Roger Claudel and his team-mates took on Section Paloise in Bordeaux, confident in the knowledge that they had been beaten by Libourne. However, the Section paloise gave the Lyonnais a hard time, losing 8-3 and only saving themselves on the difference between points scored and points won, to beat their opponents from Bordeaux and Libourne, and qualify for their third French Championship final in a row, the second in a row against RC Narbonne. This gave R. Claudel the chance to win his second French Championship title. However, he did not take part in the final, even though he had initially been selected for the match. On the eve of the match, he injured himself in his room, dropping a washbasin on his foot. Despite his absence, Lyon OU retained their title at Bordeaux's Stade Lescure, with a score of 10 - 3. At the same time, Lyon OU competed throughout the season in the Challenge Yves du Manoir, winning the title on May 14, 1933 by beating S.A. Bordelais and remaining unbeaten throughout the competition.

==== 1933-1934: end of Lyon's golden age and second selection for the XV de France ====
Although rumored to be leaving, R. Claudel ended up staying on for another season. In January 1934, there were reports that Claudel and Griffard had been approached by professional rugby league clubs (Trezistes). However, Griffard claimed to have had no contact with these clubs, and Claudel himself expressed skepticism about the establishment of professional clubs in France. He was then called up to the French national team for the annual match against Germany on March 25, 1934, again with his colleague Griffard. R. Claudel was still regarded as France's third row wing par excellence, and his place in the French team seemed guaranteed. This was confirmed in March 1934, with the two Lyonnais on the team sheet. Despite the Germans' obvious progress, France won 13-9 in front of 18,000 spectators. This was R. Claudel's second and last selection for the French national team.

In the French Championship, Lyon OU qualified for the group of three after emerging from the group of nine with AS Montferrand, ahead of Stade Piscenois, FC Grenoble and Stade Aurillacois. In the group of three, Lyon OU were held to a 6-6 defeat by CA Bègles in Clermont-Ferrand, forcing them to play a big game against RC Toulon or risk not qualifying for the Championship semi-finals. April 8, 1934 marked the end of the Lyon OU era, as RC Toulon won the final match 6-4, eliminating the Lyonnais from the Championship.

=== 1934: career change when he joins Paris Rugby XIII and becomes a French international ===
==== A high-level 1934-1935 season ====
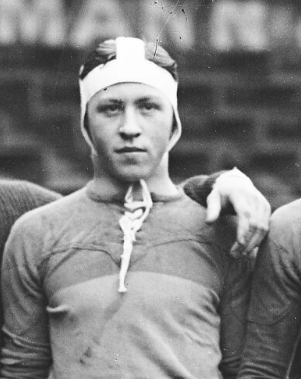
For three years, Roger Claudel and Louis Brané formed the second line for Paris Rugby XIII and the French national team.

The introduction of rugby league (rugby à XIII) to France by former rugby XV international Jean Galia had significant repercussions for the rugby XV scene. In March 1934, a tour of seventeen players to England, dubbed the "Pioneers," attracted many XV players interested in escaping the violence and amateurism associated with rugby XV and pursuing professional rugby. As early as May 1934, rumours and denials appeared in the press announcing the departure of three Lyon OU players for rugby à XIII: Joseph Griffard, Henri Marty and Roger Claudel. This did not prevent the French Rugby XV Federation from selecting R. Claudel, J. Griffard and other Lyonnais such as Pal for a match against Germany at the end of May, in order to promote XV rugby in Switzerland. His departure for rugby league was only delayed.

At the start of the school year in September 1934, R. Claudel signed up for Racing CF in Paris and took part in a number of friendly matches. In October 1934, he was included in the squad of Paris Rugby XIII, managed by M. Boye, for the club's debut in the new French Rugby XIII Championship. Claudel played alongside other prominent former XV players, such as Pierre Germineau and Louis Brané. In November 1934, Galia organized French selections for "propaganda" matches aimed at promoting rugby league and attracting XV rugby players. Claudel was one of the key XV players selected, along with Germineau. In the Championship, Paris Rugby XIII, since joined by Georges Caussarieu, put up a good fight, but failed to challenge for the top places.

In conjunction with the English and Welsh, it was decided to create a new competition between these nations and France, called the European Nations Cup. France was to face Wales in Bordeaux on January 1, 1935. With this in mind, a selection match between thirty players was organized in Perpignan to determine the players selected. R. Claudel was one of the thirty players selected for the match, along with team-mates Germineau and Caussarieu. The match was a real success, played in front of almost 18,000 spectators and a number of celebrities such as the deputy mayor of Bordeaux, Adrien Marquet. France surprised its opponents and recorded the first victory in its history, with a score of 18-11. R. Claudel was cited as one of the best players of the match, described as a "fast forward, capable of playing in the scrum and in the opening".

Recovery in January was complicated for the Parisians. R. Claudel, suffering from a double sprain, like Germineau, was absent for several weeks, leaving the club struggling in the Championship. Then, in February, he missed a training session with the French national team, attended by his team-mates Germineau and Brané, in preparation for the second European Nations Cup match against England, scheduled for March 28, 1935. At the end of February, however, J. Galia restored his faith in the still-injured R. Claudel, selecting him for the team that would face England along with Caussarieu and Brané. He returned to competition and played an active part in Paris' 7-3 victory over Pau XIII in the quarter-finals of the Coupe de France.

R. Claudel starts in the second row against England, alternating with Brané in the second and third rows. The match, held at the Buffalo Stadium near Paris, ended in a 15-15 draw. Although England won the European Cup, France demonstrated its success in building a world-class XIII rugby team in less than a year. R. Claudel and his forwards surprised their English counterparts.

Distanced from the race at the top of the Championship standings, R. Claudel's Paris Rugby XIII and XIII Catalande Perpignan clashed on April 21, 1935 in Toulouse in the semi-finals of the Coupe de France. Both clubs had the ambition to shine in this competition. After a first half controlled by the Catalan XIII, Paris rugby XIII rallied at the start of the second half, with a try from R. Claudel and a comeback, but the Catalans extinguished the Parisians' hopes at the end of the match to win 22-15.

==== 1935-1936: Roger Claudel remains a star, but Paris Rugby XIII takes a back seat ====
Roger Claudel was considered one of the best players in the French Championship. Jean Galia, Max Rousié, and Louis Brané were often cited as the most attractive players, followed closely by Claudel and François Noguères. In a Parisian team that underwent few changes during the off-season, R. Claudel and his partners seemed limited in their ability to compete for the top spots, despite the few talented players in his squad. In the selection match to determine the team that would face Wales on November 23, 1935, R. Claudel was one of the first-choice players, and nothing seemed to call this choice into question. He was even nominated to captain the team, which ultimately failed.

For this match, played in Wales, the Welsh team wanted to avenge their defeat by France in the previous European Cup. The French have a few absentees, but are confident. R. Claudel is placed in the second row alongside Brané. In the end, the French team misses their match and is beaten 41-7. R. Claudel and his forwards were blamed for the rout, as the Welsh "outrageously" dominated the scrum.

In the Championship, Paris Rugby XIII with R. Claudel remained stuck in the middle of the standings, struggling with Dax XIII and Pau XIII with a mid-season jolt as Agen XIII withdrew after a few matches. They can't compete with Bordeaux XIII, Côte Basque XIII and SA Villeneuve. For the second match in this edition of the European Cup, scheduled for February 16, 1936 against England, a selection match took place at the end of December 1935 in Lyon. R. Claudel was selected, but lost his place in the French squad and joined the "Rest" team. Louis Galia preferred to recall Charles Petit, a member of the Pioneers, and Joseph Griffard. In the end, R. Claudel declined the invitation due to injuries, many of which occurred during a season in which he was not spared. He did, however, pay tribute to his team-mates, including Griffard, after their 25-7 defeat by England in February 1936, saying that "they didn't defend themselves too badly" in the face of such adversity. In the Coupe de France, Paris Rugby XIII was eliminated in the quarter-finals by Bordeaux XIII in early March. In the Championnat, the club was also eliminated in the quarter-finals. Against RC Roanne, they had to do without Brané, who was injured during the match, and were beaten 19-13. R. Claudel is cited as one of the leading players in Paris.

==== 1936-1937: Roger Claudel retains international status, but Paris Rugby XIII fails to take off ====
Roger Claudel began his third season with Paris Rugby XIII, joining his international teammates Pierre Germineau and Louis Brané. In mid-November 1936, he was selected for the selection match to determine the French team that would face Wales on December 6, 1936, with Jean Galia hesitating between him and Maurice Brunetaud. In the end, Galia innovated by appointing Max Rousié to the third row for this international match, as he couldn't imagine doing without Rousié, leaving out M. Brunetaud and R. Claudel. At the same time, his club, Paris rugby XIII, after a series of defeats, waited until the beginning of December for its first victory in the Championship, beating Bordeaux XIII, and by the end of December was in eighth place in the Championship, a team for which R. Claudel sometimes took over the captaincy. In mid-February, Paris Rugby XIII lost in the first round of the Coupe de France to US Lyon-Villeurbanne in a fair match played with 12 men against 13, following Labourdette's injury. In the Championnat, Paris Rugby XIII remained stuck in last place, finishing the season in ninth place at the beginning of April.

Meanwhile, in March 1937, the French national team took on a team called the Dominions. Jean Duhau was preferred to R. Claudel for this match, but his performance did not satisfy Galia, who decided to recall R. Claudel for a fourth selection in view of the second European Nations Cup match against England. R. Claudel appeared weakened by a sore throat, but held his place. On April 10, 1937, in Halifax, France led 9-7 at half-time, but Robert Samatan's permanent withdrawal through injury precipitated a 23-9 defeat. Brunetaud was named France's best player of the game, but R. Claudel was described as "very skilful but a bit scrappy".

==== 1937-1938: Roger Claudel's last season with Paris Rugby XIII ====
At the start of the 1937-1938 season, Paris Rugby XIII was enjoying its fourth season in the top flight. Roger Claudel, full captain, and Germineau are still present, leading the group in their capacity as international. At the start of the season, R. Claudel and Germineau were dropped from the French squad by coach Jean Galia, who preferred to rely on larger players such as André Bruzy, Charles Petit, Joseph Griffard, André Rousse and Maurice Brunetaud to face the British teams. Despite this non-selection, R. Claudel expressed his encouragement and insisted on the mental qualities his selection team-mates would have to demonstrate.

In November 1937, R. Claudel relinquished his position as captain of Paris Rugby XIII, leaving Ribeyre to take on the role due to personal considerations. However, he made it clear that his desire to play was not in question, and that he intended to take part in all the matches. At the same time, his name was mentioned in connection with Australia's tour of Europe in January 1938. Galia, in fact, called on him again for the selection match in December 1937, when he was the only Parisian called up and presented himself as a candidate for a new selection, despite a strong hesitation with the Basque Coast club's third row Justin Davant. Although he was tipped to captain the French team, R. Claudel was forced to withdraw, having recovered badly from a contusion, and gave way to Davant. The name of Roger Claudel, back from injury, reappeared in the debate for the second match on January 16, 1938, but this time Galia decided in favor of Brunetaud.

In the Championship, Paris Rugby XIII fought for a top-eight finish to qualify for the quarter-finals. However, the season was marred by injuries for Claudel, which frequently kept him off the field. He returned at the end of the season to help his club qualify for the final stages. The battle turned in favor of Toulouse Olympique XIII, who took the coveted eighth place, with the Parisian club eventually finishing ninth. R. Claudel and his team-mates hoped to exact revenge in the last 16 of the Coupe de France, but were also defeated 19-7 by the same opponents on March 27, 1938, in Lyon.

==== 1938-1939: end of Paris Rugby XIII, Roger Claudel continues as an amateur at Courbevoie ====
Paris Rugby XIII disappeared from the professional rugby map for the 1938-1939 season. Many of the players who made up the Paris team joined amateur clubs in the surrounding area, such as RC Courbevoie, which Roger Claudel chose to join. R. Claudel and Courbevoie were one of the attractions of this amateur championship, which was also contested by Saintes, Nantes, Stade Rochelais, Celtic Saint-Denis and Castres. In terms of results, RC Courbevoie was eliminated from the Coupe de France by professional Bordeaux XIII 30-13, and lost the final of the Coupe de France Amateur to Saint-Gaudens 9-3 in Brive.

In the amateur championship, RC Courbevoie progressed through the competition by eliminating Castres, Carpentras, Saintes, and Celtic Saint-Denis. However, they were eventually defeated in the semi-finals by Saintes.

=== Roger Claudel during the Second World War ===
==== The end of rugby competitions and the beginnings of the ban on rugby à XIII ====
France’s entry into the Second World War halted many competitions and led to the requisitioning of numerous players. Roger Claudel served at an air base, alongside Léopold Fabre and Marcel Baillette. He was demobilized in August 1940 and returned to Paris.

He took a stand against the Vichy regime's desire to ban rugby in France, a decision supported by Jean Ybarnégaray, Jean Borotra and Joseph Pascot. In response to the latter's accusations, R. Claudel, in his capacity as an international in both rugby XV and rugby XIII, criticizes the inconsistency of this decision for the facts of professionalism applied to rugby XIII and not to soccer; he also points to his background: after having been a professional, he played as an amateur in Courbevoie. Lastly, he points out that the French Rugby League requires every treiziste to have a professional situation outside their sporting activity. He adds that this forced merger is to the detriment of XIII rugby, and points out that he was only taught the basic principles of rugby in XIII, despite having played XV rugby for six years. Finally, he points out that XIII rugby provides much better coaching and instruction in tackling techniques, attacking, skill and breath. René Arotça, a former rugby XV international who had also moved to rugby XIII, supported Claudel’s position.

==== 1940-1942: return to XV rugby and integration into Racing CF ====
With XIII banned, R. Claudel joined the capital's XV rugby club, Racing CF, in November 1940, not forgetting to denounce the brown amateurism he had experienced in XV rugby, with sums far higher than those received in XIII rugby.

He played for the Paris club for two seasons. He remained a benchmark in his second-row position, and was even selected for regional teams in Paris, but was overlooked for the 1941 National Cup final, Jean Blond of the Stade Français being preferred in the "Nord" selection. He then took a six-month break from rugby to rest and practice his profession, only to return at the end of 1941, still wearing the Racing CF jersey. He was even named man of the match in the Racing-Stade Français derby in January 1942. In October 1942, he took part in a match celebrating the tenth anniversary of Lyon OU's victory over their counterparts from the 1932 season, USA Perpignan.

==== Enlistment in the Free French Forces ====
In February 1943, Claudel faced compulsory military service in Germany. He decided to cross over to Spain, before joining the Free French Forces. He subsequently joined the 3rd Moroccan Spahi Regiment, which accompanied the Leclerc division [Information dubious]. Entering the Alsace front in December 1944, he was killed in action, "on the turret of his tank", on December 8, 1944 in the Vosges mountains, near Rammersmatt (Haut-Rhin). He was posthumously declared "mort pour la France".

== See also ==
- FC Grenoble rugby club
