= Claudell =

Claudell may refer to:

- Claudell, Kansas, U.S.
- Claudell Harris Jr. (born 2002), American basketball player
- Claudell Washington (1954–2020), American baseball player

== See also ==
- Claudel, surname
