= Sarkis Bedikian =

French Resistance fighter (1908–1944)

- Born: c. 1908; Zeitoun, Ottoman Empire
- Died: 21 August 1944 (aged 35–36); Marseille, France
- Other name: Sarkis Bedoukian
- Military career
- Allegiance: France
- Branch: French Resistance
- Unit: Compagnie Marat
- Conflicts: World War II; Battle of Marseille †

Sarkis Bedikian (Armenian: Սարգիս Պետիկեան; 1908 – 21 August 1944), also known as Sarkis Bedoukian, was a French Resistance fighter of Armenian descent. Born in Zeitoun, Ottoman Empire, he moved to France in the wake of the Armenian genocide and resided in Marseille. During World War II, he joined the FTP-MOI and was killed in the Battle of Marseille, designated as mort pour la France posthumously.

== Youth and settlement in Marseille ==
Sarkis Bedikian was born in Zeitoun, Ottoman Empire, around 1908. He settled in France after the Armenian genocide. Marseille was a preferred destination for Armenian refugees, who mostly arrived by sea from the Middle East.

Bedikian settled in Traverse Chevalier in the 10th arrondissement of Marseille.

== Resistance and death ==
During World War II, Bedikian joined the Francs-tireurs et partisans – main-d'œuvre immigrée (FTP-MOI) and specifically served in the Compagnie Marat, a detachment in Bouches-du-Rhône. In this group, many Armenians found themselves, including others morts pour la France, such as Azad Niguerresian, Nechan Dermardirossian, Edmon Perian, Samoue Topalian, and Veravant Kechikian.

As the Allied invasion of Provence began with Operation Dragoon, the FTP-MOI in Bouches-du-Rhône rose up militarily to capture strongholds, create chaos in the defensive lines of Nazi Germany, and facilitate the successful landing. Sarkis Bedikian was among the uprising fighters. On 21 August 1944, Julia Pirotte photographed him alongside one of his Greek comrades, Vassilias Stamboulis.

A few hours later, Sarkis Bedikian was killed in combat while launching an assault on the prefecture of Bouches-du-Rhône. Edmon Perian, Samoue Topalian, and Veravant Kechikian were also killed in Marseille during the Battle of Marseille.

== Legacy ==
Bedikian was recognised as being mort pour la France. Additionally, his detachment was renamed Detachment Sarkis in his honour.

He is one of the characters in the 2009 novel Missak by Didier Daeninckx about Missak Manouchian.
