= British Memorial School =

Address
- Elverdingsestraat 1, 8900; Ypres; Belgium

Information
- Other name: Eton Memorial School
- Religious affiliation(s): Church of England
- Opened: 8 April 1929
- Status: Closed
- Closed: May 1940
- Headmaster: Harry Morris (1929-1933), William Allen (1933-1937), John Clifford Yorath (1937-1940)
- Gender: Mixed
- Education system: British Curriculum
- Language: English
- Houses: Plumer (green), Pulteney (red)
- Annual tuition: 150 Belgian Francs

The British Memorial School was established in 1929 in Ypres, Belgium. It was founded by former students of Eton College for the children of Imperial War Graves Commission employees.

== Early years (1929-1933) ==
The school opened on 8 April 1929 with an initial enrolment of 62 children. One of the organisers, Lieutenant General Sir William Pulteney, stated that the school had been built 'because it was believed that these British subjects, unless educated at an English school, would be lost to England'.

The schoolroom contained a plaque bearing the names of the 342 Etonians who died in the Ypres Salient during the First World War. Beneath it was the inscription -

This school is a memorial of those whose names are written above. It was built by their brother Etonians in the year 1928 in grateful remembrance

The school's annual report of 1929 stated that four of the children understood English fluently when it opened. The Times reported that the children 'were all now receiving an English education and were being brought up as British citizens, to the intense relief of their parents'. The eighth annual report published in 1937 mentioned of the 17 new pupils seven spoke no English at all. Although the reports add that teachers found the children were able to learn English quickly. The report of 1939 stated with regard to language that 'the school enforced rigidly the rule that no language but English might be used in school time'.

Prior to the British school, the children attended local Belgian schools. The Times reported that this meant, 'they can neither learn their native language nor keep in touch with their national Church'.

The school was built by Etonians at a cost of £2,000 with the promise of £200 towards its upkeep.

London County Council lent two teachers to the venture, Harry and Kathleen Morris. The school was founded on 'modern lines' with individual desks and chairs for each child. The War Graves Commission arranged for children from outlying areas to access the facility by omnibus and tram. Dr. Nan Roberts of the War Graves Commission also gave the children regular health checks.

Parents paid 150 Belgian Francs a year, the same as they would pay to a Belgian school. An appeal was launched to the public schools of Britain to fund the £10 per head annual cost of each child's schooling. The school needed £800 a year to cover its expenses, such as teacher's pay.

In August 1929 the school was educating 43 boys and 33 girls. This rose to 93 children by October 1929 with a further 16 turned away due to lack of resources. Honorary Secretary of the school Lieutenant-General Sir William Pulteney appealed for donations to help meet the demand for places. King George V took out a £20 annual subscription in support of the school. A sizable donation was made by Sir Charles Wakefield of £500. It was Sir Charles who was the driving force in the preservation of 'Lone Tree Crater' at Spanbroekmolen. The crater left by a British mine was to be preserved as a 'pool of peace'. A further £500 was given annually by the War Graves Commission.

June 1930 saw a prize giving ceremony with the school building's architect Sir Reginald Blomfield as guest of honour. It was reported in the Ypres Times that he told the children -

...to remember always those men to whose memory the school has been built, and to copy their ideals of courage and unselfishness. They should always strive to cultivate the quality of true British sportsmanship - not merely skill, but the will to do their level best for their team. They were very fortunate, living in a foreign country, to have a real British School, and they should try always to show the best qualities of the race to which they belong.

— Sir Reginald Blomfield

The school's fourth annual report, published in 1933 reported a school population of 110. New pupils came from Poperinghe which previously had not sent any children. The children at the school are described as 'definitely British'. With the use of a foreign language in the playground 'the exception rather than the rule'.

== Middle years (1933-1937) ==
The Morris' four-year posting to the school ended in 1933, and they were replaced by William and Florence Allen who were accompanied by their daughter Barbara.

Allen, taking inspiration from British public schools, introduced a school uniform and two school houses. They were Plumer (green) and Pulteney (red) and the houses competed for cup at the end of the year. Red buttons were awarded to students for their achievements and counted towards the total of their respective houses. The school also appointed students as 'Elders' (prefects) and a School Captain from the senior class.

The uniform consisted of gymslips and white shantung blouses for the girls and for the boys, grey trousers, green jerseys with yellow trim and a BMS cap badge (with a Union Flag added to the badge by the following headmaster). Boys were also expected to raise their caps to adult friends when outside the school.

To help give a sense of Britishness to the children, British celebratory days were marked. May Day was marked in the traditional way with dancing around a Maypole and a May Queen elected by ballot. A major occasion at the school was the celebration of Empire Day. The children would gather as the Union Flag was hoisted in the school yard and patriotic songs were sung. Lilly Boucher, a former pupil recalled -

On Empire Day we used to go outside and sing. The Belgian people used to watch out of their windows. The first song was always "Land of Hope and Glory". Father [William Boucher, IWGC Nurseryman] and Mother were there and I will never forget as long as I live, we were singing "Land of Hope and Glory" and great tears were coming down my father's face. I can see it now.

— Lilly Boucher

The annual report of 1936 reported the installation of a 'wireless set' which the school regarded as 'a link with home'. The children listened to major British events such as the King's Proclamation and the sailing of the Queen Mary. The report also told of the passing of M. R. James, the Provost of Eton, who had been a trustee since the school's founding.

In 1937 the Allen's four-year term ended, and they were replaced by John Clifford Yorath and his wife Victoria.

The Times of 8 February 1939 reported that the King of the Belgians, Leopold III, presented a signed photograph of himself to the school.

== Second World War and afterward ==
With the outbreak of the Second World War the school decided to remain open for as long as possible during the conflict.

Following the German Invasion of Belgium, the Imperial War Graves Commission Deputy Controller, Captain Reginald Haworth gave the order for staff to evacuate on 18 May 1940. The evacuation order contained the instruction 'it is quite useless to get excited. Remain calm under all circumstances'.

Some former pupils rendered distinguished service in the Second World War. These included Elaine Madden who served with the Special Operations Executive (SOE), Stephen Grady who led a French Resistance group at 16 and Jerry Eaton who was a highly decorated fighter pilot.

After the war, few British families returned to Ypres. Due to the lack of children it was decided that the school would not reopen. The school became a social club for British Legion members and War Graves Commission staff.
