= Berthe Hirsch =

French Jewish resistance fighter

Berthe Hirsch (born Berthe Weyl, 16 May 1907, Strasbourg – 23 November 1943, Auschwitz) was a French Jewish resistance fighter, deported with her husband Sigismond Hirsch in convoy no. 62. Her husband survived, but she did not. Their son Jean-Raphaël Hirsch is France's youngest member of the Resistance.

== Biography ==
Berthe Weyl was born on 16 May 1907 in Strasbourg to Lucie Strauss. The latter died at the age of 30 while Berthe Weyl was still a child. She became a social worker at the Hospitalières-Saint-Gervais elementary school in Paris's 4th arrondissement (the Pletzl) and at the dispensary on rue des Deux-Ponts, also in the 4th arrondissement.

She joined the Resistance in Paris in 1941, working as an intelligence officer for the Armée Volontaire. In 1942, she and her husband joined the Éclaireuses et éclaireurs israélites de France in Moissac, a house run by her sister-in-law Shatta Simon and her husband, which sheltered many Jewish children. During their time there, the couple helped hide the children from the Nazis with Catholic families (nearly 400 in the Auvillar area).

On 18 October 1943, after someone denounced her, she was arrested by the Gestapo in Saint-Michel, Tarn-et-Garonne. Interned at Drancy, she was deported to Auschwitz with her husband on convoy No. 62 on 20 November 1943.

== Honors ==
- Médaille militaire
- Croix de guerre 1939–1945 à titre posthume
- Médaille de la Résistance française à titre posthume (décret du 23 juillet 1965)
- Reconnue « Morte pour la France »

== Hommage ==
On 4 July 2019 the maternal and child protection center, located at 2 to 6 rue de Moussy in the 4th arrondissement of Paris, was inaugurated in the name of Berthe Hirsch.

== See also ==
- Sigismond Hirsch
- Résistance juive en France
- Maison des enfants de Moissac
- Convoi n° 62 du 20 novembre 1943
- Jean-Raphaël Hirsch
- Yaël Hirsch

== Bibliography ==
- Serge Klarsfeld. Le Mémorial de la déportation des Juifs de France. Paris, 1978. Nouvelle édition, mise à jour, avec une liste alphabétique des noms.FFDJF (Fils et filles de déportés juifs de France), 2012.
- Jean-Raphaël Hirsch. Réveille-toi papa, c'est fini !. Préface de Boris Cyrulnik, Albin Michel, 2014.
