= Cicely Lefort =

WAAF officer and British SOE agent

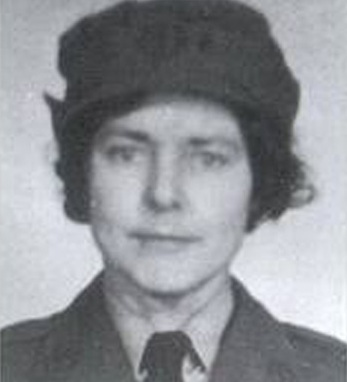
- Cicely Margot Lefort
- Born: 30 April 1899; London, England
- Died: February 1945 (aged 45); Ravensbrück concentration camp, Germany
- Military career
- Allegiance: United Kingdom
- Branch: Women's Auxiliary Air Force (1941–42); Special Operations Executive (1942–45)
- Service years: 1941–1945
- Nicknames: Alice, Teacher, Cecile Marguerite Legrand
- Units: Jockey
- Conflicts: Second World War
- Awards: Mentioned in Despatches; Croix de Guerre (France)

Lefort worked mostly in Drôme Department for the Jockey network.

Cicely Margot Lefort (née Gordon, 30 April 1899 – February 1945) served in the Women's Auxiliary Air Force (WAAF) and in France for the United Kingdom's clandestine Special Operations Executive (SOE) during the Second World War. The purpose of SOE was to conduct espionage, sabotage and reconnaissance in occupied Europe against the Axis powers, especially Nazi Germany. SOE agents allied themselves with French Resistance groups and supplied them with weapons and equipment parachuted in from England.

Lefort arrived in France in June 1943 and was a courier, code named "Alice", for SOE's Jockey network (or circuit). She was arrested by the Gestapo in September 1943 and deported to Ravensbrück concentration camp, where she was later executed.

== Early life ==
Cicely Margot Gordon (often mistakenly called "Cecily") was born in London on 30 April 1899 to Margaret Humble Close Gordon (Lefort gave a decoy maiden name – "MacKenzie" – when she joined SOE). Although married to Christian Frederic Gordon, her mother claimed Cicely's father was her husband's older cousin Lord Granville Gordon with whom she was in love. Subsequently, Cicely became the centre of a notorious paternity suit, which resulted in her mother fleeing and taking her to France rather than relinquishing custody. Growing up in France, Lefort joined the French nursing corps during World War One. While serving as a nurse's aid, she met her future husband, Dr Ernest Marie Alix Lefort, a soldier and patient in her hospital. They married on 17 June 1924 and resided in an apartment in Paris and a villa near the fishing village of St. Cast along the north coast of Brittany, France. A sportswoman, Lefort enjoyed horseback riding and sailing yachts. An acquaintance recalled that Lefort "had a lot of class ...[was] very smart and cultivated ...[with] friends in high society".

== Espionage service ==
In 1939, Alix Lefort was called up for service in the French army as a medical officer. After the fall of France and at his urging, Lefort escaped to Great Britain via Jersey Island, to avoid arrest as a British National, while her husband remained in France. Later, Lefort spoke with SOE's Naval officer Captain Peter Harratt and arranged for her villa in Brittany, which possessed a secure, hidden bay to be made available to the SOE. The villa became part of the Var escape line run by SOE agent Erwin Deman, which enabled nearly 70 men and women to enter and to exit occupied France without capture.

In June 1941, Lefort joined the British Women's Auxiliary Air Force as Aircraft Woman #452845 and served as a policewoman. Her fluency in French brought her to the attention of the SOE, and in January 1943, she volunteered to be a field agent with the F Section (France) of the Special Operations Executive based in London. Lefort was subsequently seconded to the First Aid Nursing Yeomanry (FANY). As women serving in the British armed services were barred by statute from armed combat, there was, according to Sarah Helm, "no legal authority for servicewomen to carry out the kind of guerilla work SOE had in mind." Consequently, women agents were also seconded as members of the FANY, which as a civilian organization was not subject to either armed forces rules or statutes. In February 1943, Lefort began her training at Wanborough House as a field agent. Her training reports were mixed. One Instructor, Lieutenant Tongue, wrote: "This student looks vague; mixed quite well; is interested in the course and could be relied on to be loyal but doubt if she has enough initiative to achieve much." At the next level of instruction, L/Cpl Gordon reported: "Very ladylike, very English in spite of French background, has a wide circle of friends amongst quite well known and influential people, politicians, gens du monde, artists of the Salon School, all very respectable. Inclined to blurt out things in a rather embarrassing way, which she probably would not have said if she thought first." In May, she received appointment to an Honorary Commission of Assistant Section Officer in the WAAF.

=== France ===
On the night of 16 June 1943, with fellow SOE agents Diana Rowden and Noor Inayat Khan, she was flown to a landing field in the Loire Valley where they were met by Henri Dericourt. The assistant F Section Head, Vera Atkins, worried about Lefort's poor French accent and Rowden's English looks. The Lysander pilot, Bunny Rymills, also felt Lefort's French "didn't seem that hot." Her field name was "Alice," her operational codename was "Teacher," and her cover name was "Cecile Marguerite Legrand".

Upon arrival in France, Lefort took a seven-mile bicycle ride to the village of Angers and then caught a train to Paris and then took another to Montelimar where she would serve as courier for the "Jockey network" run by Francis Cammaerts. Geographically, Jockey extended down the left bank of the Rhone between Vienne and Aries and eastwards to the Isere Valley along the Mediterranean north to Lyon and across the Swiss and Italian borders. As his courier, Cammaerts noted that Lefort "conducted various missions, [collected] information to be sent secretly to London, [looked] for dropping grounds for supplying arms and explosives, [acted as] courier, etc". With the Allied invasion of Sicily in July 1943, the Jockey network received more supplies and increased its sabotage of railway lines, power stations and other industrial targets. During a large air drop on 13 August 1943, Lefort was responsible for bringing the plane over the zone and carrying the principal light on the ground to help the pilot locate the drop zone. Her leader, Francis Cammaerts, commented that Lefort "was very shy and I think too frail for this hard work she very courageously carried out".

=== Arrest, imprisonment and death ===
The increase in sabotage activities drew greater German attention to the Jockey area, and Cammaerts warned the circuit to be very careful and avoid areas such as his former headquarters in Montelimar. Stuck late at night and ignoring the warning, Lefort and the Jockey Circuit sabotage instructor, Pierre Reynaud, on 15 September 1943, went to the home of Raymond Daujat, the local resistance leader in Montelimar. Possibly tipped off, the Gestapo sent some SS men to the house to arrest whoever was there; Reynaud and Daujat escaped while Lefort was arrested hiding in the cellar. Cammaerts, very security conscious, was incensed about Lefort's mistake that led to her capture. Her arrest forced him to disperse his network, immediately relocating himself and his associates to safer places in anticipation that Lefort might reveal secrets to the Germans under interrogation or torture. He would later say that she "ought never to have been sent to France."

Lefort was sent first to a prison in Lyon and then north to the Fresnes prison south of Paris where she was brutally interrogated. On 1 February 1944, Lefort was deported to Ravensbruck concentration camp with several hundred other women and while on the trip dropped a note to her husband saying: "Left for Germany, in the convoy of women. Good health, good morale. Warn the Red Cross to send shoes, warm clothes, and food". In the summer of 1944, Lefort sent another message to her husband, giving Ravensbruck as her address, which he duly passed on to the SOE. Lefort arrived at the camp on 3 February, was given the prison number 27.962 and a stitched red political triangle on her prison clothes. While imprisoned, Lefort was discovered to have had either stomach cancer or stomach ulcers, and was successfully operated on by the camp Doctor, Percival Treite. Lefort subsequently "thrived" on a thick porridge and vegetable soup in Treite's belief this would cure her. Upon her return to the main camp, Lefort – along with other prisoners – was made to do hard labour, and by January 1945, she was suffering from extreme malnutrition, diarrhoea and exhaustion.

In early 1945, Lefort volunteered for transfer to the Uckermark death complex, believing rumors that it was for sick prisoners with better medical facilities, no work requirement and no morning roll call. Located approximately one half-mile from the main camp, Uckermark was the former youth detention camp or Jugendlager, and was converted into an extermination center under the supervision of SS-Obersturmführer Johann Schwarzhuber – the recently arrived deputy commandant of Ravensbrück. A fellow inmate, Sylvia Salvesen, recalled Lefort approaching her about the transfer and wanting her approval: "She blurted all this out in a rush, nervous and excited. Her eyes were terror-stricken and she was nervous of my answer." Despite Salvesen's warning, Lefort and two other English prisoners, Mary O'Shaughnessy and Mary Young went to the camp. Another British inmate nurse, Mary Lindell De Moncy, told Atkins that she had sent recall messages to the three Englishwomen to return to the main camp, but while O'Shaughnessy did so, Lefort refused to leave Young, who was in a very bad condition. According to O'Shaughnessy, sometime in February 1945, Lefort's name was called out from a selection list during a morning roll and was taken away to be gassed. She and the other prisoners were placed in trucks and transported to the main camp (Ravensbrück) where prisoners were gassed in groups of about 150.

After the war, Dr. Lefort, Atkins and civil and legal authorities questioned several witnesses in an unsuccessful attempt to establish a precise date for Lefort's death. Consequently, Lloyd's of London, the official executor of Lefort's will, accepted the date of 1 May 1945 for "official purposes as the date of her presumed death."

== Aftermath ==
Three other female members of the SOE were executed by either shooting or hanging at Ravensbrück in February 1945: Denise Bloch, Lilian Rolfe, and Violette Szabo. Lefort was among 12 female British SOE F-Section agents who were executed at concentration camps. The War Office describes their deaths as Killed in Action.

Schwarzhuber was convicted by the British at the Hamburg Ravensbrück trials. He was hanged by Albert Pierrepoint in Hameln prison on 3 May 1947.

== Honours ==
In September 1945, Major General Colin Gubbins, Head of SOE, recommended that Lefort be appointed a Member of the Order of the British Empire (MBE):

This officer (C.M. Lefort) was landed in France by aircraft in June 1943 as courier to an important circuit in the South East. She worked with tireless energy and devotion for three months, often in conditions of grave danger and rendered valuable assistance to her commanding officer. She travelled (sic) extensively throughout South Eastern France carrying messages to the various groups of the organization and showed great coolness and presence of mind in passing many police controls.

On 10 September 1943, S/O LEFORT was arrested by the Gestapo. Although severely interrogated and ill-treated she gave no vital information away. She was last heard of in a concentration camp in Germany, and is still missing.

For her courage, perseverance and devotion to duty it is recommended that this officer be appointed a Member of the Order of the British Empire (Military Division)

Lefort was Mentioned in Despatches for her services on 13 June 1946 and honoured by the government of France with a posthumous Croix de Guerre on 14 January 1948. She is listed on the Runnymede Memorial in Surrey, England, the Tempsford Memorial close to RAF Tempsford, and on the "Roll of Honor" on the Valençay SOE Memorial in Valençay, France. she is also listed on the FANY memorial at St Paul's Church, Knightsbridge, London and on a memorial plaque to the four executed SOE agents at Ravensbruck concentration Camp.
