= Deuxième Bureau =

French intelligence agency (1871–1940)

Agency overview
- Formed: 1871
- Dissolved: 1940
- Headquarters: France

The Deuxième Bureau de l'État-major général ("Second Bureau of the General Staff") was France's external military intelligence agency from 1871 to 1940. It was dissolved together with the Third Republic upon the armistice with Germany. However, the term "Deuxième Bureau" (French: [døzjɛm byʁo]) outlived the original organization as a general label for the country's intelligence service.

French military intelligence consisted of two separate bureaus prior to World War II. The Premier Bureau was charged with informing the high command about the state of French, allied and friendly troops, while the Deuxième Bureau developed intelligence concerning enemy troops. The Deuxième Bureau was celebrated for its cryptanalytical work, but it was criticized for its involvement in the Dreyfus affair and its consistent overestimation of German military formations prior to World War II.

Its final director was Colonel Louis Rivet.

== History ==
=== 19th century ===
On June 8, 1871, the French Ministry of War authorized the creation of a service charged with performing "research on enemy plans and operations". The creation of a reworked Etat Major Général (or General Staff) came in response to the French loss in the Franco-Prussian War and acknowledgment of poor military planning structures in preparation for those hostilities. The EMG was then divided into two bureaus–the first, consisting of civilians, was more of a directorial or leadership branch, charged with general correspondence, troop movements, decorations and decrees, and the second, or the Deuxième Bureau (further subdivided into five sections), was charged with military statistics, archival and historical work, geodesy and topography. This entire structure would be replaced three years later by a reworked general staff, even more similar to the Prussian one in terms of command structure.

In March 1874, the high command was reorganized again, replacing the original two bureaus with six smaller sections. As part of the reorganization, the new Deuxième Bureau, called "Statistique militaire - Bureau historique," took up the activities that would include intelligence collection.

In 1876, a Statistiques et de reconnaissances militaires ("Military Statistics and Recognition") section was added to the Deuxième Bureau.

In 1886, a law was passed penalizing espionage activity (another would be passed in 1934).

In October 1894 the Dreyfus affair occurred and proved so politically divisive that, in May 1899, the government shifted responsibility for counter-espionage to the Ministry of the Interior. A small intelligence section remained within the General Staff, but the Service de surveillance du territoire (Territorial Surveillance Service, SST), an agency of the Sûreté générale, became responsible for the pursuit of foreign spies on French soil. Counter-espionage was to be handled by special Sûreté police chiefs. The Deuxième Bureau's statistical section remained in operation until 1 September 1899, when it was disbanded.

The name (literally, Second Desk) refers to the organization of the French general staff in four desks: 1st for personnel, 2nd for intelligence, 3rd for operations, 4th for logistics. This numerical designation survives in the first four staff numbers of the continental staff system practiced by most NATO armies: S1 for personnel, S2 for intelligence, S3 for operations, S4 for logistics. (See also the French version of this page.)

=== 1900s–1920 ===
In 1906, Georges Clemenceau became Président du Conseil. With complete control of Interior Ministry funding, he created special counter-espionage units, the "brigades du Tigre", a reference to Clemenceau's nickname. Commanded by police commissioner Célestin Hennion, the mobile brigades were to handle special operations of the judicial police related to counter-espionage.

In February 1907, the Deuxième Bureau was reactivated and was reassigned some of the contre-espionnage responsibilities it had had prior to the Dreyfus affair. Commanded by General Charles-Joseph Dupont, the Deuxième Bureau worked with the Interior Ministry, and especially Commissioner Hennion's mobile counter-espionage brigades, which worked closely with France's border patrols.

In August 1911, the oversight of counter-espionage activities was assigned to the administration of the judiciary police that supervised the mobile brigades. In 1913, the government officially assigned counter-espionage operations on foreign soil to the Ministry of War, with the Ministry of the Interior being responsible for border security and prosecution.

In May 1915, the Section de Centralisation du Renseignement ("Central Intelligence Section", SCR) was created and assigned to Commandant Ladoux. It was attached to the 2ème Bureau, which also administered the operations of the Bureaux centraux de renseignement (BCR). Altogether the organization was known as the 5ème Bureau. The SCR was attached to the Section de renseignements (Intelligence Section, SR) in April 1917.

In February 1917, the Président du Conseil put a commissioner of the Sûreté Nationale in charge of the criminal police, general intelligence, and counter-espionage. His command included a filing and archiving section, a section devoted to propaganda (propagande révolutionnaire, PR) and the SR and SCR. The SR provided a clearinghouse for centralized intelligence-gathering while the SCR was a small team of specialized counter-intelligence officers reporting to the Ministry of War, while a team of police officers were in charge of the arrest of suspects and judicial enquiries.

=== 1930s ===
In April 1934, the Direction Générale de la Sûreté Générale was changed to the Direction Générale de la Sûreté nationale, with a post of Controller-General in command of Counter-Intelligence. In March 1935, the position was given authority over the territorial police, the Police de l'Air, the TSF and the police carrier pigeon service.

In June 1936, Colonel Louis Rivet succeeded Colonel Roux as head of the intelligence service and of a new organization, the Service de centralisation des renseignements ("Central Intelligence Service", SCR). The SCR, headquartered at 2 bis avenue de Tourville, Paris, was run by Commandant Guy Schlesser.

In March 1937, the government decreed that territorial surveillance was the responsibility of the police alone, to be executed by strictly legal means. A new organization, the Bureau central de Renseignements ("Central Intelligence Bureau", BCR) was established the same month and a special section devoted to "preventative defence" was created within the SCR.

In July 1939, at the prompting of military intelligence, a counter-intelligence charter was established and the National Council amended the penal code (article 75 and following) to integrate all 1810, 1886, and 1934 counter-intelligence laws.

== Directors ==
- Colonel Jean Sandherr, between 1886 and 1895
- Colonel Georges Picquart, between 1895 and 1896
- Colonel Hubert-Joseph Henry, from 1897 to 1898
- Colonel Charles Joseph Dupont from 1911 to 1917
- Colonel Léon Edmond de Cointet from 1917
- Colonel Maurice-Henri Gauché, from 1937 to 1940
- Colonel Louis Rivet, from 1940

== 20th century operations and agents ==
The Deuxième Bureau developed a reputation as Europe's top cryptoanalytical service in the early 20th century. It scored a notable success at the outbreak of World War I when it cracked the German diplomatic cryptographic system. The French cryptoanalysts were able to decipher the lengthy telegram containing the German declaration of war before the German Ambassador in Paris could decipher it.

In June 1918, Captain Georges Painvin, a DB cryptoanalyst, was able to crack part of the Germans' ADFGVX cipher.

These intercepts allowed an effective response to the movements of the German Army's 15 division-strong advances under Ludendorff at Montdidier and Compiègne, about 50 miles north of Paris.

Prior to World War II, a Deuxième Bureau agent codenamed 'Rex' made contact with Hans-Thilo Schmidt, a German cipher clerk, in the Grand Hotel of the Belgian town of Verviers. Schmidt, who worked at Defence Ministry Cipher Office in Berlin, sold the French the manuals explaining how to operate the top secret Enigma cipher machine being used by the German Army. Schmidt ultimately provided all the information necessary to crack the complex ciphers, which would play a key role in the Allied victory.

In September 1939, when France declared war on Germany in response to Germany's invasion of Poland, Josephine Baker was recruited by the Bureau and provided them with information as an "honorable correspondent".

Raymond Arthur Schuhl, a French propagandist who had served in the 6th Section of the Deuxieme Bureau until the fall of France, became the OSS Chief of Morale Operations in Switzerland and was its principal forger through the war. Schuhl operated for the OSS under the cover name Robert Salembier (code name "Mutt"). He oversaw a prolific print shop in Geneva that produced millions of white and black pamphlets, leaflets, cards, postage stamps, and other forms of printed propaganda.

== World War II reorganization ==
Following the defeat of France in 1940, the Vichy France regime's intelligence service was organized within the Centre d'information gouvernemental (CIG), under the direction of Admiral François Darlan. Under the command of Colonel Louis Rivet, head of the Deuxième Bureau since 1936, they set up the Bureau des Menées Antinationales (BMA, the "Bureau of Anti-national Activities"), officially an organization opposing Communist activities and resistance efforts and accepted by the Germans under the terms of the armistice.

Meanwhile, on 1 July 1940, the Free French government-in-exile in London created its own intelligence service. Under the leadership of General Charles de Gaulle, Major André Dewavrin was assigned to command the organization. Initially known as the Service de Renseignements (SR), the agency changed its name to Bureau Central de Renseignements et d'Action Militaire (BCRAM) in April 1941, and again in January 1942 to Bureau Central de Renseignements et d'Action (BCRA) the name by which it was best known.

At the end of the war, in 1945, this became the modern French counter-espionage service, the Service de documentation extérieure et de contre-espionnage (SDECE, "Foreign Documentation and Counter-Espionage Service").
