= Charles Hainchelin =

French historian and teacher (1901–1944)

Charles Hainchelin (2 August 1901 – 26 August 1944) was a French historian, teacher, communist activist and resistance fighter.

== Biography ==
The son of a teacher and trade unionist who died in the Battle of Verdun in 1916, Charles Hainchelin was adopted by an orphanage and entered the teacher training school, which he left in 1920 to take his first post in Reims. Despite very fragile health and tuberculosis from which he struggled to recover, he managed to obtain a degree in history, which allowed him to obtain a teaching position at the upper primary school of Nancy in 1926.

Hainchelin was a member Communist Party since 1921 and as a convinced Marxist intellectual he collaborated with numerous journals linked to the party or the syndicalist movement throughout the 1920s and 30s, most notably La Vie Ouvrière, Clarté, L'École emancipée, l'Université syndicaliste, Commune (under the pseudonym Chassagne), Regards etc. At the time of the occupation of the Ruhr, Hainchelin, who spoke German fluently, crossed the border to transport leaflets and brochures. He spent fourteen years in Lorraine, devoting himself, in addition to his teaching, to the study of Marxism and history. He assembled an important Marxist library and entered into correspondence with numerous intellectuals. Being also a fluent speaker of Russian, he became a correspondent of the Marx-Engels Institute in Moscow.

From 1932, he was very active in the magazine La Lutte, edited by Louis Aragon, Jean Baby and his friend Georges Sadoul. The magazine essentially centered on a Marxist approach to free thought. Being interested in the subject of the Marxist approach to religion, in 1934 he published his first book, Les origines de la religion (The Origins of Religion), under the pseudonym Lucien Henry. He signed with the same pseudonym an anthology of Marx and Engels “On Religion” which he had himself translated to French in the collection “The great texts of Marxism”. In 1939 he participated in the creation of the magazine La Pensée.

He was writing a vast history of the counter-revolution but this was hampered by the outbreak of war. An underground communist activist after the dissolution of the party, he was mobilized from April to July 1940, without taking part in the fighting.

Hainchelin was assigned to the national professional school of Thiers, to replace Michel Bloch, who was Jewish origin. There he participated in the resistance, and entered the Francs-tireurs et partisans network at the end of 1942. He was killed in action during the clashes for the liberation of the town of Thiers in August 1944, assassinated by ambushing militiamen as he advanced to parley with the Germans who were about to surrender.

After his death, Georges Sadoul published Hainchelin's work on the francs-tireurs and produced several new editions of his work on the origins of religion.

== Publications ==
- Les origines de la religion, Éditions sociales internationales, 1935 (sous le pseudonyme de Lucien Henry), réédité sous son nom (Charles Hainchelin), éditions sociales, Paris, 1956 (préface de Georges Sadoul)
- Sur la religion / Karl Marx, Friedrich Engel; textes choisis, traduits et présentés par Lucien Henry, Éditions sociales internationales, 1936
- Le Japon contre le monde, Éditions sociales internationales, 1938 (sous le pseudonyme d'Henri Chassagne)
- Coblence 1789-1792: Des Français au service de l'étranger, Éditions sociales internationales, 1939 (sous le pseudonyme d'Henri Chassagne)
- Les Francs-Tireurs dans l'histoire de France, Éditions France d'abord, 1945

== Awards ==
- Resistance Medal
- Croix de Guerre 1939–1945
- Mort pour la France
