= Direction générale des études et recherches =

French intelligence service

The Direction générale des études et recherches (English: General Directorate for Studies and Research, DGSS), was the successor of Direction générale des Services spéciaux (English: Directorate General of Special Services, DGSS). It was created in 1944, and Jacques Soustelle was the first director, from 6 November 1944 to 18 April 1945, followed by André Dewavrin until April 1946, when the DGER became the Service de documentation extérieure et de contre-espionnage (SDECE).
