= Claudel =

Claudel is a French surname. Notable people with the name include:

- Aurélie Claudel (born 1980), French model and actress
- Camille Claudel (1864–1943), French sculptor and graphic artist
- Henri Claudel (1871–1956), French general
- Paul Claudel (1868–1955), French poet and diplomat
- Philippe Claudel (born 1962), French writer and film director
- Roger Claudel (1911–1944), French international rugby player
- Véronique Claudel (born 1966), French biathlete

== See also ==
- Claudell (disambiguation)
