= Rammersmatt =

Commune in Grand Est, France

- Commune
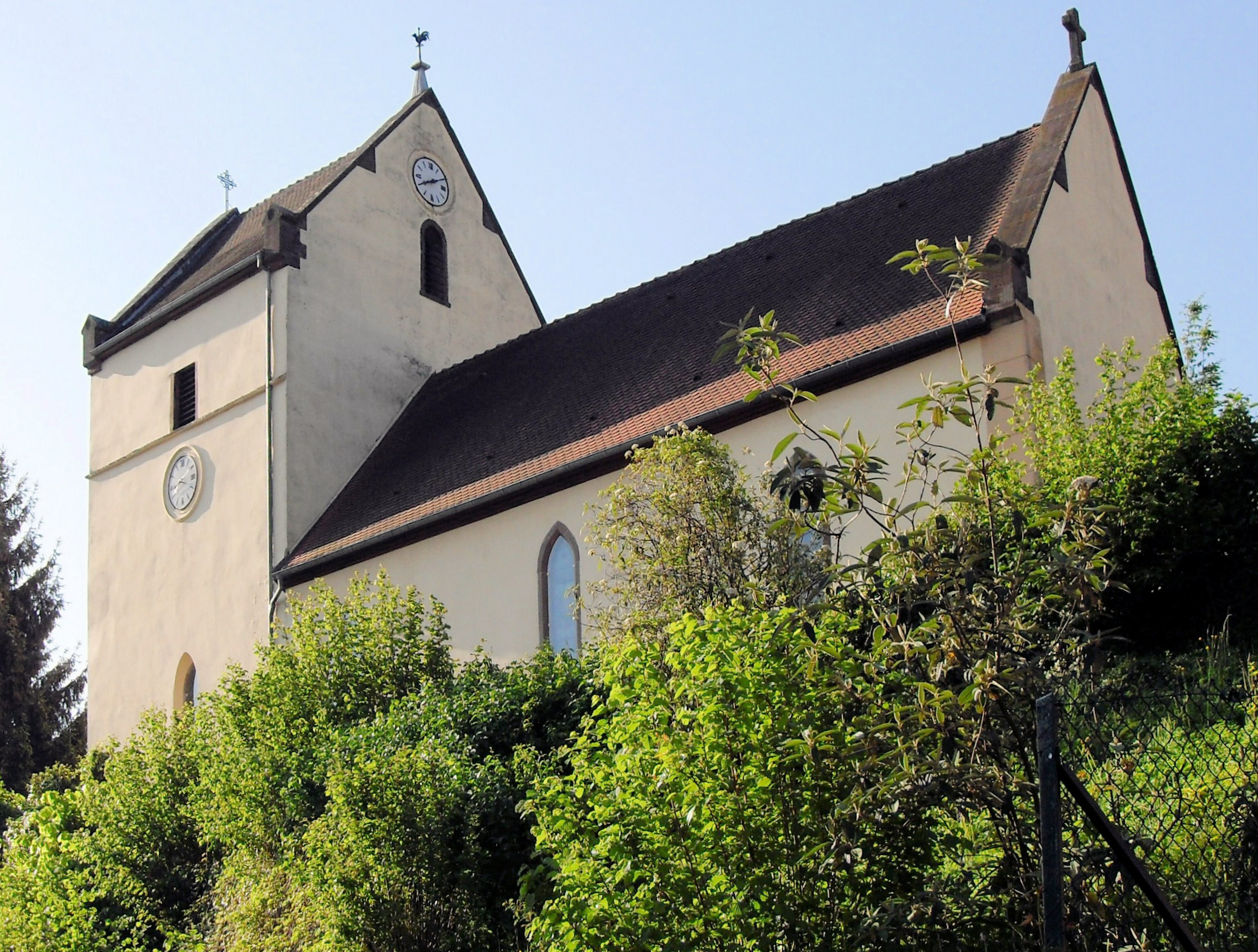
- The church in Rammersmatt

- Coat of arms
- Location of Rammersmatt
- Location within France Location within Grand Est
- Coordinates: 47°47′24″N 7°04′14″E
- Country: France
- Region: Grand Est
- Department: Haut-Rhin
- Arrondissement: Thann-Guebwiller
- Canton: Cernay

Government
  - Mayor (2020–2026): Benoît Haagen
- Area^{1}: 5.47 km^{2} (2.11 sq mi)
- Elevation: 550 m (1,800 ft)
- Highest elevation: 883 m (2,897 ft)
- Lowest elevation: 414 m (1,358 ft)
- Population (2023): 219
  - Density: 40.0/km^{2} (104/sq mi)
- Time zone: UTC+01:00 (CET)
  - Summer (DST): UTC+02:00 (CEST)
- INSEE/Postal code: 68261 /68800
- ^{1} French Land Register data, which excludes lakes, ponds, glaciers > 1 km^{2} (0.386 sq mi or 247 acres) and river estuaries.

Rammersmatt (French pronunciation: [ʁaməʁsmat]) is a commune in the Haut-Rhin department in Grand Est in north-eastern France.

== Heraldry ==
Rammerstatt	Argent, a rose gules, seeded or, pointed, leaved and stalked vert; issuant from three hillocks gules.

== See also ==
- Communes of the Haut-Rhin department
