= Elaine Madden =

Belgian-British SOE agent (1923–2012)

- Born: 7 May 1923; Poperinghe, Belgium
- Died: 2012 (aged 88–89); Pont-Saint-Esprit, France
- Military career
- Allegiance: United Kingdom
- Branch: Women's Voluntary Service; Auxiliary Territorial Service Special Operations Executive; Special Allied Airborne Reconnaissance Force
- Service years: 1944–1945
- Unit: T Section
- Conflicts: Second World War
- Awards: Croix de Guerre (Belgium); Mentioned in Despatches (UK)

Elaine Marie Madden aka Meeus, aka Iomgen (7 May 1923 – 2012) was a Belgian-born British agent of the Special Operations Executive during the Second World War. She was born in Poperinghe, Belgium, and attended the British Memorial School in Ypres. She died in 2012 in Pont-Saint-Esprit, France.

== Early life ==
Elaine was born to a Belgian mother, Caroline Duponselle, and an Australian father, Larry Madden, who was employed by the Imperial War Graves Commission. Elaine was the couple's only child. Her mother was 32 and died of septicaemia after a miscarriage when Elaine was nine or ten.

Her father Larry's drinking, already a problem, was worsened by the loss of his wife. His work ended with the war graves commission in March 1932, although records don't say if he left or was dismissed. Elaine remembers him saying, "I don't want her [Elaine], she looks too much like her mother". Later, after continuing in a spiral of drinking and gambling the Duponselle family paid for Larry to go to Britain where he joined the army and Elaine lost touch with him. Following her father's rejection, Elaine was sent to live with her grandparents in Poperinghe. They owned the Palace Hotel on the Rue d' Ypres in the town. She was initially schooled at the British Memorial School in Ypres but her grandparents sent away to school at a boarding convent. There she had to wear a uniform of thick black stockings and an ankle length tunic. After only a few weeks there Elaine took a pair of scissors to her uniform, cutting the tunic knee length and stockings at the ankles. After this act of rebellion the convent asked her grandparents to remove her from the school and she re-joined the British school at Ypres. In her senior year at the school Elaine was appointed an 'Elder' which was a school prefect.

Elaine became aware that her Belgian family cared for her out of obligation rather than choice. At the age of 16 she was pleased to get out to London where she attended secretarial college. However, on a Christmas visit to Poperinghe a quarrel erupted between her grandmother and Uncle Charles regarding Elaine's education. Upset at this Elaine said she wouldn't go back to college, the family wouldn't have to pay for her any further.

== Second World War ==
=== The Battle of Belgium and Evacuation ===
At the age of 17, Elaine was engaged to Belgian officer Edgar Callant. However, her life in Belgium was disrupted when the Second World War spread to the country with the German Invasion of France, Belgium and the Netherlands. Together with her 19 year old Aunt, Simone Duponselle, she set off for the coast where the pair took part in the Dunkirk evacuation. Sheltering in a barn they were discovered by three British soldiers, Knocker, Smudger and Gary. Although another source has the soldiers passing them in a car and offering a lift. The five made their way to Dunkirk together. Elaine recalled, "When we got to Dunkirk about 11pm, the whole place was on fire. I’ve never seen anything like it, even in films. I thought my last moment had come.” Knocker and Smudger gave the women their great coats and tin helmets to disguise them as soldiers. The three men stood around them to help Elaine and Simone blend in. Gary told them, "Say you're the Dorsets, if you're challenged". Elaine remembered they wore "greatcoats, tin hats, gas masks, everything except the trousers”. The women were spotted when climbing down a rope ladder into a trawler, given away when their legs were noticed. However, the captain gave them his cabin when she said she was English. Upon reaching the United Kingdom Elaine stayed with her aunt in Streatham.

=== The London Blitz ===
After arriving in Britain Elaine found work as a clerk for the British Relay Wireless Company while lodging at a flat near Fleet Street in London. Her nights were spent with the Women's Voluntary Service (WVS) assisting Air Raid Precautions (ARP) personnel searching bombed out buildings for survivors during the London Blitz. This work led her to study for her Red Cross certificates in Home Nursing and First Aid as she wanted to be of more practical assistance to casualties. Recalling the period Elaine said -

I don't know why I wasn't more scared of the Blitz. I used to walk around in it and even when I was off-duty I'd take flasks of tea out to the firefighters. Some people would say, 'Wait till it's quietened down, there are still bombs out there', but I'd say, 'Not to worry, if one has my name on it, OK, well, then I go.' So the Blitz didn't scare me much but those stupid little butterfly bombs-they looked like tin cans with wings and they used to get stuck in the trees and could fall on you and explode-they scared the life out of me. Of course sometimes you had to leave people who were dead or too badly injured to be helped-that was quite horrific. But I wasn't scared.

— Elaine Madden

=== Special Operations Executive (SOE) ===
At the start of 1944 Elaine was twenty and living in Bayswater with a flatmate, Susan. Initially Elaine was called up for service with the Auxiliary Territorial Service (ATS). However, with three languages and her knowledge of Belgium she felt she could be of greater service. Elaine mentioned her desire to be of greater service to an American officer who took the flatmates to lunch from time to time. He arranged a meeting for her at the American Embassy where a man was recruiting personnel for 'unspecified secret operations'. As she was British he said he would have to clear it with them in case they wanted to recruit her. The British did want her and after meeting with "some people in south London" she was recruited by the Special Operations Executive (SOE). There she became a member of the Belgian section.

After being vetted she was sent to Lillywhites department store in Piccadilly to collect her First Aid Nursing Yeomanry (FANY) uniform. The FANY were the traditional cover for female SOE agents. In April 1944 she went to the Students' Assessment Board (SAB) in Cranleigh, Surrey. There she was given the cover name of Elaine Meeus (she was also known as Imogen and Alice) with different names again on her false papers. The course leader gave this assessment of Elaine:

This girl has a good intelligence, a confident manner, has a good imagination and is capable of taking decisive action... and there is no doubt about her disinterested desire to help the Belgian cause. She is neither a leader nor an organiser, but she is alert, efficient and methodical. At the same time, she is not above being helpless and feminine when the chance presents itself. She is sophisticated for her age and... her consciousness of her powers to attract is not likely to interfere with her application to the task in hand.

— Students' Assessment Board Report

After undergoing further training Elaine parachuted back into Belgium in August 1944, one of only two women parachutists sent to the country. Madden was tasked with gathering intelligence on the V1 and V2 rocket launch sites. Her other mission was to protect and arrange the escape to Britain of Prince Charles of Belgium. Elaine acted as the "eyes, ears and legs" as courier for the experienced agent André Wendelen. The other member of the team was wireless operator Jacques Van de Spiegel. Madden had close shaves in her work, including being given a lift by a German officer while carrying a radio receiver. On another occasion, one she described as the only time she “had trouble of any kind”, she had to lose someone following her.

Remembering this period, Elaine said -

I found the work much easier than I anticipated....the only regret I have, is not having arrived sooner and being able to work more for Belgium was overrun before anything could happen.

— Elaine Madden

She was in Brussels on 3 September when the city was liberated and joined the celebrations. At one stage she and Wendelen were left guarding a British tank while the officer relieved some of his men. At that moment some Germans ran by, Wendelen fired his revolver while Elaine fired a gun on the tank. Neither hit their target, although Elaine believed she had damaged a monument. It was at this moment that Elaine learned that the important 'Monsieur Bernard', whom she had been accompanying while arranging passage to Britain, was non other than Prince Charles of Belgium. Elaine shocked as she had been critical of Prince Charles and his brother the King while speaking with 'Monsieur Bernard'.

Elaine joined an SOE group led by René Verstrepen, to work as a coder with wireless operator Michael Blaze. The group operated in the western Netherlands providing information to the Canadian First Army.

During their service Elaine and Wendelen had become lovers. With the liberation the new Belgian government had offered him the role of Belgian Ambassador to Austria. Elaine explained what happened -

In those days to be an ambassador you needed money and André didn't have any money, or not much as his father was a General and I suppose they had a nice house, but they didn't have a fortune. I had no money-even less than he did. So he married a girl with money... and I married Michael Blaze out of spite.

— Elaine Madden

After SOE, Elaine volunteered for the Special Allied Airborne Reconnaissance Force (SAARF). With SAARF she was sent to the Nazi Concentration Camps to find surviving SOE agents, Belgian political prisoners and resistance workers. Her mission took her to Buchenwald, Dachau, Bergen-Belsen and Flossenberg. In her search of the camps she found only two survivors.

In October 1945 she was Mentioned in Despatches for her service with SOE.

Elaine was later awarded the Belgian Croix de Guerre. Speaking of her war experiences she said, "I wasn’t a heroine. Just young and excited and willing to do anything except join the ATS! I wasn’t a heroine but I can still look in the mirror and feel proud".

== Sources ==
- O'Connor, Bernard (2012), Churchill's Angels: How Britain's Women Secret Agents Changed the Course of the Second World War, Amberley, ISBN 978-1445608280
- Elliott, Sue (2015), I Heard My Country Calling: Elaine Madden, the Unsung Heroine of SOE, The History Press, ISBN 978-0750961257
