= André Dewavrin =

French Army officer

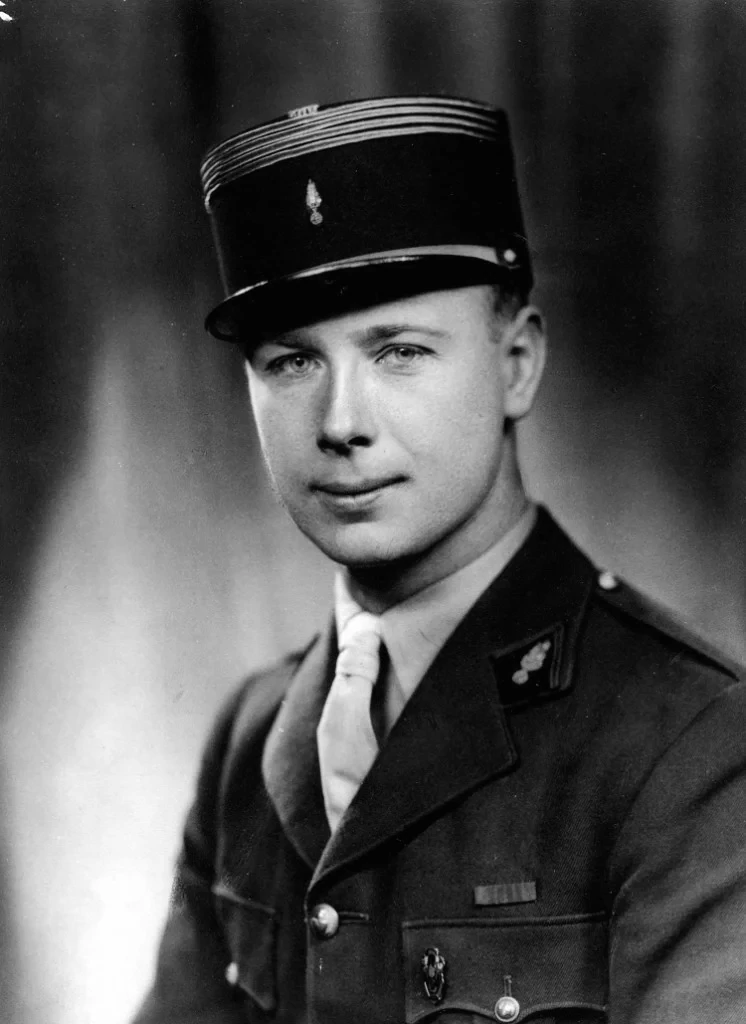
- Born: 9 June 1911; Paris, France
- Died: 20 December 1998 (aged 87); Paris, France
- Burial place: Neuilly-sur-Seine Old Communal Cemetery
- Military career
- Allegiance: France
- Branch: French Army
- Service years: 1932–1946
- Rank: Major
- Nickname: Passy
- Commands: Bureau Central de Renseignements et d'Action
- Conflicts: World War II
- Awards: Grand Croix de la Légion d'Honneur; Compagnon de la Libération; Croix de guerre 39/45 (4 citations); Médaille de la Résistance; Distinguished Service Order (UK); Military Cross (UK); War Cross (Norway)
- Other work: Businessman

André Dewavrin DSO, MC (9 June 1911 – 20 December 1998) (colonel Passy) was a French officer who served with Free French Forces intelligence services during World War II.

== Biography ==
He was born in Paris, the son of a businessman. He graduated as an army engineer and in 1938 began to teach as a professor in Saint Cyr military academy.

After the outbreak of World War II, Dewavrin was assigned to Norway in 1940 before he joined General Charles de Gaulle in Britain. He received the rank of major, took charge of the Free French military intelligence unit Bureau Central de Renseignements et d'Action (BCRA) and took the codename "Colonel Passy". He began to help organise the French Resistance movement and co-operated with the SOE.

Some of Dewavrin's closest colleagues (Captain Fourcaud and Lieutenant Duclos) were Cagoulards (a right-wing group), but Dewavrin always denied being one and insisted that he had supported the Republic during the Spanish Civil War and had opposed the Munich Agreement.

Dewavrin collated information from the French Resistance and planned operations for 350 agents who were parachuted to France to work with them. He secretly traveled to France on occasion to meet with the Resistance and coordinate intelligence gathering and sabotage. On 23 February 1943 Dewavrin parachuted to France alongside Pierre Brossolette to meet with Jean Moulin.

Later in 1943, Dewavrin's organization was merged with the conventional secret service of the Free French Forces to form DGSS under Jacques Soustelle. Dewavrin served as Soustelle's technical advisor before he took the lead of the organisation in October 1944. After the Normandy Invasion, Dewavrin became Chief of Staff to General Marie Pierre Koenig, the Commander of the French Forces of the Interior.

After the war, Dewavrin was head of intelligence for de Gaulle's provisional government until de Gaulle resigned in January 1946. His successor accused Dewavrin of embezzling Free French money for his own purposes. Dewavrin was jailed for four months in Vincennes. He was eventually acquitted for lack of evidence. The British historian Antony Beevor suspects that Dewavrin might have tried to collect money to work against a possible communist takeover attempt.

Dewavrin published three volumes of memoirs in 1947, 1949 and 1951 and eventually retired from the army to become a businessman.

He portrayed himself in Jean Pierre Melville's film L'Armée des ombres.

According to The Secret War by Max Hastings, a Soviet spy made a claim in a report to Moscow that Dewavrin had been recruited by Wilhelm Canaris to work for the Germans. Hastings stated that report was false but supplied no reference to support his statement.

== Books ==
- Lacouture, Jean. De Gaulle: The Rebel 1890–1944 (1984; English ed. 1991), 640 pp, W W Norton & Co, London. ISBN 978-0393026993
