= Bureau central de renseignements et d'action =

French intelligence agency (1940–1943)

Agency overview
- Formed: 1 July 1940
- Preceding agencies: Deuxième Bureau; Service de Renseignements (SR); Bureau central de renseignements et d’action militaire (BCRAM)
- Dissolved: 27 November 1943
- Superseding agency: Direction générale des Services spéciaux (DGSS)
- Headquarters: Free France
- Minister responsible: Charles de Gaulle
- Agency executives: André Dewavrin; Pierre Brossolette
- Child agency: Bureau central de renseignements et d'action et Londres (BCRAL)

The Bureau central de renseignements et d'action (French: [byʁo sɑ̃tʁal də ʁɑ̃sɛɲmɑ̃ e daksjɔ̃], Central Bureau of Intelligence and Operations), abbreviated BCRA, was the World War II-era forerunner of the SDECE and DGSE, the French intelligence services. Originally known as the Service de Renseignements (SR), it was created by Charles de Gaulle in 1940 as a Free French intelligence system that combined both military and political roles, including covert operations. On 15 April 1941, its name was changed to Bureau central de renseignements et d’action militaire (BCRAM). The policy of covert and secret operations was reversed in 1943 by Emmanuel d'Astrier (1900–1969), who insisted on civilian control of political intelligence. The Bureau was first commanded by Major André Dewavrin, who had taken the nom de guerre "Colonel Passy", while journalist Pierre Brossolette (1903–44) headed the civilian-arm.

== History ==
The organization was preceded by the Deuxième Bureau, which had been the French external military intelligence agency since 1871.

Following the defeat of France in 1940, the Vichy France regime's intelligence service was organized within the Centre d’information gouvernemental (Center for Government Information, CIG), under the direction of Admiral François Darlan. According to General Louis Rivet (French General), head of the Deuxième Bureau since 1936, shortly following the defeat of France in June 1940, he, Captain Paul Paillole, and various members of the counter-intelligence service met at the Seminary of Bon-Encontre near Agen. With the assistance of General Maxime Weygand, they planned to revive French counter-intelligence against German domination. General Rivet's memoirs remain controversial, but according to his account the official Vichy Bureau des Menées Antinationales (Bureau of Anti-national Activities, BMA), officially an organization opposing communist activities and resistance efforts and accepted by the Germans under the terms of the armistice, was in reality a cover for the pursuit of collaborators with the Germans. The main vehicle for such operations was "L’entreprise des Travaux Ruraux" (The Rural Work Enterprise), supposedly an agricultural engineering program, which performed clandestine counter-espionage under the command of Captain Paillole. In August 1942, the BMA was dissolved and recreated clandestinely as the Military Security Service by Pierre Laval and Admiral Darlan, who needed such an organisation to try to preserve Vichy French sovereignty. Paillole was given control of this new organization.

Meanwhile, on 1 July 1940, the Free French government-in-exile in London created its own intelligence service. General Charles de Gaulle assigned Major Dewavrin to command the organization. Initially known as the Service de Renseignements (SR), the agency would change its name to Bureau central de renseignements et d’action militaire (BCRAM) on 15 April 1941, and again change to Bureau central de renseignements et d’action (BCRA) on 17 January 1942.

Initially, it consisted of a single section:

- Renseignement (R): commanded by Captain André Manuel (French military) (aka "Pallas"), which worked closely with British intelligence agency MI6.

Subsequently, other sections were added:

- Action militaire (A/M) (Military action): created 15 April 1941, commanded by Captain Raymond Lagier (aka "Bienvenüe") and Fred Scamaroni, working with the British Special Operations Executive.
- Contre-espionnage (CE) (Counterintelligence): created 16 December 1941, commanded by Roger Warin (aka Roger Wybot) and Stanislas Mangin, working with the British MI5.
- Évasion (E) (Escape): created February 1942, commanded by Lieutenant Mitchell, working with the British MI9.
- Politique (N/M for non militaire) (Non-military operations): August 1942, commanded by Jacques Bingen, Jean Pierre-Bloch, and Louis Vallon

Upon the reconciliation between General Henri Giraud and Charles de Gaulle in 1943, the French national liberation committee ordered the fusion of the BCRA and the clandestine intelligence services of Rivet into a new structure, the Direction générale des services Spéciaux (DGSS, General Directorate of Special Services). Louis Rivet resigned in opposition to the new organization.

In 1944 the DGSS became the Direction générale des études et recherches (DGER, General Directorate for Study and Research), which became the Service de documentation extérieure et de contre-espionnage (SDECE, External Documentation and Counter-Espionage Service) in 1945.

== See also ==
- Free France
- F. F. E. Yeo-Thomas
- Operation Jedburgh
- SDECE
- Special Operations Executive
