= Mort pour la France =

French legal expression

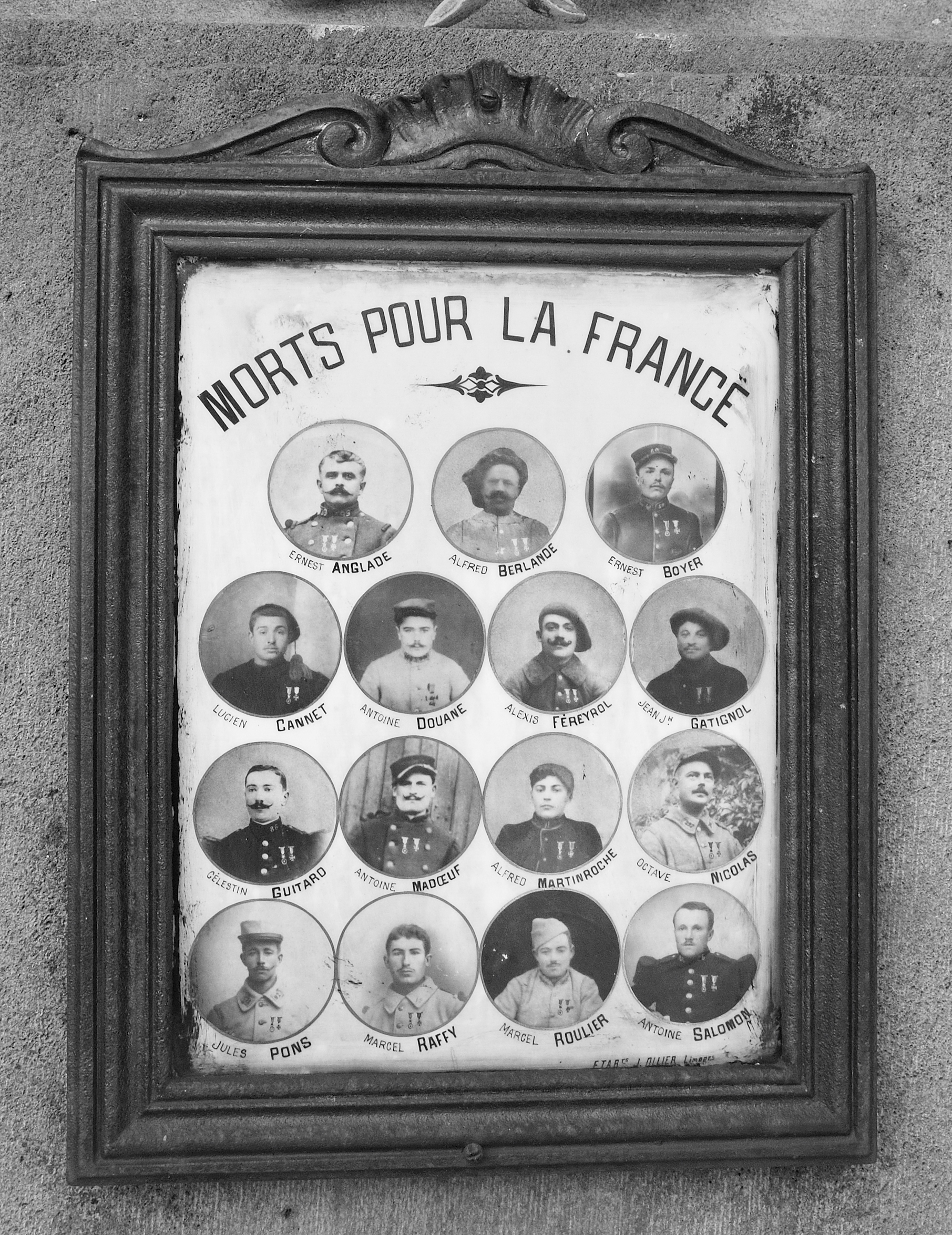
- Montaigut-le-Blanc cemetery, tribute to the soldiers killed during the First World War (Puy-de-Dôme, France)
- Context: World War I
- Coined by: Code des pensions militaires d'invalidité et des victimes de guerre
- Meaning: lit. 'Died for France'

Mort pour la France (French pronunciation: [mɔʁ puʁ la fʁɑ̃s], lit. 'died for France') is a legal expression in France and an honour awarded to people who died during a conflict, usually in service of the country.

== Definition ==
The term is defined in L.488 to L.492 (bis) of the Code of Military Disability Pensions and War Victims. It applied to members of the French military forces who died in action or from an injury or an illness contracted during service during the First and Second World Wars, the Indochina and Algeria Wars, and fighting in Morocco and the Tunisian War of Independence, as well as to civilians killed during these conflicts. Both French citizens and volunteers of other citizenship are eligible to be honored.

== Administration ==
The words "Mort pour la France" are recorded on the death certificate.

The status is awarded by

- minister responsible for veterans and victims of war, or
- minister responsible for the merchant marine, or
- state minister responsible for national defense.

Additionally the diploma «Aux morts de la grande guerre, la patrie reconnaissante» is awarded to the family of

- military men of the land or naval forces, who died during the First World War, or
- military men of the land, naval or air forces, or members of Free France / Fighting France (Forces françaises libres, FFL / Forces françaises combattantes, FFC), the French Forces of the Interior (Forces françaises de l'Intérieur, FFI), or the French Resistance, who died during the Second World War.

This diploma is awarded by the minister responsible for veterans and war victims.

== Copyright ==
French copyright law gives a special 30 years extension of copyright to creative artists declared "Mort pour la France" over the usual 70 years post mortem (article L. 123-10).

=== Writers ===
List of writers officially declared "Mort pour la France".

- Alain-Fournier (1914)
- Paul Acker (1915)
- Jacques Arthuys (1943)
- Guillaume Apollinaire (1918)
- Victor Basch (1944)
- Pierre Brossolette (1944)
- Benjamin Crémieux (1944)
- Louis Codet (1914)
- Jacques Decour (1942)
- Jean Desbordes (1944)
- Robert Desnos (1945)
- Luc Dietrich (1944)
- Benjamin Fondane (1944)
- Charles Hainchelin (1944)
- Maurice Halbwachs (1945)
- Max Jacob (1944)
- Régis Messac (1945)
- Léon de Montesquiou (1915)
- Irène Némirovsky (1942)
- Georges Politzer (1942)
- Charles Péguy (1914)
- Louis Pergaud (1915)
- André Ruplinger (1914)
- Antoine de Saint-Exupéry (1944)
- Louis-Félix de La Salle de Rochemaure (1915)
- Albert Thierry (1915)
- Georges Valois (1945)
- François Vernet (1945)
- Jean de la Ville de Mirmont (1914)
- Jean Zay (1944)
- Raymond Naves (fr) (1944)

=== Composers ===
List of composers officially declared "Mort pour la France".

- Jehan Alain (1940)
- Joseph Boulnois (1918)
- Émile Goué (1946)
- Fernand Halphen (1917)
- Maurice Jaubert (1940)
- René Vierne (1918)

=== Resistance fighters ===
List of resistance fighters officially declared "Mort pour la France"

- Guy Môquet (1941)
- Jean Moulin (1943)
- Marie Politzer (1943)
- Berthe Hirsch (1943)
- Missak Manouchian (1944)
- Szlama Grzywacz (1944)
- Thomas Elek (1944)
- Spartaco Fontanot (1944)
- Wolf Wajsbrot (1944)
- Joseph Epstein (1944)
- Sarkis Bedikian (1944)

=== Others ===
Others officially declared "Mort pour la France".

- Georges Peignot (1915)
- Roger Claudel (1944)
- Raoul Minot (1945)

== See also ==
- List of French villages destroyed in World War I
