= SOE RF Section =

British unit supporting the French Resistance in WW2

Following the creation of SOE's F Section in the summer of 1940, it became eventually apparent that French anti-German sentiment was not as simple as once thought and effectively fell into two camps - those who supported de Gaulle and those who did not. To keep these camps apart, RF Section (pro-Gaullists) was mooted in late 1940 and came into being in early 1941. By May 1941 it was established at 1, Dorset Square and initially headed by Capt Eric Piquet-Wicks. The complexities of the interplay between F and RF Sections and between RF and BCRA is covered in MRD Foot's book "The SOE in France". The operations listed below are effectively, jointly mounted by SOE-RF and BCRA with the former supplying, or access to, the materiél (flights, wireless-sets, weapons, training etc.) with the BCRA supplying personnel. The men and women who made their ways to London to join BCRA came from a wide background both in terms of profession and location. To assume they were French and lately of the remnants of the French military is an over-simplification - civilians as well as foreign-born pro-French sympathisers make up a notable proportion of the agents prepared to fight for France.

== Operations timeline ==
Section RF of the Special Operations Executive.

- Pierre Tillet's cited work forms the basis of this summary, this is hereby acknowledged. Where missions are logged as RF/BCRA, they are detailed below and augmented with citations from predominantly French sources. Uncited detail by default stems from Tillet's work.
- The Service Historique de la Defense has produced an index of BRCA agents, this covers some 16400 agents' dossiers. From the work of Tillet, most of these agents must have performed their acts of resistance in situ since relatively few are recorded travelling into France from abroad
- Separating F-Section 's and RF Section's operations becomes difficult as both increase in activity and share some resources including agents - these lists are by no means definitive in this regard.
- These operations are almost entirely mounted as joint operations between RF-Section and BCRA. A brief explanation of this relationship follows.
- Many of the links are in French.

== Missions and networks by year ==
=== 1941 ===
Summarized from 'Table of History of agents In/Exfiltrated Year 1941 - table 34.2 by P. Tillet'

- TORTURE: Henri Labit and Jean-Louis Cartigny parachuted blind near Mutrécy, Calvados on 5 July 1941. Objective: Recce of German-held airbase at Carpiquet. The pair were betrayed and separated. Cartigny arrested 7 July with Lucien Frémont (mayor of Lasson, shot 31 March 1942). Cartigny shot 4 Feb 1942. Labit escaped to Toulouse and helped in getting the FABULOUS circuit underway. He returned to London via Spain, arriving 8 Aug 1941.
- TROMBONE CIP: Robert Lencement dropped blind near Chateauroux, Indre on 29 Aug. His brief was to form three circuits amongst his neighbours for sabotage, propaganda and intelligence - an ambitious plan given he had had only 2 weeks training. Arrested 31 Dec 1941, released and re-arrested in 1943, sent to Fresnes (near Paris) then to Buchenwald and Mittelbau-Dora. Released 2 May 1945.
- DASTARD: Raymond Laverdet and André Allainmat dropped near Petit Chaumont, Seine et Marne on 7 Sept 1941. Made contact with a sizable group 'Armée Gaulliste Volontaire' but were discovered by the Gestapo. Allainmat arrested in Paris 6 Sept 1942 sent via Sarrebrück to Mauthausen, liberated 19 May 1945.
- FABULOUS: Jacques Furet dropped near Lévignac, Haute Garonne to join Henri Labit on 10 Sept 1941. Furet arrested 22 Nov in Toulouse by the Vichy police and handed to Germans, deported to Buchenwald 18 Aug 1944 and returned April 1945. Labit returned to the UK via St-Pabu, Finistére on 6 Jan 1942.
- BARTER-1: Roger Donnadieu and Michel-Etienne Laurent dropped 5 km (3.1 mi) from Mimisan, Landes on Sept 10. Objective: To reconnoitre the Mérignac (now Bordeaux) airfield, wireless radio damaged - operation incomplete. Laurent shot by Gestapo and died en route to La Pitié Hospital, Paris 22 June 1942.
- MAINMAST-B: Jean Forman and René Periou dropped on DZ Lamartinette near Fonsorbes, Haute Garonne 13 October. Objective: To contact resistance groups in the Lyon and Montpellier regions. Forman returned to UK 6 Jan 1942 on operation OVERCLOUD-III, Periou arrested at Agen railway station 8 Dec, escaped 12 Dec. Re-arrested in Hericy-sur-Seine 14 May 1942 and deported to Struthof-Natzweiler then Dachau. Liberated 15 May 1945.
- OVERCLOUD: This had several operations associated with it, OVERCLOUD (#) operated from 14 Oct running MV360s from the Helford river in Cornwall to St Pabu, Finistére and back. This was the achievement of Joël LeTac and Alain, le Comte de Kergorlay.
- OUTCLASS: Yvon Morandat dropped near Fonsorbes, Haute Garonne on 6 Nov. Objective: Contact with Christian trade unionists in the Lyon area.
- TROUT: Philippe Koeningswerther (wireless operator) dropped near Montaigu-le-Blin, Allier on 26 Nov. Wireless set found by Gendarmerie. Koeningswerther arrested Dec 1943, executed in Struthof-Natzweiler Sept 1944.
- COD: Edgard Tupët-Thomé and Joseph Piet dropped near Ménétréols-sous-Vatan, Indre on 8 Dec. Objective: To set up the Antoine network. Both men were injured in the drop, Piet was arrested in Marseilles on 21 Sept 1942, escaped and was re-arrested in St-Girons in Béam on 20 May 1944 en route to Spain. Deported to Dachau 2 July 1944, liberated 1 June 1945. Tupët-Thomé exfiltrated May 1942 (see Shrimp below)
- PLAICE: Pierre Moureaux (Wireless operator) landed by MGB-314 (using Overcloud route), arrived at Aber Benoit, Finistère 31 Dec 1941. Objective: Meet up with LeTac to replace de Kergorlay. Moureaux arrested 2 Feb 1942 and sent to Allach then Dachau, liberated April 1945.

=== 1942 ===
Summarized from 'Table of History of agents In/Exfiltrated Year 1942 - table 34.3 by P. Tillet'

- ROBERT/PERCH/MAINMAST-A: Jean Moulin, Raymond Fassin and Joseph Monjaret dropped blind near Fontvieille, Bouches du Rhone on 1 January 1942. Objective - Unification and co-ordination of Resistance groups. Monjaret arrested 4 April 1942, deported to Mauthausen 20 Sept and liberated 4 May 1945.
- DACE/CYPRUS/HORNBEAM: Louis Bourdat (plus SOE-F agents Donald Dunton and Jack Fincken) dropped on DZ near Mulsanne, Sarthe on 25 January 1942. Objective to meet up with Raymond Laverdet. Bourdat had a narrow escape having lost one shoe during the drop; he was stopped by two curious French gendarmes who were evidently anglophiles and helped him find the missing shoe. The Paris Police Judiciaire attempted to arrest Bourdat and Laverdet on July 15, 1942, in the ensuing gun battle, Bourdet was fatally shot by René Fortin of the RG and died in the Marmottan hospital. Laverdet escaped.
- NICK/PERNOD: Robert Delattre dropped on DZ Nick Pernod near Le Moulin, Deux Sèvres on (?6 Jan 1942). Objective - to replace WT operator (Bernard Antiquetil who had been executed 24 Oct 1941), Delattre arrested 29 May 1942 in Paris, died in Fresnes 13 May 1943.
- EASTER: Jacques Soulas by Lysander to LZ 2 km (1.2 mi) E of Etrepagny, Eure on 1/2 April. His mission was to carry out several intelligence tasks for Dewavrin including assessing the predisposition of several eminent politicians to participating in the formation of the Resistance.
- BRIDGE/ISABELLE/CAHORS/PHALANX: François Faure and Christian Pineau by Lysander to LZ 1.5 km (0.93 mi) east of St Saens near Rouen on 27 April 1942. Exfiltration of Pierre Brossolette and Jacques Robert to UK. Faure arrested 15 May 1942 and deported to Dachau, liberated April 1945.
- BASS: Henri Labit dropped near Sore, Landes on 1 May 1942. Objective - to establish a resistance network in the Bordeaux area. Labit was stopped by German guards on the train at Langon and his radio was discovered, he shot two Germans before escaping and before being captured swallowed his cyanide pill.
- PILCHARD: Henri Clastère, Paul Bodhaine and Maxime Gaudin parachuted blind on 5 May 1942 28 km (17 mi) from planned DZ near Pierrefitte-sur-Sauldre, Loir et Cher. Operation to destroy Radio Paris transmitter at Allouis between Vizeron and Bourges. Returned to UK via Spain and Gibraltar.
- GOLDFISH: René-Georges Weill, André Montaut and Olivier Jacques Courtaud parachuted onto DZ Roland Garros between Avesnes-sur-Helpe and Vervins, Aisne. Supply of wireless comms to Front National. Weill arrested and committed suicide 29 May 1942, Montaut arrested 21 July in Lyon, died in Mauthausen 2 June 1944. Courtaud arrested 28 June 1943, deported to Buchenwald thence Bergen-Belsen, liberated 15 April 1945.
- SHRIMP: Gaston Tavian and Jacques Pain to LZ Faucon near Les Lagnys, Indre 29 May 1942. Objective: to set up Action Branch of Antoine network.
- SALMON: Maurice de Cheveigné parachuted blind about 3 km (1.9 mi) south of Thoissey, Ain. Wireless Operator for Jacques Soulas.
- PYTHON: Pierre Brossolette and Jacques Robert dropped near Uchizy, Saône et Loire, June 3. Objective: To set up Phratrie network. Robert arrested in Nice 29 April 1943 by French Police, escaped 2 May, reached London 16 June 1943.
- CRAB/PERCH/MINNOW: Paul Frédéric Schmidt, Gérard Brault and Jean Holley dropped by parachute 3 June near Givarlais near Montluçon, Allier. Holley along with Rennais Jean Loncle and Marcel Lenclos arrested 20 Jan 1943 at Annecy. Holley and Loncle were tortured by the Gestapo before being handed over to the Italians and imprisoned in Turin, then Parma and Fossoli then sent to Mauthausen, both were liberated 8 May 1945. Lenclos was deported to Bolzano in northern Italy and died (no further details are known).
- SARDINE: Roger Lardy landed by sea at Cape d'Ail near Monte Carlo on 11 June. Objective - to contact ecclesiastics.
- DORY: Michel Gries parachuted on DZ Capucine 2 km (1.2 mi) SE of Cournon d'Auvergne on June 23. Arrested 2 days later, escaped and crossed Spanish border and returned to London 31 July 1943 via Gibraltar.
- CRAYFISH/BRILL: Jean Orabona, Henri Bertrand and Xavier Rouxin dropped onto DZ Milan near Boisset-les-Montrond, Loire 24 July. Orabona fatally injured during drop. Rouxin arrested 17 Sept 1943 in Avignon, escaped 21 March 1944 - returned to London via Spain 11 July 1944.
- ROACH/MACKEREL: Jean Ayral, Francois Briant and Daniel Bouyjou-Cordier dropped onto DZ Monge near Corsages, Allier 25 July. Ayral was KIA 22 August 1944 while securing the Castellet district of Toulon. Briant arrested 3 April 1943 in Garches, deported 24 Jan 1944 to Buchenwald (&c), released 3 May 1945 arrived in Paris 19 May 1945.
- BULL/MERCURE: 6 Agents including Emmanuel d'Harcourt landed by sea from HMS Tarana between Agde and Narbonne, Aude 17 August. Objective - d'Harcourt was made Chef du Bureau of the National Commissariat for Foreign Affairs in March 1942 and MERCURE was an operation of liaison between senior French personnel (his father Gen d'Harcourt, Dunoyer de Segonzac, Paul Claudel etc). This ended in February 1943 when d'Harcourt attempted to leave France via Spain. Arrested and interned in Barcelona, he was liberated 10 June 1943 and returned to London.
- BOREAS-II / BOREE / MERCURE: Pierre Delaye and Pierre Demoulin landed by Lysander (crashed and was destroyed by F/L W.G. Lockhart). Pilot exfiltrated by felouca during LEDA-2 operation. Delaye arrested and shot by Gestapo 11 May 1943 in Loyettes, Ain.
- CLAM: Pierre Boutoule dropped onto DZ Latour near La Tour du Pin, Isère 31 August 1942. Boutoule arrested by Gestapo 2 March 1943, jailed in St-Paul Prison, Lyon and liberated 21 April 1944. Arrived London 2 May 1944 via Gibraltar.
- ORLANDO: Émile Champion landed by sea 18 Sept at Morgiou 7 km (4.3 mi) west of Cassis, Bouches du Rhône.
- HAGFISH: Pierre Nogue dropped onto DZ near Penchard near Meaux, Seine et Marne. Nogue arrested 26 Oct 1942 in Turgon (Charente). Jailed in Angoulême, deported to Sachsenhausen. Liberated 1 May 1945 and repatriated 25 May 1945.
- CHUB: Pierre Julitte (and others from SOE-F) landed by sea at Cap-de-l'Esquillon near Cannes, Alpes Maritimes, 2 October. Julitte arrested 10 March 1943 imprisoned at the St Pierre prison in Marseilles and deported from Fresnes to Sarrebrück thence to Buchenwald. Through a free worker en route to France, Julitte was able to send a report on the manufacture of V2 rockets and the Mibau factory at Buchenwald. Liberated 11 April 1945 and repatriated 15 April 1945. Exfiltrated: Roger Lardy.
- GARTERFISH: Marcel Damiens dropped on DZ 4 km (2.5 mi) SW of Fontevraud l'Abbaye, Maine et Loire 31 October. Objective - To destroy the two main transformers near Saumur. This accomplished, Damiens simply went home (see FOOT p204).
- 10 November 1942 - Germans overrun Demarcation Line
- GIBEL/CATFISH: Henri Frenay and Emmanuel d’Astier de la Vigerie landed on LZ Courgette near Courlaoux, Jura on 17 November 1942. Objective - to unify Franc-Tireur, Libération and Combat movements.
- SKATE/SQUID: Roger Lardy, Jacques Pain and (X) landed on LZ Faucon near Les Lagnys, Indre on 22 November 1942.
- PERCH-3/WHALE/GUDJEON: Gilbert Mus and Georges Denviolet dropped on DZ Abricot/Banane near Beaucresson, Loire on 22 November 1942. Objectives - Industrial Sabotage amongst which was the centre of the arsenal at Toulon in March 1943. Mus was arrested at Pierrelate (Drôme) train station 11 April 1943 and deported via Avignon, Marseilles and Fresnes to Mauthausen, liberated 29 April 1945. Denviolet was seriously injured during the jump when the parachute jammed and he was thrown against the aircraft. He was able to complete his mission, but was pursued by the Gestapo while he tried to return to England via Spain. He was arrested and sent to Buchenwald in May/June 1943.
- RUFF/PIKE/CARP: Jean Loncle and Jean Paimblanc landed on LZ Univers/Bouc near Châteauneuf du Cher, Cher on 25 November 1942. Loncle arrested 20 Jan 1943 at Annecy (see CRAB above). Paimblanc escaped via Spain in April 1943.
- CHUB-MINOR/STARFISH/MENHAVEN: Louis Guillaume Marie Kerjean and Jean-Baptiste Simon landed on LZ Univers/Bouc near Châteauneuf du Cher, Cher on 17 December 1942. Kerjean was arrested 10 March 1943 on a train between Toulon and Marseilles and imprisoned in Marseilles, then Fresnes and deported to Struthof-Natzweiler, Buchenwald and Dachau. He was liberated in the spring of 1945. Simon was arrested 10 May 1943 and sent to Fresnes then Compiègne Camp - he escaped 25 August 1944.
- COCKLE: Guy Lenfant and André Rapin dropped west of Lezonnet, Morbihan on 21 December 1942. In the early part of 1943 they organised the reception and caching of arms and explosives in the farms in Ploërmel, Loyat, Taupont and Campénéac. The two men were exfiltrated on 15 July 1943 (see Howitzer below).

=== 1943 ===
Summarized from 'Table of History of agents In/Exfiltrated Year 1943 - table 34.4 by P. Tillet'

- HAWKINS/EMMANUEL: Michel Pichard and Louis Jourdren landed by sea 9 km (5.6 mi) SW of Glénan Islands, south of Concarneau on 6 January 1943.
- DAB/SEA URCHIN: Godefroy (Fred) Scamaroni, Jean-Baptiste Hellier and James Anthony Jickell landed by sea Cupabia Bay, Corsica. Hellier betrayed by Salvatore Serra, tried and shot 15 July 1943. Scamaroni arrested 18 March and committed suicide 20 March 1943
- ATALA: Pierre Brossolette landed by Lysander (RAF Sqdn 161) at LZ Marabout near Grand Maleray, Cher 26 January 1943.
- WHITEBAIT/PRAWN/GURNARD: Henry Borosh (SOE-F), Richard Heritier and Charles Garland (SOE-F?) landed on LZ Courgette near Courlaoux, Jura 26 January.
- PORPOISE/PRAWN/GURNARD: Henri Manhès, Richard Heritier and Charles Garland dropped on DZ near Ruffey-sur-Seille, Jura 13 Feb. Manhès arrested 3 Mar 1943, deported to Buchenwald and liberated 11 April 1945. Heritier arrested 21 May 1943 in Lyon, deported to Sachsenhausen on 21 Nov 1943, escaped 2 May 1945 and saved by US Army next day. Repatriated 26 May 1945. Garland arrested 1 July 1943, sent to Eysses prison and liberated 9 Jan 1944.
- BREWER: Henri Clastère and Paul Bodhaine dropped blind near Ablis, Yvelines 15 Feb. Objective: To destroy aircraft factory Caudron-Renault in Issy Les Moulineaux.
- BURGUNDY: Georges Broussine landed near Saint Branchs, Indre et Loire. Flight was planned to parachute Broussine onto DZ near Bourg-en-Bresse, Ain, cancelled due to fog. Broussine escaped after landing but Halifax of Sqdn 138 hit by flak en route home. All 8 crew made POW.
- SEAHORSE: Forest Yeo-Thomas and André Dewavrin dropped on DZ Orange near Bosquentin, Eure 26 Feb. Objective: Organization of resistance in France.
- TRAINER: Pierre Lejeune (plus SOE-F members John Goldsmith, Robert Dowlen and Francoise Agazarian) landed near Asionne, Vienne 17 March.
- SIRENE-II/PHALANX: Jean Moulin, Gen. Charles Delestraint and Christian Pineau landed at LZ Lilas, near Melay, Saône et Loire 19 March. Moulin arrested by Klaus Barbie in Caluire 21 June with a dozen leading gaullists, died 8 July from injuries sustained during his torture. Delestraint arrested at métro La Muette on 9 June 1943, sent to Struthof-Natzweiler then Dachau; shot 19 April 1945. Pineau arrested in Lyon 3 May 1943, deported to Buchenwald 14 Dec 1943, repatriated April 1945.
- ROACH-4/MUSSEL-MINOR/WINKLE: Louis Tolmé and Jean-François Le Gac dropped on DZ Bison near Chartres, Indre et Loire. Le Gac arrested 10 Nov 1943, deported and died in Hersbruck 20 Oct 1944. Tolmé arrested 4 April 1943, deported and repatriated 1 May 1945.
- LEG/WHISKERS: Commandant Paulin Colonna d'Istria (BCRAA) and Luc Le Fustec landed by submarine N52 HMS Trident near the mouth of the river Travo, Solenzara, Corsica on 6 April 1943. Objective - to unify and co-ordinate Corsican resistance. Exfiltrated Robert de Schrevel and James Anthony Jicknell.
- PERCH-4/ROBALO/NAUTILUS/SHRIMP: Rodolphe Jove, Bernard Boulage and Xavier Bouchet parachuted on DZ Josette near Pressy sur Dondin, Saône et Loire on 11 April. Objective: to centralise and organise resistance activities in the Lyon, Mâcon, Dijon, Nice, Cannes and Marseilles areas. Boulage was betrayed by a neighbour and arrested 18 Aug 1943 in Lyon. After being imprisoned at Montluc and Fresnes, he was deported to Mauthausen 17 Feb 1944 and died there on 29 April 1945, Jove escaped via Switzerland.
- HALIBUT: Alain Grout de Beaufort and Jacques Setruk landed at LZ Marguerite/David near Feillens, Ain on 13 April 1943. De Beaufort sent to replace Paul Frédéric Schmidt as head of R6. Beaufort arrested 27 July 1944 in Paris (XVIe) with André Rondenay, both were tortured and shot on 15 August 1944 at the Carrefour-des-Quatre Chênes in the Domont forest. Setruk was arrested two days after landing following operation Dogfish (below) at l'Hotel du Raisin, Pont de Vaux but appears to have escaped and returned to London in August 1943.
- LIBERTY/JULIETTE: Jean Cavaillès, Emmanuel d'Astier de la Vigerie and Robert Tainturier landed on LZ Pamplemousse near Morgny, Eure on 15 April. Cavaillès arrested 28 August 1943 and sent to Compiégne 19 Jan 1944, condemned to death with eleven other senior Résistance members on 5 April 1944, shot and dumped into the moat of Arras Citadel the same day.
- SCULPTOR: Pierre Natzler landed near La Chartre-sur-Loir, Sarthe on 15 April 1943.
- DOGFISH: Francis-Louis Closon and Louis Marie Fraval landed at LZ Junot near Arbigby, Ain on 15 April 1943. Objective: Make contact with General de la Porte du Theil ('Haut-Commissaire des Chantiers de Jeunesse') and report on Youth Organisations' support for the Résisitance.
- ROACH-3/FLOUNDER: Christian Motté-Houbigant parachuted onto DZ near Soligny les Etangs, Aube 15 April 1943. Objective: To organise parachuting operations in the Paris region.
- SABINE: 2 passengers landed on LZ Planete near Les Fontaines, Indre et Loire on 19 April 1943 - possibly Jean-Claude Camors (&1). Objective: To set up escape network in Bordeaux/Loupiac area. With the help of a Camaret fisherman and his boat, the 'Suzanne-René', approximately 60 stranded Allied aviators were returned to the UK via Cornwall. Camors left for UK via Spain 21 June 1943. On the 11 October 1943 at a meeting in Rennes, Camors and others were denounced by Nazi collaborator Guy Vissault de Coëtlogon, in the ensuing battle, Camors was fatally injured and taken to Rennes hospital, his body was never recovered.
- PENCILFISH: Exfiltration from LZ Senin near Amberac, Charente of Jacques Voyer (BCRA), Pierre Vienot, Marcel Poimboeuf and René Israel on 20 April 1943. Voyer, operating under the Sussex plan (no RF involvement), was dropped near Ruffec-le-Château on 10 April 1944. While observing an enemy convoy near Chartres, he was shot and arrested. Condemned for spying, he was executed 27 June 1944.
- BLUNDERBUS: Daniel Mayer (BCRA) landed at LZ Orion near Bletterans, Jura on 19 April 1943. Eight passengers exfiltrated.
- ROACH-33/LING: Georges Lecot dropped on DZ Girafe near Charly sur Marne, Aisne 20 April 1943.
- NASTURTIUM/PHYSICIAN 31: Pierre Hentic dropped on DZ near Cerdon, Loiret 21 May 1943. Objective - to organise flights and landings for the in/exfiltration of agents and allied airmen as BOA (Bloc d'Opérations Aériennes) for Jade-Fitzroy network Arrested 6 Jan 1944 in Paris and deported to Dachau 20 June 1944. Liberated by Allies 13 May 1945.
- LEG-I/SKIN: Corsican Résistance leader Paulin Colonna d'Istria to meet with SOE on board HMS Sibyl near Travo, Corsica 15 June 1943. Unable to return to Corsica and went to Algiers (see SCALP below)
- KNUCKLE-DUSTER: Claude Bouchinet-Serreules and Claude Sauvier landed on LZ Marguerite/David near Feillens, Ain on 15 June 1943. Bouchinet-Serreules was made deputy for Jean Moulin in February 1943, the two met in Lyon on 16 June 1943 to consider the impact of the arrest of Gen. Delestraint on 9 June. A meeting held 21 June with a number of MUR members was interrupted by the SD and many arrested - this became known as 'Le coup de fillet de Caluire'.
- ROACH42/BLUEFISH/DAGGER: René Cailleaud and Yves Picaud dropped on DZ Oxygéne near Levingy, Aube on 20 June. Objective - sabotage training using plastic explosives. Cailleaud led several successful attacks on important targets including the destruction of 14000 tonnes of explosives at the Langres magazine. He returned to London in August 1944 after being in-country for 15 months. Picaud arrested 16 Jan 1944 in Chalons sur Marne, interned in Fresnes and deported from Compiègne to Dachau on 18 June 1944. Liberated and repatriated 21 May 1945.
- SCALP/TUBE-V: Paulin Colonna d'Istria and Luc le Fustec landed by sea at Salecia, Corsica 2 July.
- BLOATER/ROACH-106: Roger Flouriot and Robert Barro dropped on DZ Balzac near Montoire sur le Loir, Loir et Cher 12 July. Barro arrested 10 March 1944, deported to Buchenwald and liberated 11 April 1945.
- HOWITZER: Exfiltration of Guy Lenfant and André Rapin from LZ Grenade near Auxerre, Yonne on 15 July. Lenfant was carrying folder 2223 (code name 'Panier des cerises') given by Maurice Guillaudot and containing the military disposition of the Germans in Morbihan (S Brittany). The BBC transmitted a coded message of thanks to Guillaudot on July 20 "Le panier de cerises est bien arrivé. Félicitations et remerciements à Yodi pour son action et son excellent travail." Guillaudot was arrested in December 1943, tortured and sent to Neuengamme. He was liberated in April 1945.
- BOOMERANG/ROACH-71: Paul Riviére and Marcel Pellay dropped onto DZ Vincent, Cormatin, Saône et Loire 22 July. Objectives: Riviére to replace Bruno Larat (captured by the Gestapo along with Jean Moulin 21 June 1943). Pellay: Destruction of locks ('barrage') at Gigny (26 July - Operation Boomerang) and setting up of new network AJAX. Pellay was arrested 3 December 1943 at Chapaize and transferred to Gestapo HQ in Lyon. He was deported to Buchenwald 18 January 1944 and liberated 7 April 1945.
- BUCKLER/FIGUE: Jean-Pierre Lévy and Emmanuel d'Astier de la Vigerie landed on LZ Figue, Curebourse, Ain on 27 July. Eight passengers collected.
- POPGUN: Francis-Louis Closon, Jacques Bingen and Gilbert Médéric-Védy landed on LZ Rabelais near Sougé, Loir et Cher on 15 Aug. Objective - Closon and Bingen to help Claude Bouchinet-Serreules following the capture of Jean Moulin. Bingen betrayed by double agent Alfred Dormal and arrested in Clermont-Ferrand 12 May 1944, he was able to escape but was recaptured and detained by the SD in Clermont-Ferrand where he swallowed his cyanide pill.
- BOB-30/MARIOTTE/AMPERE/GALILE: Jean-François Clouët des Pesruches and Jacques Guérin dropped on DZ Bourgogne near Poiseul les Saulx, Cote d'Or on 16 Aug 1943. Guérin was deported to Dachau-Allach, liberated 30 April 1945.
- ARMADA: André Jarrot and Raymond Basset dropped on DZ Napoléon near Gouttières, Puy du Dôme on 16 Aug. Objective - to destroy the HV stations of Germolles and Lacrost in Le Creusot, Saône et Loire.
- BOB-16/PONTON/SOLDAT/TRAINER-24: André Bonnami and Albert Toubas dropped on DZ Massenet near Dugny sur Meuse, Meuse on 18 Aug 1943. Bonnami KIA in Reclos, Dordogne 17 Dec 1944.
- TROJAN HORSE: Louis Franzini landed on LZ Marguerite/David near Feillens, Ain 23 Aug. Objective - Sabotage Instructor, made contact with Louis Burdet (DMR) and conducted sabotage operations in the PACA-Corsica region from August 1943 to September 1944.
- TUBE-VII/SCALOP-III: Lt Giannesini landed by submarine at Point of Capo di Ferro, Corsica 5 Sept.
- BATTERING-RAM/TORTUE: 8 passengers landed at LZ Gide near La Prée, Indre et Loire on 12 Sept 1943. Col. André Rondenay, Cdt. Noel Palaud, Lt/Col. Pierre Marchal, Valentin Abeille, Jean-Charles Kammerer, André Boulloche, Henri d'Eyrames and Jean-Baptiste Allard. Rondenay and Palaud tasked with operation TORTUE - objective: to develop a plan to delay, by at least 8 hours, heavy armoured German response to the Allied invasion. Allard with others to set up radio network in M region (Brittany) Allard completed this and was ordered out of the region by London and returned to London in August 1944. Marchal (DMN/DMZ Nord) was betrayed by Odette Sorlin and stopped by the Gestapo in Paris on 23 Sept 1943, he swallowed his cyanide pill before any interrogation could start. Abeille (DMR RM (Le Mans)) was trapped by the Gestapo 31 May 1944 and seriously injured. He was interrogated and moved to the Hospital de la Pitié, where he died June 2, 1944, without revealing any information. Kammerer took over DMR RM from Abeille but was also captured in June 1944 and deported; he died in Dachau in May 1945. Boulloche (DMR Paris) was arrested at home on 12 January 1944, seriously injured, he was taken to the Hospital de la Pitié and then to Fresnes. From there he was deported via Compiegne to Auschwitz and Buchenwald and liberated 23 April 1945.
- TANK: 8 passengers (mainly FFI staff) - Maurice Bourgés-Maunoury(DMN, DMR-R1), Lucien Cambas (DMR-R3), Louis Mangin (DMN), Paul Leistenschneider(DMR-R1), Charles Gaillard (Adj DMR-R1) & Camille Rayon (SAP R2), Emile Laffon plus SOE-F member Haim Victor Gerson landed on LZ Orion near Bletterans, Jura 14 Sept.
- PIQUIER/IROQUOIS/FLAMAN/BOB-62: Raymond Fassin, Maurice de Cheveigné, Lt Michel Gries and Pierre Jans dropped on DZ Vendée near Luxerois, Côte d'Or 15 Sept. Fassin to take up post of Regional Military Delegate for 'A' region (Lille-Amiens area), he was arrested (with de Cheveigné) in Paris 2 April 1944 and died 12 Feb 1945 while being deported to Neuengamme. Jans was arrested and jailed in Loos prison 13 April 1944, liberated 2 September 1944.
- BOMB/SERIN/MARIE-CLAIRE: André Déglise-Favre, Pierre Brossolette and Yeo-Thomas landed on LZ Serin near Amberac, Charente 18 Sept. Objectives: Déglise-Favre to set up a Parachute/Landing Section (SAP) covering 11 departments. He was arrested 2 Nov 1943 and committed suicide (cyanide) that night. Brossolette and Yeo-Thomas were to assess the state of the Résistance movement and report back. Yeo-Thomas was exfiltrated 15 Nov (see TOMMY-GUN below), Brossolette remained in France.
- BOB-74/GERMAIN/RADO/SOCCER: Albert Billard and Leon Pelosse dropped on DZ Musset near Cormoyeux, Marne on 18 Sept 1943. Pelosse placed in charge of sabotage training of the Maquis de Saffré. Having completed his mission, Pelosse returned to the UK via Bayeux to Newhaven on 4 Sept 1944.
- HORDE: Robert Lefranc dropped blind near Villemade, Tarn et Garonne on 20 Sept. Objective: to join André Pommiės and the CFP. was arrested 30 May 1944 and escaped 7 June. KIA 8 Sept 1944 in Dracy St-Loup, Saône et Loire.
- PEASHOOTER/MUSC/SAP: Jean Rosenthal (plus 2 SOE-F: Richard Heslop and François Gérard Michel and 1 BCRA: 'Longepierre' ) landed on LZ Junot near Arbigny, Ain on 21 Sept 1943. Objective: Evaluation of Haute-Savoie resistance.
- BOB-68/BARK/FARADAY: François Delimal and Jean Jolivet dropped on DZ Musset near Cormoyeux, Marne on 16 Oct 1943. Objective: Delimal in charge of parachute operations covering the departments of Marne, Haute-Marne, Côte d'Or and Haute Saône. Delimal arrested 20 March 1944 in Paris (15éme) and committed suicide (cyanide) the following day. Jolivet arrested 13 March 1944 in Epernay, deported 28 July 1944 to Neuengamme, died 5 March 1945.
- SHIELD: Émile Laffon, Armand Louis Khodja, Michel Cailliau and Henri Deschamps landed on LZ Aigle near La Montagne, Ain 16 Oct. Objective: to perform an analysis of the general situation and conduct sabotage operations. Khodja arrested 24 March 1944 in Paris while attacking the Gestapo HQ on rue Lauriston (16eme), deported to Bergen-Belsen 5 June and liberated 16 May 1945. Cailliau returned to London via Spain and Casablanca, arriving 27 May 1944.
- HELM/MARKSMAN/XAVIER: Jean Rosenthal (Plus 4 SOE-F members) landed on LZ Orion near Bletterans, Jura 18 Oct. The mission was more an exfiltration of some 18 members of the Provisional Assembly including Emmanuel d'Astier, Albert Gazier, Roger Farjon, Vincent Auriol, Jacques Brunschwig-Bordier, Jacques Lecomte-Boinet, Just Évrard and André le Troquer.
- SWORD: André Schock and Dr José Aboulker landed on LZ Bouche near Passy sur Seine, Seine et Marne on 20 Oct. Schock arrested 28 Jan 1944 and sent via Fresnes and Buchenwald to Bergen-Belsen, liberated 11 April 1945. Aboulker had been nominated as head of Health for the maquis, FFI and organisation of civilian Sanitation upon Liberation. He returned via London to Algiers in July 1944.
- JOHN-26/LOUGRE-A/COTRE-A/ARMADA-III: André Jarrot and Raymond Basset dropped on DZ Vincent near Courmatin, Saône et Loire 7 Nov. Objectives - sabotage operations of waterways and electricity supplies. Jarrot and Basset returned to the UK via Spain 6 April 1944.
- STARTER/TRAINER-60/TRAINER-67: Mario Yves Montefusco dropped near Besse en Chandesse, Puy de Dôme on 10 Nov. Objective: Establish WT liaisons between Vercors and London.
- TOMMY-GUN: René Houze and Georges Broussine landed on LZ Charente/Sarre near Canettemont Pas de Calais. Exfiltration of Yeo-Thomas (with Marcelle Virolle and Cécile Pichard) carrying important information about the V1 rocket installations on the Atlantic Wall.
- WATER PISTOL: Col. Claude Bonnier, Cpt. Jacques Nancy, André Desgranges and André Charlot landed on LZ Albatross near Vibrac, Charente on 15 Nov. Objective: Re-organise the entire resistance infrastructure of SW France following the Grandclément debacle. Bonnier was caught and arrested by the Gestapo in Bordeaux 9 Feb 1944, he committed suicide (cyanide) before being interrogated. Nancy was awarded the MC (and many French honours) in 1946 for a list of activities stemming from this operation.
- PATCHOULI: Marcel Suarès, Pierre Briout and Ernest Gimpel dropped on DZ Bugeaud near Garde-Lit, Ain 25 Nov. Objective: Destruction of ball-bearing factories in the Paris area.
- STEN: Cpt. Claudius Four, Émile Cossonneau and Gilbert Médéric-Vedy planned landing on LZ Farman near Dizy le Gros, Aisne on 10 Dec. Objective: Four to take command of aerial operations in region 'P' (Paris basin). Four and Cossonneau killed by flak over Berry-an-Bac, Aisne. Médéric-Vedy's flight turned back due to bad weather. These flights had planned to exfiltrate Pierre Brossolette, the BBC's coded message 'La Tante Zoé partira ce soir à bicyclette' was broadcast that night
- MARC-1: Gérard Hennebert and Henri Drouilh aborted planned drop on DZ due heavy fog. RAF 138 Halifax crashed into sea near Harwich. Hennebert parachuted out of the plane and was rescued, Drouilh was killed.
- BOB-66/LEMNISCATE: François Fouquat, Lt Maurice Juillet and Yves Léger dropped on DZ Massenet near Clefmont, Haute Marne on 20 Dec. Fouquet to join Suarès and Briout in operation Patchouli. Léger to head SAP section of region R6 ('Peter' Allier-Puy de Dôme-Haute Loire area). Fouquet and Briout killed 15 June 1944 in Crux la Ville, Nièvre after encountering a German detachment. Juillet arrested and deported to Mauthausen-Gusen-II, died 12 March 1945. Léger together with Fernand Dutour shot 27 May 1944 by two French Gestapo agents (Leneveu and Demay).
- HARRY-15: Jean Gosset, André Rousse and Gaston Legrand dropped on DZ Ouragan near Assé-le-Boisne Sarthe on 30 Dec. Objectives: Gosset took over the leadership of the Cohors-Asturies despite being badly injured in the parachute drop. He was arrested by the Gestapo 24 April 1944 in Rennes and sent via Compiègne to Neuengamme and died there 21 Dec 1944.

=== 1944 ===
Summarized from 'Table of History of agents In/Exfiltrated Year 1944 - table 34.5 by P. Tillet'

- MARC-1: Gérard Hennebert, Eugene Bornier, Paul Leistenschneider(DMR-R1), Jean Chaboud and Paul Olivier dropped on DZ Goeland near Ychoux, Landes on 4 Jan 1944. Objectives: Hennebert to replace André Déglise-Favre as head of SAP in R5 section (Limoges). Bornier to SAP R2 (Marseille - Nice) as deputy. Leistenschneider, Chabord & Olivier deployed as sabotage instructors for R3 (Perpignan-Nîmes). Chaboud caught and shot 31 July 1944 in St-Guillaume, Isère. Olivier arrested (with Léon Freychet) 3 May 1944 in Rodez, committed suicide.
- JOHN-38 / IAM MISSION - UNION-1: Henry Thackthwaite, Peter Ortiz and Camille Monnier dropped on DZ Agonie near Eymeux Drôme on 6 Jan 1944. Objective: To assess resistance capability in Vercors plateau region. Monnier was betrayed to the Gestapo in St Marcellin, Isère and caught red-handed with his radio, he was executed 22 May 1944.
- SF4: André Barbier and Alfred Lebosquain du Plessis dropped near Sarrat du Pelat, Aude on 8 Jan. Objectives: Barbier to R3 (Languedoc-Roussillon) as Operations Officer, Lebosquian du Plessis to R4 ( Sud-Ouest) as Operations Officer. Barbier was injured in the drop and hospitalized in Carcassonne. He was arrested on 11 May 1944 in Toulouse but escaped at Sorgues railway station on 18 Aug 1944.
- PETER-16/VANILLE: Didier Faure-Beaulieu dropped on DZ Sarrail near Louroux-Hodement, Allier on 27 Jan. Objective: Early stage implementation of operation Vanille (aka Blackmail), this was to 'persuade' key French industry owners that controlled sabotage by SOE agents and thereby aiding the Allies might be preferable to indiscriminate bombing.
- MARC-1/VARLIN: Edmond Leylavergne, Maxime Malfettes and Maurice Escoute dropped on DZ Goeland near Ychoux, Landes on 27 Jan. Objective: SKF factory at Ivry-sur-Seine as part of the expanded 'Blackmail' operation (above), working under the command of Marcel Suarès. Escoute was fatally injured in the drop and died in a Bordeaux hospital 29 Jan.
- PAUL-9: André Jamme, Georges Héritier, Georges Vaudin, Guy Lacoeuille (all sabotage instructors) plus Maurice Bougon and André Touron dropped on DZ Chénier near Pisselièvre, Lot 28 Jan.
- BOB-73: Pierre-Emile Manuel, Henri Pergaud, Robert Casse and Robert Aubiniere dropped on DZ Anjou near Auberive, Haute Marne 28 Jan 1944. Manuel arrested in Paris 19 March 1944, deported to Auschwitz 31 July 1944 no further record. Casse arrested 1 March 1944, deported via Compiegne to Auschwitz then Flossenburg/Janowitz, died 15 Dec 1944. Aubiniere arrested 13 April 1944 in Lille, deported to Sachsenhausen then Ravensbruck, liberated by Russians 29 April 1945.
- JOHN-25/ACTION/CIRCONFERENCE: Marguerite Petitjean, Yvon Morandat, René Obadia and Eugène Déchelette dropped on DZ Ajusteur near St Uze, Drôme on 29 Jan. Objective: Set up ACTION network and prepare for D-day.
- MARC-1B/ADVOCAT: Léon Nautin dropped on DZ Goeland near Ychoux, Landes on 4 Feb. Objective - Nautin to take up post as head of operations for R4 (Toulouse) region. Arrested by French police in Bordeaux and handed to the Germans, Nautin committed suicide (cyanide) on 11 Feb 1944.
- BLUDGEON/UNION-1: 7 passengers - Pierre Fourcaud, Antoine Salles, Louis-Laurent Burdet, Jacques Lecompte-Boinet, Elvire (SOE-DF), Pierre du Passage (ORA) and 'Y" (SOE-T?) landed on LZ Orion near Bletterans, Jura on 8 Feb 1944. Fourcaud to join Thackthwaite & Ortiz to lead Union team, he was arrested at Albertville, Savoie and injured while trying to escape. He was transferred to Chambéry and escaped 2 Aug 1944 and returned to UK via Spain. Lecompte-Boinet retook his position as head of CDLR. Burdet to become 'chef de région' or DMR of R2 (Marseille area).
- PETER 16B: Danielle Reddé and Yves Labous dropped on DZ Sarrail near Louroux-Hodement, Allier on 8 Feb. Objective - Reddé to rendezvous with 'Latin' and 'Phénicien' (? Gustave André) in Lyon to work as a wireless operator, she is thought to be the first female RF agent to be dropped into France. Labous was arrested 13 March 1944 and deported via Compiègne to Buchenwald, liberated 5 May 1945.
- (UNKNOWN-1): Yves le Corvaisier dropped near Lectoure, Gers on 10 Feb. Objective - Wireless operator for Jacques Lecuyer R2 (Marseille area).
- PETER-16C/ IAM MISSION - ASYMPTOTE: Forest Yeo-Thomas, Maurice Lostrie and Robert Koening dropped on DZ Sarrail near Louroux-Hodement, Allier on 24 Feb. Objective - Yeo-Thomas to attempt, with the help of Brigitte Friang, to rescue Pierre Brossolette (arrested 3 Feb 1944 and being held in Rennes prison). Brossolette killed himself while trying to escape, Yeo-Thomas and Friang were arrested 21 March 1944. Friang was injured during her arrest and having been tortured sent to Ravensbrück, she was liberated at the end of the war.
- HARRY-15B/FANTASSIN: Jeanne Bohec dropped on DZ Ouragan near Assé-le-Boisne, Sarthe on 29 Feb. Objective - Train Résistance members in Brittany ahead of D-day landings, she cycled around isolated Breton farms instructing groups of saboteurs, gaining the nickname "la plastiqueuse à bicyclette".
- BOB-141/DE RETZ: Jean Sriber and Guy Fassiaux dropped on DZ De Retz near La Forestière, Marne on 3 Feb. Objective - Recon mission of V1 rocket launch ramps. Sriber and Fassiaux arrested 19 March in Paris; Sriber liberated after his deportation train was halted in Brussels by the Allies 3 Sept 1944, Fassiaux deported 1 May 1944 and repatriated 22 May 1945.
- BOB-136&141/1: Georges Ballini dropped on DZ Babylone, Marne 2 March.
- (UNKNOWN-2): Cpt Roger Mitchell (plus female WT) by ground via Gibraltar, Spain and into France 2 March 1944. Objective - Contact local Maquis to roll out Jedburgh Plan.
- JOHN-23: Two unknown female agents. Drop aborted due to no contact with reception team near Montpellier on 3 March 1944. RAF Halifax shot down over Bernay, Eure, the two agents jumped, of the crew of seven, five killed, two captured and POW.
- BOB-73B: François Baloche, Jean-Marie Molinie, Alexandre Klatama and Robert Caille dropped on DZ Anjou near Auberieve, Haute Marne on 15 March 1944. Objective - Sabotage of factories in Paris region.
- SEPTIMUS I: Gilbert Médéric-Védy, Alexandre de Courson de la Villeneuve, Pierre Jolinon and Charles Akoun (plus 2 SOE-DF agents) landed by sea at de Vilin Izella near Beg-an-Fry, Finistère on 17 March 1944. Médéric-Védy replaced Roger Coquoin as lead of Ceux de la Libération. Médéric-Védy was arrested 21 March and committed suicide before Commissaire Fernand David of BS1 was able to fully interrogate him.
- PAUL-9: Charles Bernard Schlumberger, Pierre Haymann and Michel Couvreur dropped on DZ Chenier near Pisselièvre, Lot on 18 March 1944. Objective - Schlumberger to become head (DMR) of R4 (Lot et Garonne / Haute Pyrénées).
- SEPTIMUS-II: Henri Guillermin, Roland Pré and René Cornec (plus several F- and DF- section agents) landed by sea at de Vilin Izella near Beg-an-Fry, Finistère on 21 March. Objective - Guillermin to replace Emile Picard as SAP for R4 (Lot et Garonne / Haute Pyrénées), Pré to replace (temp) Claude Bouchinet-Serreulles.
- JOHN-75: Jean-Pierre Cabouat dropped on DZ Acier near Aubenas, Ardèche on 22 March. Objective - Cabouat returning to post as DMR Assistant (Region A - aka Tom or Lille area).
- DICK-45: Alix Michelle d'Unienville and Jacques Brunschwig dropped on DZ Dentelle near Beauvais, Lot et Cher on 31 March. Objective - d'Unienville carried 40m Francs to Paris for the Résistance (she was secretary to Pré). On D-day, she was arrested by the SD, tortured, imprisoned in Fresnes and deported 15 August 1944, she escaped from the train at Méry-sur-Marne the following day.
- ORME/BAMBOU: Fernand Gouguenheim, Armand Douhet, Jacques Chimot and René Cureau landed on LZ near Les Fontaines, Indre et Loire on 31 March 1944.
- TABOURET: Michel Lancesseur and Dominique Ferracci dropped on DZ Tabouret near Beaumont de Pertuis, Vaucluse 1 April 1944. Objective - to prepare south and east Maquis for Allied landing in Provence. Lancesseur arrested 15 July by Dünker Delage (Section IV of the Sipo-SD), after being interrogated he was imprisoned at Baumettes and betrayed by an inmate, he along with 28 other Résisitance members were executed on 18 July 1944 in the Signes forest, Var.
- HARRY 28B: René Carrel and Jean-Marie Couedelo dropped 3 km (1.9 mi) from DZ Aurone near St-Léonard-des-Parcs, Orne on 9 April 1944.
- TOM-44A: Antoine Baille dropped on DZ Blériot near Les Blanches Terres, Aisne on 9 April 1944.
- DICK-51: Unknown agent (aka Uppert aka Orgon) dropped on DZ Taupe near Buxeuil, Aube 9 April 1944.
- PAUL 9B: Jean-Baptiste Giorgetti dropped on DZ Chenier near Pisselièvre Lot on 10 April 1944. Giorgetti was able to successfully attack several sabotage targets including the 'poudrière' (Explosives factory?) of Toulouse. Giorgetti was betrayed by Georges Pujol, injured while being arrested and after briefly being treated at the Purpan hospital, imprisoned at Saint-Michel. He was transferred to Castelmaurou and handed to the 2nd Reserve Battalion of the SS Das Reich division. On 27 June 1944 he, along with 14 other Résistance members, were driven to the Bois de la Reulle and forced to dig their own graves before being executed.
- JOHN 38A: Jean-François Paris, Henri Benhamou, Roger Olive and David (X) dropped on DZ Agonie near Eymeux, Drôme on 10 April 1944. Olive joined René Obadia in the R2 region (Provence-Alpes-Côte d'Azur) and took part in several sabotage operations as part of the Plan Vert. On 17 July, Olive along with Obadia were caught in an ambush by the Gestapo in Aix-en-Provence, Olive died of his injuries but was mis-identified as Marcel Rouget.
- JOHN-25A: Émile Loison dropped on DZ Ajusteur near St Uze, Drôme on 21 April 1944.
- PAUL-9C: François Muller dropped on DZ Chenier near Pisselièvre, Lot on 24 April 1944. Objective - WT operator for Jacques d'Avout d'Aurerstaedt.
- JOHN-67A: James Leopold Salmon dropped on DZ Bugeaud/Ruche near Châtillon-sur- Chalaronne, Ain on 24 April 1944.
- ORGANIST: Robert Dupuis landed on LZ Hercule near Velles, Indre on 30 April 1944. Objective - Deputy for COPA (Centre d'Operations de Parachutages et d'Atterrissages) region A.
- JOHN-111: Jean Cendral dropped on DZ Temple near Allex, Drôme on 5 May 1944. Objective - to join WT team in Revol, Britière in Saint-Agnan en Vercors. From the coded message sent, three planes (B24s of the USAAF Carpetbaggers) dropped Cendral along with 80m Francs and a quantity of arms.
- PAUL-90: Maurice Deligne dropped on DZ Chenier near Pisselièvre, Lot on 7 May 1944.
- PETER-79A / IAM MISSION - BENJOIN: Frederick Cardozo (SOE-F), Bernard Gouy, Jean Trollet and Jacques Lebaigue (OSS) dropped on DZ Plongeon-1 near La Vesseyre, Cantal on 7 May 1944. Objective - an Inter Allied Mission to arm the Résistance in the Cantal department.
- DONALD-64: Jean Brunet, Raymond Fauveau and Jean Rémy dropped on DZ Caseine near St Mardis-en-Othe, Aube on 8 May 1944.
- MINEUR: Aubin Clément, Henri Hirigoyen, Suzanne Bonnand, Désiré Browaeys and (possibly) Jacques Rosenthal landed on LZ Planete near Les Fontaines, Indre et Loire 9 May 1944.
- GORGE: Dr Henri Rosencher landed by sea at Morgiou Bay near Cassis, Bouches du Rhône on 13 May 1944. Objective - to join IAM team led by Henri Chanay and organise health service of Maquis in Southern Zone and rescue posts in Vercors and Drôme. Rosencher was arrested 25 July 1944 in Monestier de Clermont and interned in Grenoble, then Lyon. He was deported eventually to Dachau and repatriated 16 May 1945.
- DONALD-64A: Robert Rodrigues, Raymond Nagel, Antoine Levasseur and Denis Masson dropped on DZ Caseine/Taupe near Lisière des Bois, Aube on 22 May 1944. Objective - Plan Tortue.
- DONALD-7: Claude Geisenberger, Yves Lebigre and Gérard Gaussen dropped on DZ Devidoire near Nangis, Seine et Marne on 22 May 1944. Objective - Plan Tortue.
- IAM MISSION - CITRONELLE-2A: Jacques Chavannes, Marc Racine and Lucien Goetghebeur dropped on DZ Astrologie near Vieux Moulins de Thilay, Ardennes on 5 June 1944. Objective establish Résistance in the Ardennes area - DZ Astrologie had received 88 containers of arms on 28 May.
- 6 June 1944 Invasion of Northern France (Operation Neptune or D-Day)
- DONALD-6C: Jean Pietri, Pierre Sonneille and X Merot dropped on DZ Talon near Epineuse, Oise on 6 June 1944.
- DONALD-5: René Gaumondie (plus 2 OSS agents) dropped on DZ Diapason/Digitale near Villiers sous Grez, Seine et Marne on 7 June 1944.
- JOHN-87A: Jean Rosenthal, Maurice Bourges-Maunoury and Paul Rivière (with Leon Ball (OSS) and 176m Francs) dropped on DZ Metacarpe near Ringy sur Arroux, Saône et Loire on 7 June 1944. Objective - to assure liaison between Allied forces and Résistance.
- (UNKNOWN-3): Guy Vivier dropped by mistake on DZ Adjoint near Mont Gerbier de Jonc, Ardeche instead of DZ Plongeon in Cantal on 8 June 1944. Objective - DMR Deputy, to become DMR of R6 (Clermont-Ferrand area) after the arrest of Alexandre de Courson de la Villeneuve on 2 July 1944.
- YAMBO: Guy Lenfant and Marius Gaudemard landed by sea in Barcelona and crossed the border on foot, 11 June 1944. Objective - to contact 'Carlos' of CND Vic network and set up transmission network in Ariège, Haute-Garonne & Tarn departments.
- SUNFLOWER-7: Anatole Willk dropped on DZ Baleine near St Marcel, Morbihan on 13 June.
- TABOURET/CHICKEN: Joseph Meistermann, Louis Pacaud and Jean Maurice Muthular d'Errecalde (OSS) dropped on DZ Tabouret near La Motte d'Aigues, Vaucluse on 13 June 1944. Objective - d'Errecalde to go to R2 region (Provence) to report on the conflict between Corps francs de la Libération (CFL) and FFI. He was sent to St Tropez with the intent of taking a speedboat to Algiers, betrayed by the double agent Maurice Deydier Seignon de Possel. Imprisoned and tortured in Baumettes, he was executed along with 8 other Résistance fighters in the Bois de Signes massacre on 12 August 1944.
- PECTORAL: Jean-Paul Vaucheret, William Massey and Andre Lucaire dropped on DZ Acanthe near Mont Gerbier, Ardèche on 13 June 1944.
- DONALD-22A: Jean Vimont-Vicary dropped on DZ Caricature near La Grande Breuille, Yonne on 14 June 1944. Objective - Vimont-Vicary to be deputy of Pierre Deshayes BOA R1, he was KIA at Nouvion-en-Thiérache, Ainse on 2 September 1944.
- PETER-38C: Maxime Plault and Pierre Sylvian Bonnidal dropped near Vallon Sully, Allier on 14 June 1944.
- PERCY-13: Claude Gros dropped on DZ near Les Bois, Ciron, Indre on 18 June 1944. Objective - Gros to organise Scévolles Maquis (Vienne) as Operations head then DMR of B2 (Poitiers area).
- PERCY-19 / IAM MISSION BERGAMOTTE:: Jacques Robert, Jean Gorodiche and Joseph (?David) Gagliardi (plus Jack Thomas Shannon (OSS)) dropped on DZ Pension near Nadapeyras, Creuse on 27 June 1944. Objective - Organise and equip local maquis groups, execute sabotage targets, protect infrastructure from retreating Axis damage and supply medical facilities for maquis.
- TANDEM / MISSION-2: Henri Hostein and Roger Sautereau dropped on DZ Tandem near Devesset, Ardèche on 28 June 1944. Objective - to work with Jean-Paul Vaucheret
- (UNKNOWN-4): Albert Glatigny landed by sea (? Normandy) 28 June 1944.
- PETER-16F: Charles Jean François Marie Le Bihan dropped on DZ Sarrail near Louroux-Hodement, Allier on 1 July 1944. Objective - DMR for R6 (Cantal area).
- DONALD-19B / VERVEINE: André Lemaitre, André Michon, Noel Colli and Germaine Adrienne Heim dropped on DZ Lavis near Donzy, Nièvre on 5 July 1944. Objective - Heim as WT for Verveine (SAS Operation).
- PERCY-7F: Jean Sibileau and Josiane Somers dropped on DZ Negus near Liglet, Indre on 6 July 1944. Objective - Sibileau for Scévolles Maquis, Somers as WT for Claude Gros (See Percy-13). Sibileau led the sabotage of the Nantes-Paris railway line on 4/5 Aug 1944, he was KIA 28 Aug 1944 in the Sibileau forest. Somers was one of the youngest SOE agents (aged 20) and their youngest female agent. She married Claude Gros in the autumn of 1944 in Westminster, London.
- IAM MISSION EUCALYPTUS: BCRA agents: Adrien Conus, Philippe Saillard, Gaston Pellat, Max Stern, Fernand G. Viat & Henri Bourgeois (plus 5 SOE-F) were landed on LZ Izemore, near Nantua, Ain on 6 July 1944. Objective - Evaluate the situation in the Vercors, arm and instruct the maquis in guerrilla tactics. Conus joined the Vercors maquis and later volunteered for an operation with the Oisian maquis where on the 23 July he was captured by the Germans. Conus narrowly escaped being executed and rejoined his team. Lt Col Viat was awarded the DSO following his actions in preventing 35000 retreating German troops crossing the Loire at Nevers and blocking the Belfort gap.
- MISSION 2/11: Jean Tournissa, Yves Morineaux, Paul Emile Scherrer-Sauvage, Francis Billon and René Abily dropped on DZ Taille-Crayon near Vassieux en Vercors, Drôme on 6 July. Objective - to prepare Vassieux (?) airfield for Dakota C17. The airfield was completed but overrun by German gliders on July 21. Tourissa was wounded during the attack, captured and tortured. He succeeded in escaping but was killed on 28 August near St Nazaire-en-Royans. Billon broke his leg during the parachute drop and was hospitalised at St Martin-en-Vercors. This was over-run by the Germans and the patients were moved to the Grotte de la Luire near St Agnan-en-Vercors. They were discovered and Billon along with seven patients were executed on July 28, 1944.
- JOHN-60/CANELLE: André Jarrot, René Ancel, Pierre Bouchet, Pierre Guilhemon and Raymond Gazeau dropped on DZ Trousseau near Gigny sur Saône on 9 July 1944. Objective - Jarrot to become DMR for Saône et Loire region.
- JOHN-22A/GINGEMBRE: Raymond Basset, Pierre Boutoule, Marcel Reveilloux, Dominique Zanini & Michel Castets dropped on DZ Saphir near Les Croisettes, Rhône on 9 July 1944. Objective - to organise and arm Résistance groups to the west of Lyon and prevent German troops retreating up the Rhône valley.
- (UNKNOWN-5): Pierre Paul Marie Malafosse dropped at unknown location possibly in the Haute Pyrenees on 9 July 1944. Objective - Presidency of the Béziers liberation committee.
- TERRASSE: Pierre Blanchard and Edouard Pays dropped on DZ Terrasse near La Burguiere, Laissac, Aveyron on 11 July 1944. Objective - to assist René Dinomais.
- VENTRILOQUIST-39: Charles Lonchambon dropped on DZ near Nouan le Fuzelier, Loir et Cher on 16 July 1944. Objective - Lonchambon to replace Albin Chalandon as head of 2nd Company of Lorris Maquis.
- LONDON-462: Louis Parayre, François Granry,? Lavigne and Michel Coste dropped on DZ Armateur near Lagarde d'Alte, Vaucluse on 17 July 1944.
- EARTH/PEUPLIER: François Chatelin, Etienne Jean Schricke, Jean Philippe Lemaire, Roger Reverchon, Jacques Albert Palle and Marcel Bouche dropped on DZ Peuplier on the Poêt-Laval Dieulefit plain, Drôme on 17 July 1944.
- GILES-2: Ambroisse Bossard, Marcel Siche and Jean Bernard dropped on DZ Cerise near Penity-St-Laurent, Finistère on 17 July 1944. Objective - to assist in the Jedburgh Giles team to organise resistance in Finistère. Bossard drowned in an accident at Plouguerneau, Finistère 22 Oct 1944.
- HARRY-42A: Jean François Clouët des Pesruches and Pierre Bachelet dropped on DZ Caramel near Ruillé, Sarthe on 17 July 1944. Objective - Clouët des Pesruches to become DMR of Loire, Anjou and Normandy areas and liberated La Flèche on 10 August 1944.
- IAM AMICT-2: Paul Emile, Robert Boucart and René Hébert (with John Goldsmith of SOE-F) dropped on DZ Armateur near Lagarde d'Apte, Vaucluse on 18 July 1944. Objective - to join Gonzaque Corbin de Mangoux as part of Ventoux Maquis management.
- ?ALOES: Michel Pichard and Jean Leroux dropped (?) in Morbihan, Finistère area on 20 July 1944. Objective - to prepare for Aloes Mission arrival by liaison with Pierre-Louis Bourgoin (4th SAS).
- TENERIFFE: Louis Ludovic de Redo Vareuil and Paul Baudry landed on LZ Le Blanc Airfield, Indre on 27 July 1944.
- UNKNOWN-x: Dominique Hepp, Alain Guynot de Boismenu with 5 French Officers dropped on DZ Framboise near Comps, Drôme on 31 July 1944. Objective - To supervise Drôme Maquis
- PAUL-104: Marcel Tardy and Abel Moreau dropped on DZ Iceberg near Brugnens, Gers on 6 August 1944.
- TOM-54: Raoul Dal Col dropped on DZ Cantine near Meraulieux, Aisne on 6 August 1944.
- PERCY-29A: (X) Lefranc and Raymond Cara dropped on DZ Aglaé near Saulnay, Indre on 6 August 1944. Objective - to assist the Abilly Maquis.
- MACHETTE: André Dammaw (or Dammann?), Marcel André, René Dolmaire and Roger Mallard landed on LZ Aigle near La Montagne, Ain on 7 August 1944. Objective - to support various Maquis in the region. Dolmaire was KIA 28 August 1944 fighting with the Corlay Maquis (Saône-et-Loire) at Nanton.
- POIGNARD: Germaine Gruner, Jean Rosselli, Prosper Yafil, Maurice Revel and Emile Bahra landed on LZ Longeron near Boueilh-Boueilho-Lasque, Pyrénées Atlantiques on 10 August 1944.
- PROUST: Charles Gajan dropped on DZ Proust near Condom d'Aubrac, Aveyron on 10 August 1944.
- JOHN-133A: André Jarrot dropped on DZ Fouine near La Chapelle de Bragny, Saône et Loire on 10 August 1944. Objective - DMR of Saône et Loire Maquis with US supplies.
- (UNKNOWN-6): Jean Edgard Pitre, Frederick Cardozo, Bernard Gouy, Jacques Lebaigue and Jean Trollet dropped on DZ Veilleuse near Deux Verges, Cantal on 11 August 1944.
- CIVETTE: Louis Georget, Georges Medioni, Henri Clastère and Paul Bodhaine dropped on DZ Carotte near Sains-Richaumont, Aisne on 11 August 1944. Objective - to destroy V1 and V2 installation equipment in Amiens and Doulens areas. Medioni killed in the drop. Georget arrested in Bruay sur l'Escaut 24 August 1944, deported to Dachau 1 September. Liberated 28 May 1945.
- BOB-224: Michel Pichard, Cécile Chassain de Marcilly and Maurice Roschbach dropped on DZ Hotel near Rivière les Fosses, Haute Marne on 11 August 1944. Objective - Pichard (DMD Haute-Marne) to organise air drops with local FFI Chief of Staff.
- PETER-83: Charles Hora and Henri Hubert dropped on 11 August by US Carpetbaggers operation 1579, unknown location.
- TANDEM: Jean-Robert Lefèvre, Elle Benchetrit and Lt Denis dropped on DZ Tandem near Devesset, Ardèche on 12 August 1944.
- TRICYCLE: Jean Forman, Jean Liucci, Constant Delaporte and Guy Champagnol dropped on DZ Tricycle near Engayresque, Aveyron on 13 August 1944. Objective - to contact Mission Arete.
- DONALD-22E: Henri Guarracino, Xavier Rouxin and Georges Bridon dropped on DZ Caracature near La Grande Breuille, Yonne on 13 August 1944. Objective - to join Lt Col Fernand Georges Viat for Mission Verveine.
- 15 August 1944 Invasion of Southern France (Operation Dragoon)
- CITRONELLE-2B: Henri Richard de Vesvrotte and Robert Georgin (with Jedburgh Andrew team) dropped on DZ Astrologie near Vieux Moulins, Thilay, Ardennes on 15 August 1944.
- (UNKNOWN-7): Jacques Chaban-Delmas landed on LZ near St Breil near Le Mans, Sarthe on 15 August 1944. Chaban-Delmas was nominated Délégué Militaire National (DMN) in May 1944 and effectively responsible for military co-ordination between the FFI and Inter-Allied high command.
- JOHN-67C: Pierre Jouanno, Louis Franzini and Paul Leistenschneider (plus 1 aka Aspro) dropped on DZ Bugeaud / Ruche near Châtillon-sur-Chalaronne, Ain on 16 August 1944. Objective - Leistenschneider to be DMR for R1 (Lyon).
- PETER-89A: Jean Edgard Pitre as part of 20-man OSS/OG team Lindsey dropped over two nights 16 & 17 August 1944 on DZ Deglane near Cisternes, Puy de Dome. Objective - to assist local Maquis.
- PERCY-13G: Georges Lustac dropped on DZ Aglaé near Les Rosés, Indre on 16 August 1944. Objective - to contact Eugène Déchelette DMR for R5 (Limousin).
- BOB-256: Max Noirez and Jean Marcel Culas (plus Jedburgh Bunny team) dropped on DZ Amarrante near Boussenois, Côte d'Or on 17 August 1944. Objective - Culas as Head of Flight Operations for Doubs - Jura area.
- PERCY-47: Charles-Joachim Polak dropped on DZ Loup near Péret-Bel-Air, Corrèze on 17 August 1944. Objective - to be Deputy DMR for region B (Bordeaux).
- CITRONELLE-2: S/Lt (Aloyse Jean?) Shiltz (aka Tétraèdre) and Jean-François Alix dropped on DZ Astrologie near Les Vieux Moulins de Thilay, Ardennes on 27 August 1944.
- MESSENGER-35A: Lt Col de Reald and Étienne Burin des Roziers (R-D) dropped on Dz Ognon near Buthiers, Haute Saône on 27 August 1944.BBC messages #914
- TRICYCLE: Camille Lancel, Herbert Broussse, Lucien Leger and Gilbert Siorat dropped on DZ Tricycle near Engayresque Aveyron on 29 August 1944.
- (UNKNOWN-8): Edmond Brunet, Pierre Bonnet, Georges Edouard, Pierre Morruzzi and Maurice Decam dropped on DZ Lee near Philigon, Drôme on 29 August 1944.
- DAUNTSEY: Charles Béraudier (plus 4 unknown persons) landed on LZ Junot near Arbigby, Ain on 31 August 1944.
- DONALD-22F: René Carrel dropped on DZ near La Grande Breuille, Yonne on 31 August 1944.
- TANDEM?: James Chaillat (plus 5 agents) dropped on DZ Tandem near Devesset, Ardèche on 1 Sept 1944. Objective - Maquis management.
- BOB-279: Robert Bloc and Marguerite Gianello dropped on DZ Saltimbanque near Haillainville, Vosges on 1 Sept 1944. Bloc as Deputy BOA for region C (Châlon-sur-Marne).
- ROVING / GUNNER: Jean Gorodiche landed on LZ Feytiat near Limoges on 2 Sept 1944.
- MARC-19B: X (aka Margrave), Jean Volny Richaud, Claude Delaveau, Michel Vautrin, Claude Albenois and Paul Verges dropped on DZ Pommard near Souzy, Vienne on 4 Sept 1944. Objectives: Volny Richaud to Maquis in R5 (Limoges), Albenois to Action B and Verges to support Maquis in Scevolle/Vienne area.
- WELDER-2: Exfiltration of Henri Romans-Petit and Denis Johnson from LZ west of Halms near St Savin, Vienne on 4 Sept 1944.
- PETER-38G: Jean-Marie Wagner, Gaston Viguier and Jean Berberian dropped on DZ near Vallon en Sully, Allier on 5 Sept 1944. Objectives - Wager for DMR R6 (Clermont Ferrand) to assist local maquis.
- FAILSWORTHY-I: Gérard Levy landed on LZ Longeron near Bouilh, Pyrénées Atlantiques on 5 Sept 1944.
- MARC-19: IAM Shinoile (pt-1) Anatole Willk dropped on DZ Pommard near Souzy, Vienne on 7 Sept 1944. Objective - Lead the clear out remaining Germans in St Nazaire and La Rochelle.
- PERCY-8B: Jean Louis Buissière-Paccard, Jacques Engels, Robert Gaitz, René Marbot, Jacques Naturel, Pierre Cera & Pierre Wahl dropped on DZ Gazelle (aka) Guéret / St-Laurent airfield, Creuse.
- MIXER: Etienne Versaud (plus 4) landed on LZ Izmemore-Austin near Nantua, Ain on 8 Sept 1944. Objective - Flight Operations.
- PERCY-65: Jean Coste (plus X aka Maleter and Y aka Acromion) dropped on DZ near Soubrebost, Creuse on 9 Sept 1944.
- HOUSING-1: Léon Pelosse (plus 30 BCRA Officers) landed by sea at Sables d'Olonne, Vendée on 9 Sept 1944. Objective - (IAM Shinoile) to assist in liberation of St Nazaire pocket.
- HECKLER-4A: Jean Dischamps dropped on DZ Bream near Chambon sur Lignon, Haute Loire on 11 Sept 1944.
- (UNKNOWN-9): Maurice Barthelemy landed at Orly Paris on 11 Sept 1944. Objective - IAM Shinoile to create 1st Mobile Group of FFI.
- MARC-19: Jean Boven, Pierre Rabeau (plus 1 agent) dropped on DZ Pommard near Souzy, Vienne on 15 Sept 1944. Objective - IAM Shinoile support.
- FOWLMERE-1 (2 RF agents), FOWLMERE-2 (3 RF agents), FARSLEY (4 RF agents) - 16-19 Sept 1944.
- DULLINGHAM-3: Jean Marius Guillomot (plus 2 agents) landed on Francazal airfield, Toulouse on 21 Sept 1944. Objective - to join IAM Shinoile.
- NEWMARKET-1: 2 RF Agents landed (unknown LZ) by Lysander of 161 Sqn.
- (UNKNOWN-10): Cecil Vincent Davin landed by sea near St Nazaire 1 Oct 1944. Objective - IAM Shinoile.

** SOE-F and SOE-RF sections were merged into the État-major des Forces Française de l'Intérieur (EMFFI) after D-Day, operations from late 1944 fell under this title and become less easy to separate.

== Cross-reference tables ==
Agent	Operation	Biographical notes to 1945
ABEILLE, Valentin	Battering Ram /Tortue	Arrested in Paris, May 31, 1944, and died of his injuries 2 June 1944, age 36
ABILY, René	Mission 2/11	
ABOULKER, José	Sword	
AKOUN, Charles	Septimus-1	
ALBENOIS, Claude Paul Marie	Marc-19B	
ALIX, Jean-Louis François	Citronelle-2	
ALLARD, Jean-Baptiste	Battering Ram /Tortue	
ALLAINMAT, André	Dastard	Arrested 6 Sept 1942, Imprisoned at Mauthausen until May 1945
ANCEL, René	John-60/Canelle	
ANDRÉ, Marcel	Machette	
AUBINIERE, Robert	Bob-73	Arrested 13 April 1944, Imprisoned at Ravensbruck until April 1945
AYRAL, Jean	Roach/Mackerel	KIA 22 August 1944, aged 23
BACHELET, Pierre	Harry-42A	
BAHRA, Emile	Poignard	
BAILLE, Antoine	Tom-44A	
BALLINI, Georges	1 Bob-136 2 Bob-141/1	
BALOCHE, François	Bob-73B	
BARBIER, André	SF4	
BARRO, Robert	Bloater/Roach	Arrested 10 March 1944, Imprisoned at Buchenwald until April 1945
BARTHELEMY, Maurice	IAM Shinoile	
BASSET, Raymond	1 John-26 2 Armada 3 John 22A/Gingembre	
BAUDRY, Paul	Teneriffe	
BENCHETRIT, Elle	Tandem	
BENHAMOU, Henri	John-38A	
BÉRAUDIER, Charles	Dauntsey	
BERBERIAN, Jean	Peter-38G	
BERNARD, Jean	Giles-2	
BERTRAND, Henri	Crayfish/Brill	
BILLARD, Albert	Bob-74	
BILLON, Françoise	Mission 2 /11	Executed 28 July 1944, aged 24
BINGEN, Jacques	Popgun	Suicide 12 May 1944, aged 36
BLANCHARD, Pierre	Terrasse	
BLOC, Robert	Bob-279	
BODHAINE, Paul	Pilchard	
BOHEC, Jeanne	Harry-15B/Fantassin	
BONNAMI, André	Bob-16/Ponton/Soldat/Trainer-24	KIA 17 Dec 1944, age 38
BONNAND, Suzanne	Mineur	
BONNET, Pierre	(Unknown-8)	
BONNIDAL, Pierre Sylvian	Peter-38C	
BONNIER, Claude	Water Pistol	Suicide 9 Feb 1944, aged 47
BORNIER, Eugene	Marc-1	
BOROSH, Henry	Whitebait/Prawn/Gurnard	
BOSSARD, Ambroisse	Giles-2	Drowned 22 Oct 1944, age 25
BOUCART, Robert	IAM Amict-2	
BOUCHE, Marcel	Earth/Peuplier	
BOUCHET, Pierre	John-60/Canelle	
BOUCHET, Xavier	Perch-4/Robalo/Nautilus/Shrimp	
BOUCHINET-SERREULLES, Claude	Knuckle-duster	
BOUGON, Maurice	Paul-9	
BOULAGE, Bernard	Perch-4/Robalo/Nautilus/Shrimp	Died in Mauthausen Concentration Camp April 1945, aged 33
BOULLOCHE, André	Battering Ram /Tortue	Imprisoned at Auschwitz and Buchenwald until April 1945
BOURDAT, Louis	Dace/Cyprus/Hornbeam	KIA 15 June 1942, aged 34
BOURGEOIS, Henri	IAM Eucalyptus	
BOURGES-MAUNOURY, Maurice	1 Tank-8 2 John-87A	
BOUTOULE, Pierre	1 Clam 2 John-60/Canelle	Imprisoned at St Paul Prison Lyon until April 1944
BOUYJOU-CORDIER, Daniel	Roach/Mackerel	
BOVEN, Jean	Marc-19	
BRAULT, Gérard	Minnow	
BRIANT, Francois	Roach, Mackerel	Imprisoned at Buchenwald until May 1945
BRIDON, Georges	Donald-22E	
BRIOUT, Pierre	Patchouli	KIA 15 June 1944, age 29
BROSSOLETTE, Pierre	1 Python 2 Atala 3 Bomb/Serin/Marie-Claire	Killed himself by jumping through a 6th floor window March 22, 1944, age 40
BROUSSINE, Georges	Burgundy Tommy-gun	
BROUSSSE, Herbert	Tricycle	
BROWAEYS, Désiré	Mineur	
BRUNET, Edmond	(Unknown-8)	
BRUNET, Jean	Donald-64	
BRUNSCHWIG, Jacques	Helm/Marksman/Xavier	
BUISSIÈRE-PACCARD, Jean Louis	Percy-8B	
BURDET, Louis-Laurent	Bludgeon/Union-1	
BURIN DES ROZIERS, Étienne	Messenger-35A	
CABOUAT, Jean-Pierre	John-75	
CAILLE, Robert	Bob-73B	
CAILLEAUD, René	Roach-42/Bluefish/Dagger	
CAILLIAU, Michel	Shield	
CAMBAS, Lucien	Tank	
CAMORS, Jean-Claude	Sabine	KIA 11 Oct 1943, aged 24
CARA, Raymond	Percy-29A	
CARREL, René	1 Harry-28B 2 Donald-22F	
CARTIGNY, Jean-Louis	Torture	Executed 4 Feb 1942, aged 29
CASSE, Robert	Bob-73	Imprisoned at Auschwitz and Flossenburg/Janowitz, died Dec 1944, age 39
CASTETS, Michel	John-22A/Gingembre	
CAVAILLÈS, Jean	Liberty/Juliette	
CENDRAL, Jean	John-111	
CERA, Pierre	Percy-8B	
CHABAN-DELMAS, Jacques	(Unknown-7)	
CHABOUD, Jean	Marc-1	Executed by Gestapo 31 July 1944 age 30
CHAILLAT, James	Tandem	
CHAMPAGNOL, Guy	Tricycle	
CHAMPION, Émile	Orlando	
CHARLOT, André	Water Pistol	
CHASSAIN DE MARCILLY, Cécile	Bob-224	
CHATELIN, François	Earth/Peuplier	
CHAVANNES, Jacques	IAM Citronelle	
CHIMOT, Jacques	Orme/Bambou	
CLASTÈRE, Henri	1 Pilchard 2 Civette	
CLÉMENT, Aubin	Mineur	
CLOSON, Francis-Louis	1 Dogfish 2 Popgun	
CLOUËT DES PESRUCHES, Jean-François	1 Bob-30/Mariotte/Ampere/Galile 2 Harry-42A	
COLLI, Noel	Donald-19B	
COLONNA D'ISTRIA, Paulin	1 Scalp/Tube-V 2 Leg/Whiskers 3 Leg-I/Skin	
CONUS, Adrien	IAM Eucalyptus	
CORNEC, René	Septimus-II	
COSSONNEAU, Émile	Sten	KIA 11 Dec 1943, age 50
COSTE, Jean	Percy- 65	
COSTE, Michel	London-462	
COUEDELO, Jean-Marie	Harry-28B	
COURTAUD, Olivier Jacques	Goldfish	Imprisoned at Buchenwald until April 1945
COUVREUR, Michel	Paul-9	
CULAS, Jean Marcel	Bob-256	
CUREAU, René	Orme/Bambou	
D'ASTIER DE LA VIGERIE, Emmanuel	1 Buckler/Figue 2 Liberty/Juliette	
D'EYRAMES, Henri	Battering Ram /Tortue	
D'HARCOURT, Emmanuel	Bull/Mercure	
D'UNIENVILLE, Alix Michelle	Dick-45	
DAL COL, Raoul	Tom-54	
DAMIENS, Marcel	Garterfish	
DAMMAW (or DAMMANN?), André	Machette	
DAVIN, Cecil Vincent	(Unknown-10)	
DE CHEVEIGNÉ, Maurice	1 Salmon 2 Piquier/Iroquois/Flaman/Bob-62	
DE COURSON DE LA VILLENEUVE, Alexandre	Septimus-1	
DE KERGORLAY, Alain	Overcloud	
DE REDO VAREUIL, Louis Ludovic	Teneriffe	
DE VESVROTTE, Henri Richard	Citronelle-2B	
DECAM, Maurice	(Unknown-8)	
DÉCHELETTE, Eugène	John-25/Action/Circonference	
DÉGLISE-FAVRE, André	Bomb/Serin/Marie-Claire	Suicide 2 Nov 1943, aged 25
DELAPORTE, Constant	Tricycle	
DELATTRE, Robert	Nick Pernod	Died following torture 13 May 1943, aged 29
DELAVEAU, Claude	Marc-19B	
DELAYE, Pierre	Boreas-II/Boree/Mercure	Executed by Gestapo 11 May 1943 aged 41
DELESTRAINT, Charles	Sirene-II/Phalanx	Executed 19 April 1945, aged 66
DELIGNE, Maurice Armand	Paul-90	
DELIMAL, François	Bob-68/Bark/Faraday	Suicide 21 March 1944, aged 22
DEMOULIN, Pierre	Boreas-II/ Boree/ Mercure	
DENVIOLET, Georges	Skate/Squid	Imprisoned at Buchenwald, liberated spring 1945
DESCHAMPS, Henri	Shield	
DESGRANGES, André	Water Pistol	
DEWAVRIN, André	Seahorse	
DISCHAMPS, Jean	Heckler-4A	
DOLMAIRE, René	Machette	KIA 23 Aug 1944, aged 40
DONNADIEU, Roger	Barter-1	
DOUHET, Armand	Orme/Bambou	
DROUILH, Henri	Marc-1	KIA 17 Dec 1943, aged 52
DU PASSAGE, Pierre	Bludgeon/Union-1	
DUPUIS, Robert	Organist	
DUTOUR, Fernand	Bob-66/Lemniscate*	*Caught with Yves Léger, Executed by Gestapo 27 May 1944 aged 43
EDOUARD, Georges	(Unknown-8)	
EMILE, Paul	IAM Amict-2	
ENGELS, Jacques	Percy-8B	
ESCOUTE, Maurice	Marc-1/Varlin	KIA 29 Jan 1944, aged 39
FASSIAUX, Guy	Bob-141/De Retz	Deported 1 May 1944, repatriated 22 May 1945
FASSIN, Raymond	Robert/Perch/Mainmast-A Piquier/Iroquois/Flaman/Bob-62	Died en route to Neuengamme 12 Feb 1945, aged 31
FAURE-BEAULIEU, Didier	Peter-16/Vanille	
FAURE, François	Bridge/Isabelle/Cahors/Phalanx	Deported to Dachau, liberated 29 April 1945
FAUVEAU, Raymond	Donald-64	POW 15 March 1945 in Cambodia by Japanese, liberated August 1945
FERRACCI, Dominique	Tabouret	
FLOURIOT, Roger	Bloater/Roach-106	
FORMAN, Jean	1 Mainmast-B 2 Tricycle	
FOUQUAT, François	Bob-66/Leminscate	KIA 15 June 1944, aged 22
FOUR, Claudius	Sten	KIA 11 Dec 1943, aged 48
FOURCAUD, Pierre	Bludgeon/Union-1	
FRANZINI, Louis	1 Trojan Horse 2 John-67C	
FRAVAL, Louis Marie	Dogfish	
FURET, Jacques	Fabulous	Imprisoned at Buchenwald until April 1945
GAGLIARDI, Joseph (?David)	Percy-19 / IAM Bergamotte	
GAILLARD, Charles	Tank	
GAITZ, Robert	Percy-8B	
GAJAN, Charles	Proust	
GARLAND, Charles	1 Whitebait/Prawn/Gurnard 2 Porpoise/Prawn/Gurnard	Imprisoned at Eysses Prison until Jan 1944
GAUDEMARD, Marius	Yambo	
GAUDIN, Maxime	Pilchard	
GAUMONDIE, René	Donald-5	
GAUSSEN, Gérard	Donald-7	
GAZEAU, Raymond	John-60/Canelle	
GEISENBERGER, Claude	Donald-7	
GEORGET, Louis	Civette	Imprisoned at Dachau liberated May 1945
GEORGIN, Robert	Citronelle-2B	
GIANELLO, Marguerite	Bob-279	
GIANNESINI, Lt	Tube-VII/Scalop-III	
GIMPEL, Ernest	Patchouli	
GIORGETTI, Jean-Baptiste	Paul-9B	Executed 27 June 1944, aged 26
GLATIGNY, Albert	(Unknown-4)	
GOETGHEBEUR, Lucien	IAM Citronelle-2A	
GORODICHE, Jean	1 Percy-19 / IAM Bergamotte 2 Roving/Gunner	
GOSSET, Jean	Harry-15	Imprisoned at Neuengamme died 21 Dec 1944, age 32
GOUGUENHEIM, Fernand	Orme/Bambou	
GOUY, Bernard	1 Peter-79A/IAM Benjoin 2 (Unknown-6)	
GRANRY, François	London-462	
GRIES, Michel	1 Piqier/Iroquois/Flaman/Bob-62 2 Dory	
GROS, Claude	Percy-13	
GROUT DE BEAUFORT, Alain	Halibut	
GRUNER, Germaine	Poignard	
GUARRACINO, Henri	Donald-22E	
GUÉRIN, Jacques	Bob-30/Mariotte/Ampere/Galile	Deported to Dachau-Allach, liberated April 1945
GUILHEMON, Pierre	John-60/Canelle	
GUILLAUDOT, Maurice	Howitzer	
GUILLERMIN, Henri	Septimus-II	
GUILLOMOT, Jean Marius	Dullingham-3	
HAYMANN, Pierre	Paul-9	
HÉBERT, René	IAM Amict-2	
HEIM, Germaine Adrienne	Donald-19B/Verveine	
HELLIER, Jean-Baptiste	Dab/Sea-Urchin	Executed by Italian 7th Army Military Tribunal 15 July 1943 aged 37
HENNEBERT, Gérard	Marc-1	
HENTIC, Pierre	Nasturtium/Physician-31	Arrested and imprisoned Fresnes Jan 1944, deported to Dachau and liberated May 1945.
HÉRITIER, Georges	Paul-9	
HERITIER, Richard	1 Whitebait/Prawn/Gurnard 2 Porpoise/Prawn/Gurnard	Imprisoned at Sachsenhausen, escaped May 1945
HIRIGOYEN, Henri	Mineur	
HOLLEY, Jean	Minnow	Imprisoned at Mauthausen until May 1945
HORA, Charles	Peter-83	
HOSTEIN, Henri	Tandem/Mission-2	
HOUZE, René	Tommy-gun	
HUBERT, Henri	Peter-83	
ISRAEL, René	Pencilfish	
JAMME, André	Paul-9	
JANS, Pierre	1 Piqier/Iroquois/Flaman/Bob-62 2 Dory	Imprisoned at Loos until Sept 1944
JARROT, André	1 Armada 2 John-26/Lougre-A/Cotre-A/Armanda-III 3 John-60/Canelle 4 John-133A	
JICKELL, James Anthony	Dab/Sea-Urchin	
JOHNSON, Denis	Welder-2	
JOLINON, Pierre	Septimus-I	
JOLIVET, Jean	Bob-68/Bark/Faraday	Imprisoned at Neuengamme, died March 1945, aged (unknown)
JOUANNO, Pierre	John-67C	
JOVE, Rodolphe	Perch-4/Robalo/Nautilus/Shrimp	
JUILLET, Maurice	Bob-66/Leminscate	Imprisoned at Mauthausen, died March 1945, aged 31
JULITTE, Pierre	Chub	Imprisoned at Buchenwald until April 1945
KAMMERER, Jean-Charles	Battering Ram /Tortue	Deported 24 Oct 1944 to Schimeck, died in Dachau 5 May 1945, aged 45
KHODJA, Armand	Shield	Arrested 24 March 1944, Imprisoned at Bergen-Belsen until May 1945
KLATAMA, Alexandre	Bob-73B	
KOENING, Robert	Peter-16C/IAM Asymptote	
KOENINGSWERTHER, Philippe	Trout	Executed in Struthof Concentration Camp Sept 1944, aged 28
LABIT, Henri	Torture	Suicide 3 May 1942, aged 22
LABOUS, Yves	Peter-16B	Imprisoned at Buchenwald until May 1945
LACOEUILLE, Guy	Paul-9	
LAFFON, Émile	1 Tank 2 Shield	
LANCEL, Camille	Tricycle	
LANCESSEUR, Michel	Tabouret	Executed 18 July 1944, aged 24
LARAT, Bruno	Boomerang/Roach-71	Imprisoned at Buchenwald, died aged 28
LARDY, Roger	Sardine	
LAURENT, Etienne-Michel	Barter-1	Died of injuries 22 June 1942, aged 20
LAVERDET, Raymond	Dastard	
LAVIGNE, (X)	London-462	
LE BIHAN, Charles Jean François Marie	Peter-16F	
LE CORVAISIER, Yves	(Unknown-1)	
LE FUSTEC, Luc	1 Leg/Whiskers 2 Scalp/Tube-V	
LE GAC, Jean-François	Roach-4/Mussel/Minor/Winkle	Died in Hersbruck Concentration Camp Oct 1944, aged 30
LE TAC, Joël	Overcloud	Imprisoned at Bergen-Belsen until April 1945
LEBAIGUE, Jacques	1 Peter-79A/IAM Benjoin 2 (Unknown-6)	
LEBIGRE, Yves	Donald-7	
LEBOSQUAIN du PLESSIS, Alfred	SF4	
LECOMPTE-BOINET, Jacques	Bludgeon/Union-1	
LECOT, Georges	Roach-33/Ling	
LEFÈVRE, Jean-Robert	Tandem	
LEFRANC, Robert	1 Percy-29A(?) 2 Horde	KIA 8 Sept 1944, aged 23
LEGER, Lucien	Tricycle	
LÉGER, Yves	Bob-66/Leminscate	Executed by Gestapo 27 May 1944 aged 25
LEGRAND, Gaston	Harry-15	
LEISTENSCHNEIDER, Paul	1 Tank 2 Marc-1 3 John-67C	
LEJEUNE, Pierre	Trainer	
LEMAIRE, Jean Philippe	Earth/Peuplier	
LEMAITRE, André	Donald-19B/Verveine	
LENCEMENT, Robert	Trombone	Imprisoned at Buchenwald until May 1945
LENCLOS, Marcel	Minnow	Died January 1945, possibly Bolzano Italy, aged 37
LENFANT, Guy	Cockle Howitzer	
LEROUX, Jean	Aloes	
LEVASSEUR, Antoine	Donald-64A	
LEVY, Gérard	Failsworthy	
LÉVY, Jean-Pierre	Buckler/Figue	
LEYLAVERGNE, Edmond	Marc-1/Varlin	
LIUCCI, Jean	Tricycle	
LOISON, Émile	John-25A	
LONCHAMBON, Charles	Ventriloquist-39	
LONCLE, Jean	Minnow	Imprisoned Mauthausen, liberated May 1945
LOSTRIE, Maurice	Peter-16C/IAM Asymptote	
LUCAIRE, Andre	Pectoral	
LUSTAC, Georges	Percy-13G	
MALAFOSSE, Pierre Paul Marie	(Unknown-5)	
MALFETTES, Maxime	Marc-1/Varlin	
MALLARD, Roger	Machette	
MANGIN, Louis	Tank	
MANHÈS, Henri	Porpoise/Prawn/Gurnard	Imprisoned at Buchenwald until April 1945
MANUEL, Pierre-Emile	Bob-73	Imprisoned at Auschwitz July 1944
MARBOT, René	Percy-8B	
MARCHAL, Pierre	Battering Ram /Tortue	Suicide 23 Sept 1943, aged 41
MASSEY, William	Pectoral	
MASSON, Denis	Donald-64A	
MÉDÉRIC-VÉDY, Gilbert	1 Popgun 2 Sten 3 Septimus-I	Suicide 21 March 1944, aged 42
MEDIONI, Georges	Civette	KIA 18 Aug 1944, aged 40
MEISTERMANN, Joseph	Tabouret/Chicken	
MEYER, Daniel	Blunderbus	
MICHON, André	Donald-19B/Verveine	
MITCHELL, Roger	(Unknown-2)	
MOLINIE, Jean-Marie	Bob-73B	
MONNIER, Camille	John-38/IAM Union-1	Executed 22 May 1944, aged 27
MONJARET, Joseph	Robert/Perch/Mainmast-A	Imprisoned at Mauthausen until May 1945
MONTAUT, André	Goldfish	Died in Mauthausen June 1944, aged 22
MONTEFUSCO, Mario	Starter/Trainer-60/Trainer-67	
MORANDAT, Yvon	Outclass John-25/Action/Circonference	
MOREAU, Abel	Paul-104	
MORINEAUX, Yves	Mission-2/11	
MORRUZZI, Pierre	(Unknown-8)	
MOTTÉ-HOUBIGANT, Christian	Roach-3/Flounder	
MOULIN, Jean	Robert/Perch/Mainmast-A Sirene-II/Phalanx	Tortured and died 8 July 1943, aged 43
MOUREAUX, Pierre	Plaice	Imprisoned at Dachau until April 1945
MULLER, François	Paul-9C	
MUS, Gilbert Angelin Célestin	Perch3/Whale/Gudjeon	Imprisoned at Mauthausen until 29 April 1945
NAGEL, Raymond	Donald-64A	
NANCY, Jacques	Water Pistol	
NATUREL, Jacques	Percy-8B	
NATZLER, Pierre	Sculptor	
NAUTIN, Léon	Marc-1B/Advocat	Suicide 11 Feb 1944, aged 35
NOGUE, Pierre	Hagfish	Imprisoned at Sachsenhausen until May 1945
NOIREZ, Max	Bob-256	
OBADIA, René	John-25/Action/Circonference	
OLIVE, Roger	John-38A	KIA 17 July 1944, aged 25
OLIVIER, Paul	Marc-1	Suicide 3 May 1944, aged 28
ORABONA, Jean Thomas	Crayfish/Brill	Killed during drop, aged 21
PACAUD, Louis	Tabouret/Chicken	
PAIMBLANC, Jean Yves Alphonse	Ruff/Pike/Carp	
PAIN, Jacques	Shrimp	
PALAUD, Noel	Battering Ram /Tortue	
PALLE, Jacques Albert	Earth/Peuplier	
PARAYRE, Louis	London-462	
PARIS, Jean-François	John-38A	
PAYS, Edouard	Terrasse	
PELLAT, Gaston	IAM Eucalyptus	
PELLAY, Marcel	Boomerang/Roach-71	
PELOSSE, Léon	1 Bob-74/Germain/Rado/Soccer 2 Housing-1	
PERGAUD, Henri	Bob-73	
PERIOU, René	Mainmast	Imprisoned at Dachau until May 1945
PETITJEAN, Marguerite	John-25/Action/Circonference	
PICAUD, Yves	Roach-42/Bluefish/Dagger	Imprisoned at Dachau until May 1945
PICHARD, Cecile	Tommy-gun	
PICHARD, Michel	1 Aloes 2 Bob-224	
PIET, Joseph	Cod	Imprisoned at Dachau until June 1945
PIETRI, Jean	Donald-6C	
PINEAU, Christian	1 Bridge/Isabelle/Cahors/Phalanx 2 Sirene-II/Phalanx	Imprisoned at Buchenwald until April 1945
PITRE, Jean Edgard	1 (Unknown-6) 2 Peter-89A	
PLAULT, Maxime	Peter-38C	
POIMBOEUF, Marcel	Pencilfish	
POLAK, Charles-Joachim	Percy-47	
POMMIĖS, André	Horde	
PRÉ, Roland	Septimus-II	
RABEAU, Pierre	Marc-19	
RACINE, Marc	IAM Citronelle-2A	
RAPIN, André	Cockle Howitzer	
RAYON, Camille	Tank	
REDDÉ, Danielle	Peter-16B	
RÉMY, Jean	Donald-64	
REVEILLOUX, Marcel	John-22A/Gingembre	
REVEL, Maurice	Poignard	
REVERCHON, Roger	Earth/Peuplier	
RIVIÉRE, Paul	1 Boomerang/Roach-71 2 John-87A	
ROBERT, Jacques	Python Percy-19 / IAM Bergamotte	
RODRIGUES, Robert	Donald-64A	
ROMANS-PETIT, Henri	Welder-2	
RONDENAY, André	1 Halibut 2 Battering-Ram/Torture	Executed by Gestapo 15 August 1944 aged 31
ROSCHBACH, Maurice	Bob-224	
ROSENCHER, Henri	Gorge	Imprisoned at Dachau until May 1945
ROSENTHAL, Jacques	Mineur	
ROSENTHAL, Jean	1 Peashooter/Musc/Sap 2 Helm/Marksman/Xavier 3 John-87A	
ROSSELLI, Jean	Poignard	
ROUSSE, André	Harry-15	
ROUXIN, Xavier	1 Crayfish/Brill 2 Donald-22E	
SAILLARD, Philippe	IAM Eucalyptus	
SALLES, Antoine	Bludgeon/Union-1	
SALMON, James Leopold	John-67A	
SAUTEREAU, Roger	Tandem/Mission-2	
SAUVIER, Claude	Knuckle-duster	
SCAMARONI, Godefroy	Dab/Sea-Urchin	Suicide 20 March 1943, aged 29
SCHERRER-SAUVAGE, Paul Emile	Mission-2/11	
SCHLUMBERGER, Charles Bernard	Paul-9	
SCHMIDT, Paul Frédéric	Minnow	
SCHOCK, André	Sword	Imprisoned at Bergen-Belsen until April 1945
SCHRICKE, Etienne Jean	Earth/Peuplier	
SETRUK, Jacques	Halibut	
SHILTZ, (Aloyse Jean?)	Citronelle-2	
SIBILEAU, Jean	Percy-7F	KIA 28 Aug 1944, aged 25
SICHE, Marcel	Giles-2	
SIMON, Jean-Baptiste	Chub Minor/Starfish/Menhaven	
SIORAT, Gilbert	Tricycle	
SOULAS, Jacques	Easter	
SOMERS, Josiane	Percy-7F	
SONNEILLE, Pierre	Donald-6C	
SRIBER, Jean	Bob-141/De Retz	Deported and rescued by Allied 3 Sept 1944
STERN, Max	IAM Eucalyptus	
SUARÈS, Marcel	Patchouli	
TAINTURIER, Robert	Liberty/Juliette	
TARDY, Marcel	Paul-104	
TAVIAN, Gaston	Shrimp	
THACKTHWAITE, Henry	John-38/IAM Union-1	
TOLMÉ, Louis	Roach-4/Mussel/Minor/Winkle	Deported April 1943
TOUBAS, Albert	Bob-16/Ponton/Soldat/Trainer-24	KIA 15 May 1945 Phan Su Lin, Vietnam
TOURNISSA, Jean	Mission-2/11	KIA 28 Aug 1944, aged 32
TOURON, André	Paul-9	
TROLLET, Jean	1 Peter-79A/IAM Benjoin 2 (Unknown-6)	
TUPËT-THOMÉ, Edgard	Cod	
VAUCHERET, Jean-Paul	Pectoral	
VAUDIN, Georges	Paul-9	
VAUTRIN, Michel	Marc-19B	
VERGES, Paul	Marc-19B	
VERSAUD, Etienne	Mixer	
VIAT, Fernand G	IAM Eucalyptus	
VIENOT, Pierre	Pencilfish	
VIGUIER, Gaston	Peter-38G	
VIMONT-VICARY, Jean	Donald-22A	KIA 2 Sept 1944, aged 30
VIROLLE, Marcelle	Tommy-gun	
VIVIER, Guy	(Unknown-3)	
VOLNY RICHAUD, Jean	Marc-19B	
VOYER, Jacques	Pencilfish	Executed 27 June 1944, aged 22
WAGNER, Jean-Marie	Peter-38G	
WAHL, Pierre	Percy-8B	
WEILL, René-Georges	Goldfish	Suicide 29 May 1942, aged 34
WILLK, Anatole	1 Sunflower-7 2 IAM Shinoile	
YAFIL, Prosper	Poignard	
YEO-THOMAS, Forest	1 Seahorse 2 Bomb/Serin/Marie-Claire 3 Tommy-gun 4 Peter-16C/IAM Asymptote	Imprisoned at Buchenwald & Stalag XX-B, escaped April 1945
ZANINI, Dominique	John-22A/Gingembre	
