= Geoffrey Cardozo =

British Army Colonel

Geoffrey Cardozo CBE
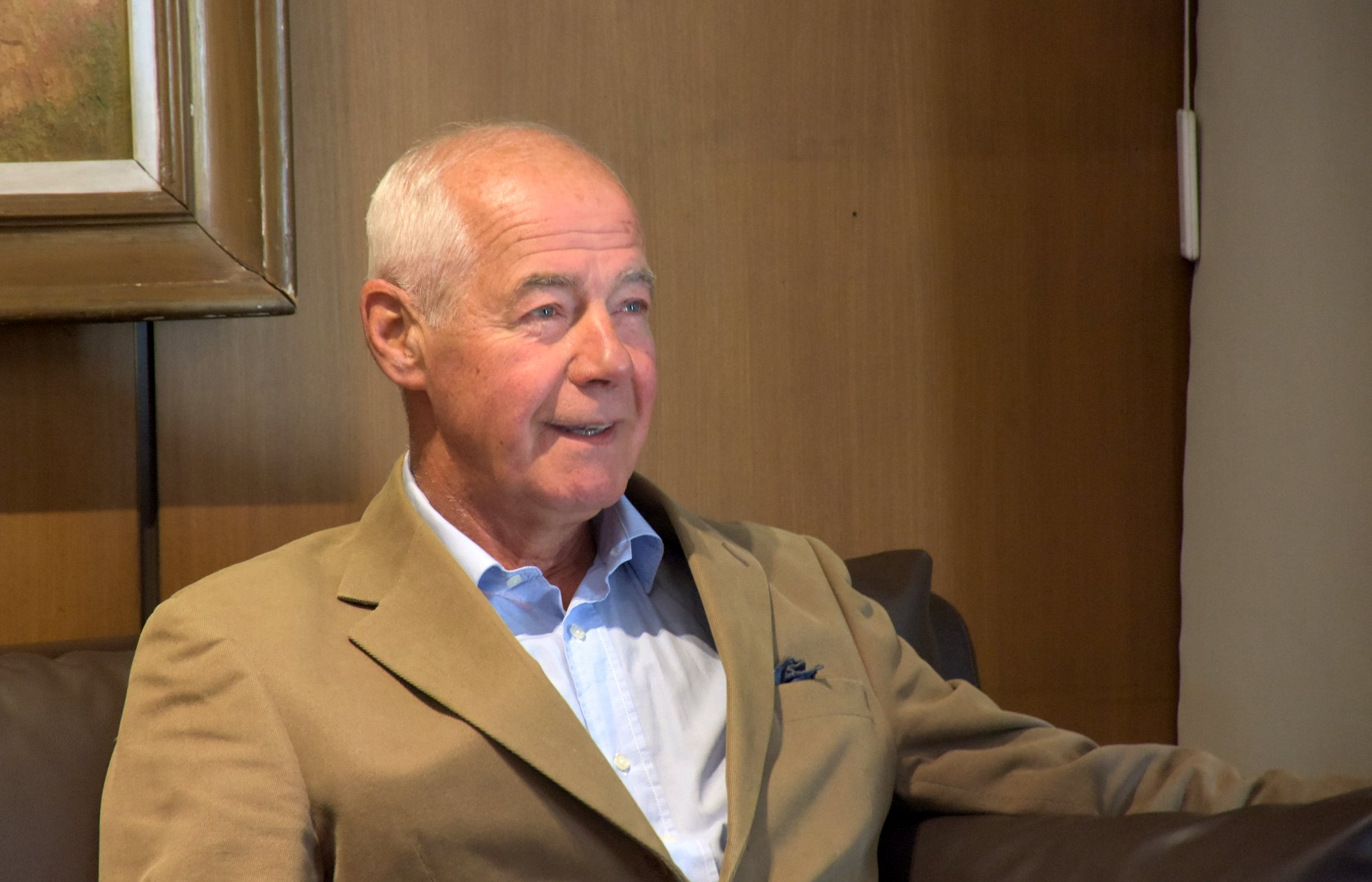
- Born: 3 March 1950 (age 76)
- Military career
- Branch: British Army
- Rank: Colonel
- Unit: 4th/7th Royal Dragoon Guards

Geoffrey Cardozo CBE (born 3 March 1950) is a former British Army Colonel, known for helping to identify the human remains of Argentine soldiers in the Argentine Military Cemetery in the Falkland Islands. A number of the Argentine dead had graves marked "Argentine soldier only known to God" after the Falklands War due to the refusal of the Argentine government to assist in their identification. In the Army, he belonged to the 4th/7th Royal Dragoon Guards.

In November 2020, he was nominated for the 2021 Nobel Peace Prize along with Julio Aro, the Argentine Falklands War veteran who joined efforts with Cardozo in the DNA identification of remains in the Cemetery.

He is the son of Frederick Cardozo, a British Soldier and SOE veteran. He also was Secretary of Veterans Aid.

== Work in the Darwin Cemetery ==
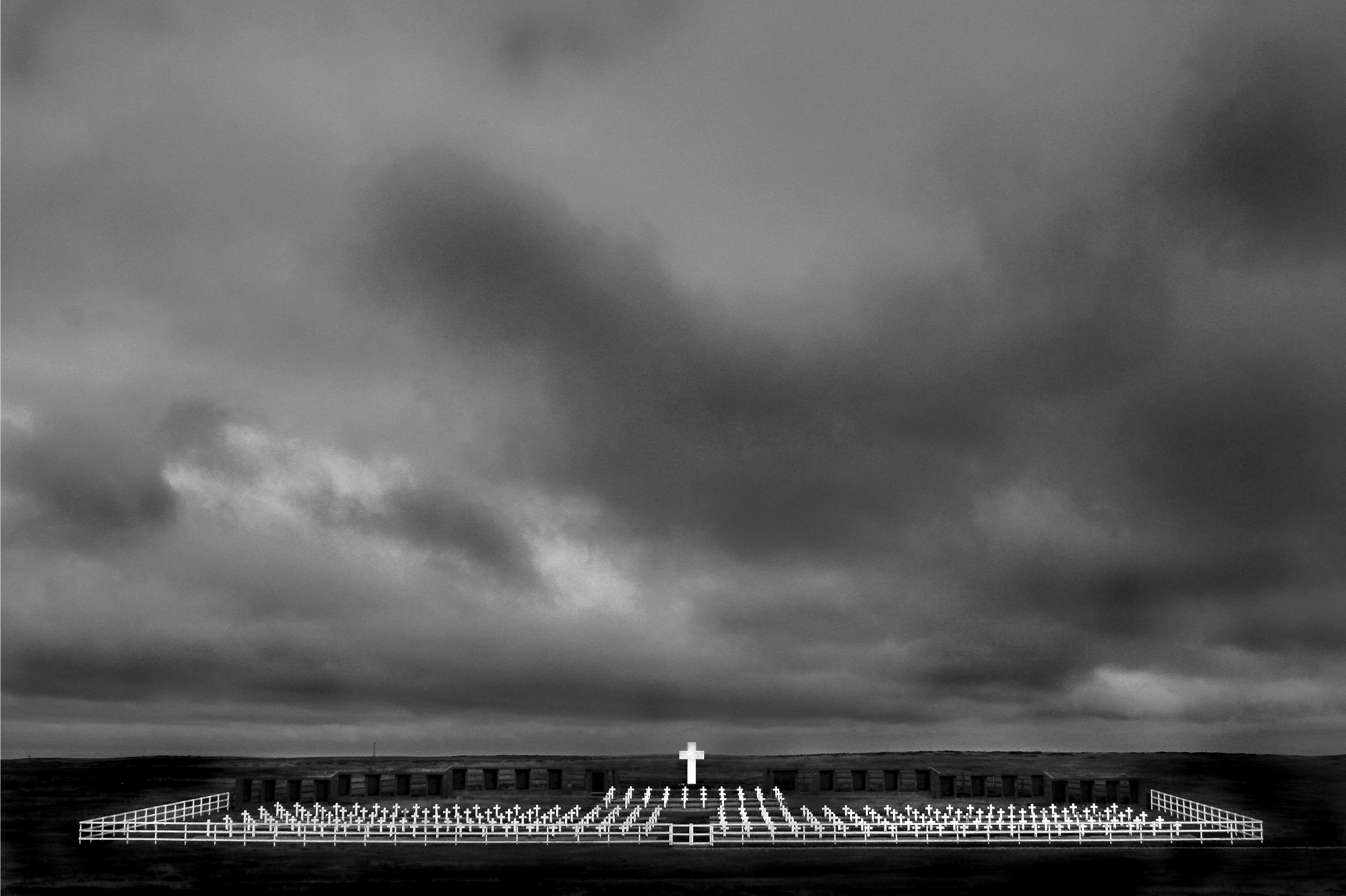
Darwin Cemetery in 2007

Cardozo, a specialist in post-traumatic stress disorder (PTSD) and Spanish speaker, arrived to the Falklands after the war to provide support and to check on the morale of service personnel. As military engineers cleared the island of landmines, bodies were usually found. Cardozo would then fly in a helicopter to look for the bodies, register the location where they were found and bury them.

Then, Cardozo was officially charged with the task of locating and burying the remains of Argentine soldiers dispersed in the island, and the creation of a cemetery (in land donated by Brooke Hardcastle, a farmer). To cope with this new task, he returned to London and assembled a crew of twelve men who would assist him in the Falklands, then came back to continue with the burying. The tasks started in January 1983.

Cardozo found according to different sources between 230 and 246 bodies: those he could positively identify, he provided a grave stone with personal details. For the 122 he could not identify, Cardozo took the decision to carefully bury them, including personal items he would find, in the idea that his work could someday help in identifying the Argentines. He wrapped the remains in three layers of sheets, plastic and PVC bags, including a note describing where the soldier had been found. They would be later placed in a wooden coffin. The burial works concluded on 19 February 1983, ten months after the end of the war. For the construction of the cemetery, he contacted the Commonwealth War Graves Commission.

Then, he wrote a report and sent it to the Red Cross, who sent it to the British Government, who would later send it to its Argentine counterparts. The families of Argentine veterans were not informed of the existence of this document.

== Identification of remains ==
In 2018, Argentine war veteran Julio Aro traveled to the Darwin Cemetery. He then went to London, seeking for British veterans that he could gather information from. There, he met Geoffrey Cardozo, who acted as a translator. He provided Aro with a copy of his reports, indicating the location of bodies in the cemetery, which became crucial for the DNA identification of Argentine veterans remains in 2017.

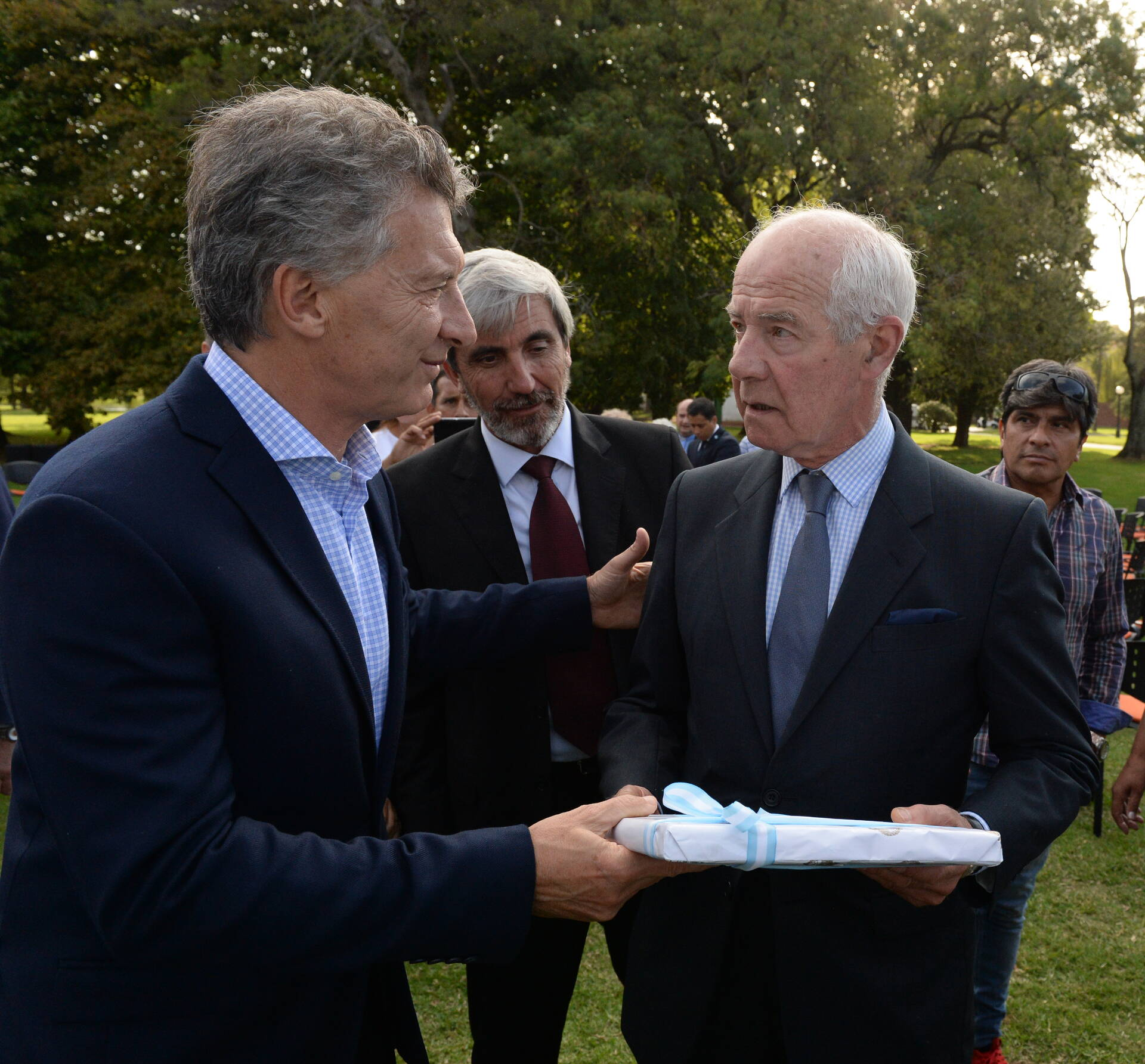
President Mauricio Macri with Geoffrey Cardozo and Julio Aro, in 2018

Then, a race to identify the remains started. Aro founded the No Me Olvides foundation (Don't Forget Me), accompanied with Cardozo and journalist Gabriela Cociffi. They also had the help of Roger Waters, who used his time in an audience with then-president Cristina Fernández de Kirchner to increase public pressure on the search. There was, however, no real progress under the Kirchner governments who did not discuss the matter with the British government. The breakthrough occurred with the government of Mauricio Macri and the signining of the Foradori/Duncan agreement.

== Honors ==
In 1984, Cardozo was appointed Member of the Most Excellent Order of the British Empire by Queen Elizabeth II.

In 2009, he was awarded a Mention of Honor by the Senate of Argentina. In 2018, he was distinguished by the Argentine Embassy in London, alongside Julio Aro, Gabriela Cociffi and Roger Waters.

In 2019, he was appointed Commander of the Most Excellent Order of the British Empire by Queen Elizabeth II for services to UK/Argentina relations.

== See also ==
- Falklands War
