= Frederick Cardozo =

English espionage agent

Frederick H. Cardozo
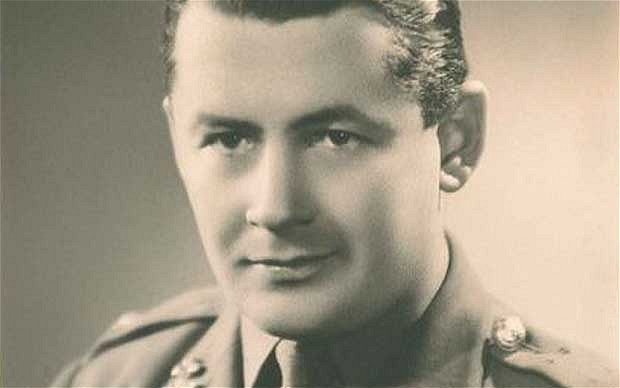
- Born: 1 December 1916; Newhaven, East Sussex
- Died: 7 October 2011 (aged 94)
- Military career
- Service years: 1939–1958
- Rank: Lt. Col
- Units: South Lancashire Regiment, 6th Airborne Division
- Awards: Military Cross, Legion of Honour, Croix de Guerre

Lt. Col Frederick Henry Cardozo MC (1 December 1916 – 7 October 2011) was a British soldier and SOE veteran. Cardozo was brought up in the Loire Valley between 1923 and 1933.

In 1949 Cardozo married Simone Bigot – they had two children – one of whom, Col. Geoffrey Cardozo CBE, is the secretary of the veterans charity, Veterans Aid. At the time of his birth, his father Charles was the commander of a local army garrison, having been wounded in 1915, at the battle of Loos.

In recognition of his work for the French resistance, Cardozo was awarded both the Legion of Honour and the Croix de Guerre.

== Family background ==
Cardozo's Portuguese ancestors had become established in the London tobacco trade in the late 17th century. A century or so later his forebears, (including his father), were merchants for the East India Company in Madras. Cardozo's mother, Cynthia, was the daughter of Henry Daniell, who ran a china and antiques business in Wigmore Street, London; through his trade interests he had helped to organise the Wallace Collection and the Pierpont Morgan Collection.

== Second World War ==
Cardozo joined the British Army's Supplementary Reserve before the outbreak of war and upon receiving his call up was posted with his regiment, The South Lancashire Regiment to France. He was evacuated from Dunkirk and on his return to Britain was posted to coastline duties, in anticipation of the expected German invasion.

Whilst on exercises in Scotland, Cardozo was approached by Henry Thackthwaite, a senior SOE officer, who recruited him for operations in France; as a fluent French speaker he was a natural choice for such a posting. In May 1944 his team was parachuted onto Mont Mouchet in France to liaise with the maquis in the Auvergne. Relations with the maquis were not always easy and they had to cope with a series of vicious German counterattacks on Mont Mouchet and the surrounds.

Once Paris had fallen to the allies, Cardozo led a maquis operation to stop a German battalion leaving Aurillac; his efforts in this operation lead him to be awarded the Military Cross.

== After Second World War ==
Cardozo stayed in the army after the war, retiring in 1958, when he worked as a press attaché for American forces in France.

Before this he had served in India and later in Palestine with the 6th Airborne Division, and later in Paris where he was an instructor at École de guerre. He subsequently served as a college commander at Sandhurst.

When France left the command structure of NATO in 1966, he returned to England and became secretary to the president of the Latin Mass Society, Harman Grisewood, his first cousin. He later moved to Morocco and began working for the Save the Children Fund. Later still, he worked for De Beers in Sierra Leone. When he finally retired, he moved back to his childhood home of the Loire Valley.
