= Henry Thackthwaite =

British Army officer

Henry H.A. Thackthwaite
- Born: 1 April 1904; London
- Died: 8 November 1982 (aged 78); London
- Military career
- Service years: 1939 – 1946
- Rank: Major
- Unit: Royal Army Service Corps
- Awards: OBE, Legion of Honour, Croix de Guerre

Major Henry Hopkinson Augustus Thackthwaite OBE (1 April 1904 – 8 November 1982) was a British soldier and veteran of the Special Operations Executive.

Thackthwaite was born in West London in 1904. His mother and paternal grandmother were French and Thackthwaite was bilingual from an early age. He read physiology at Oxford and worked as a teacher/translator in Beaminster, Dorset before WWII.

Thackthwaite joined the Royal Army Service Corps in March 1940. In 1942, he began working for Special Operations Executive RF section. In January 1944, he parachuted into a drop-zone near the village of Eymeux where he helped organise French Resistance groups, in an operation known as UNION-I. Thackthwaite was exfiltrated in May 1944 to take up an important administrative position of the SOE (RF) section. The General Staff of the French Forces of the Interior (EMFFI) was set up just ahead of the D-day landings in June 1944, and SOE (RF) became the 6th bureau of the EMFFI charged with special missions. In late 1944, EMFFI mounted a dual operation, JUDEX, from an office in the Hotel Cecil in Paris. The two operations were commanded by Col. M. Buckmaster for 3rd bureau and Thackthwaite for 6th bureau. Thackthwaite was demobbed in October 1946 and returned to Beaminster, Dorset. He taught Latin and French until moving to France about 1962. There, he taught French to young English children. In 1982, with his health failing, Thackthwaite returned to the UK to live at the Royal Star and Garter retirement home in west London. He died on 8 November 1982. He was 78.

For his work in the war, Thackthwaite was made a member of the Order of British Empire in 1945. He was also awarded the Medal of Freedom with Bronze Palm 1947 as well as the French Croix de Guerre and Legion d'Honneur.

== Early life and education ==
Thackthwaite was born in 1904, the son of Henry Hopkinson Thackthwaite and Fernande Madeline LeMarie, in the Hanworth area of west London. Both his mother and paternal grandmother were French and he was bilingual from an early age. From 1917 to 1923, Thackthwaite attended St Paul's School in Hammersmith before going up to read physiology at Corpus Christi, Oxford, he graduated in 1927 and was awarded his BA in 1928 and an honorary MA in 1965.

Prior to the start of WWII, Thackthwaite worked in the Beaminster area of Dorset as a teacher/translator. In September 1939, he and his wife were living at his parents house, together with his French mother- and sister-in-law.

== Second World War ==
Thackthwaite joined the Royal Army Service Corps on 30 March 1940 and promoted to Second Lieutenant in May 1940.

The Special Operations Executive's RF Section came into being in the spring of 1941. RF Section was located at 1 Dorset Square. From January 1942 onwards, Thackthwaite was making contributions to Special Operations Executive RF section's 'History' in 1 Dorset Square, London. He is also credited with recruiting Frederick Cardozo into the SOE while on training exercises in Scotland in 1943.

=== Operation UNION-I ===
On 6 January 1944, Capt.Thackthwaite [alias Procureur], along with US Capt. Peter Julien Otiz [alias Chambellan] (OSS) and Camille Monier (BCRA) [alias Magyar alias Léon] were parachuted from a Handley Page Halifax belonging to RAF 138 Squadron and piloted by F/Lieut Pick onto DZ (Drop-zone) Agonie. DZ Agonie was near the village of Eymeux, 10 km to the north-east of Romans-sur-Isère.

Colonel Pierre Fourcaud [alias Sphère] had been scheduled to accompany the team but had broken a leg during training, he joined the group on 8 February 1944, landing at LZ (Landing-zone) Orion.

The objective of this operation was to assess and co-ordinate the organisation of the local maquis forces in the Vercors covering the three départments of Isère, Drôme and Savoie. After landing, Thackthwaite and Ortiz changed from civilian jump clothes to military uniforms and according to Thackthwaite became "the first allied liaison officers to appear in uniform in France since 1940".

The Vercors plateau extends over almost 1,000 km^{2} (390 sq mi) and is over 1,000 m (3,300 ft) above sea level. In addition to the resident population, Thackthwaite found about 3000 maquisards, 500 of which were lightly armed and "[who] could be organised into a HQ company supplied with Vickers, mortars and Piats".

UNION-I led to the much larger UNION-II operation led by Ortiz from 1 August 1944.

Thackthwaite was exfiltrated on 3 May 1944 from the LZ Aigle to the north west of Manziat near Maçon; there is a memorial on the side of the road commemorating the use of the landing zone. The pick-up was performed by RAF Squadron 161 using a Lockheed Hudson aircraft piloted by F/L Affleck, amongst others collected was Paul Riviere [alias Marquis].

It was this mission that led to Thackthwaite's OBE, awarded in March 1945, his citation reads (in part) thus: "Major Thackthwaite was responsible with his colleagues for establishing contact with those elements of the resistance necessary to facilitate the re-organisation of the Maquis groups in his region. By his tact, administrative ability and knowledge of the Resistance Movements in FRANCE, he was largely instrumental in securing the acceptance of the mission by the heads of those movements, and in organising the necessary parachute operations to equip a considerable proportion of the Maquis groups", the citation continues "...(he) was ordered to return to this country (...) to take up an important administrative position of the SOE (RF)".

This coincided with the capture of Yeo-Thomas on 21 March 1944 by the Gestapo while conducting operation Asymptote. The withdrawal of Thackthwaite is highly significant; having two senior RF Section members in the field, one captured, presented a huge security risk. Yeo-Thomas would spend the remainder of the war as a POW masquerading mostly as F/L Kenneth Dodkin (RAF). He arrived in Paris on VE day, 8 May 1945 and was able rejoin Thackthwaite and José Dupuis at the British Officer's Club in the rue du Faubourg St Honoré for dinner.

=== EMFFI ===
The État-major des Forces Française de l'Interieur (EMFFI) was set up just ahead of the D-day landings in June 1944, its role was to merge the various resistance forces operating in France. By July, the two sections of SOE - F and RF were brought under the overseeing control of EMFFI with the majority of F Section becoming the 2^{e} (intelligence) and 3^{e} (operations) bureaux. The RF section became 6^{e} bureau charged with 'special missions'. Thackthwaite, along with others from RF 'moved' into 6^{e} Bureau of EMFFI

=== Operation JUDEX ===
In late 1944, EMFFI mounted a dual operation 'JUDEX' from an office in the Hotel Cecil in Paris. The two operations were commanded by Col. M. Buckmaster for 3^{e} bureau and Thackthwaite for 6^{e} bureau. The objective of the operation was to visit the numerous maquis groups. Beyond that, it became a hot political potato with issues of pensions, compensation payments for widows, awards and medals for fighters, the re-establishment of normal post war life in France etc. The reports of RF Section have not survived.

=== Awards ===
In addition to the OBE awarded in 1945, Thackthwaite was awarded the Medal of Freedom with Bronze palm by the US in 1947 as well as the Croix de Guerre and Legion d'Honneur by France in recognition of work done for the French Resistance.

== After the War ==
Thackthwaite was demobbed 25 October 1946 and returned to his parents' home in Beaminster, Dorset. From the early 1950s, he taught Latin and French privately as well as at the local Beaminster and Netherbury Grammar School. In 1962/3 he moved to the Cardozo family home in St Cyr near Tours, France.

From the early 1970s, Thackthwaite lived in the small village of Bourg du Bost between Ribérac and Aubeterre in the north-west of the Dordogne department. While there he taught French to young English children whose parents had bought property in the area. By 1982, his health was failing and he returned to the UK, taking up residence at the Royal Star and Garter Retirement home in west London on 29 June.

== Personal life and death ==
Thackthwaite married Jeanne Charlotte-Marie Piette (1907–1989) sometime before 1939, possibly abroad. The couple had no children.

Thackthwaite died at the Royal Star and Garter retirement home in west London on 8 November 1982.
