= Veterans Aid =

UK-based charity

- Formation: 1932
- Type: Charity
- Location: 27 Victoria Square, London SW1W 0RB
- Staff: 25
- Website: veterans-aid.net

Veterans Aid is a UK-based charity that provides aid to former members of the Royal Navy, Marines, Army, Air Force, and Merchant Navy, as well as their widows and widowers. It operates from two locations in London—a drop-in centre and head office in Victoria, and the residential New Belvedere House in Stepney.

The charity operates an "open door policy", with a stated aim to make its services accessible to all veterans seeking assistance.

== History ==
Gwendoline Huggins, whose husband served as adjutant of the Royal Hospital Chelsea from 1932 to 1935, founded the organization. After seeing homeless veterans in the city and near the Thames Embankment, she opened H10 in January 1932 at Lambeth, South London.

Veterans Aid, originally named H10 and later The Embankment Fellowship Centre (EFC), was established in 1932 to reduce homelessness among military veterans in London who were experiencing poverty and unemployment at the time. The charity started as a canteen and recreation room for destitute ex-servicemen.

In 2007, the charity was renamed Veterans Aid to reflect its remit more accurately.

The charity's patron is the Dowager Viscountess Rothermere.

== Main activities ==
The organization provides a range of services, including emergency housing, food and clothing distribution, and referrals to specialized support agencies.

Subsequent services may include counseling, addiction treatment, rehabilitation, debt management, and, where appropriate, access to education and retraining. Veterans Aid has initiatives to identify employment opportunities and to find homes for veterans.

Veterans Aid participates in the Mayor of London's "Life off the Streets" program, led by London mayor Sadiq Khan. The program assisted 5,455 people between March and December 2019.

== See also ==
- Post traumatic stress disorder
- Military Covenant
- Homelessness
