= Program of the National Council of the Resistance =

French Resistance program adopted in 1944 outlining post-liberation reforms

The programme of the National Council of the Resistance (French: programme du Conseil national de la Résistance), commonly abbreviated as CNR programme and originally titled Les Jours heureux par le CNR (Note: As evidenced by a copy preserved by the National Resistance Museum in Champigny-sur-Marne.), is a French text unanimously adopted by the National Council of the Resistance on March 9 1944.

This document, spanning fewer than ten pages, consists of two parts: an "immediate action plan," addressing the actions of the French Resistance in preparation for the Liberation of France, and "measures to be implemented upon the liberation of the territory," a government programme encompassing measures for post-war purges and long-term reforms, such as the restoration of universal suffrage, nationalizations, and the establishment of social security.

The second part has garnered more historical attention, as most of its programmatic proposals shaped debates and general policy between the 1944 Liberation and early 1946. Unlike other government programmes, a distinctive feature of the CNR programme is its adoption by the full spectrum of political groups represented within the French Resistance.

== Summary of the programme ==
=== Immediate action plan ===
The first part, the "immediate action plan," begins with observations and emphasizes the necessity of armed struggle and recognition of Charles de Gaulle and the authority of the French Committee of National Liberation (CFLN):

through the intensification of the struggle led by the armed forces and the organizations formed by the masses, the true union of all patriotic forces can be achieved for the realization of national liberation, inseparable, as General de Gaulle stated, from the national insurrection, which... will be directed by the CNR under the authority of the CFLN.

A significant portion of the text is dedicated to the creation of Departmental Committee of Liberation (CDLs). The roles of these committees are distinguished from those of the French Forces of the Interior (FFI), whose responsibilities are also defined.

=== Measures to be implemented upon liberation ===
In the second part, "measures to be implemented upon the liberation of the territory," the programme first addresses "ensuring the punishment of traitors and the removal, in the realms of administration and professional life, of those who collaborated with the enemy or actively participated in the policies of collaborationist governments" and the confiscation of property belonging to traitors and black market profiteers.

=== Other measures ===
Additional measures include:

- Political reforms, such as the restoration of democracy, universal suffrage, and freedom of the press;
- Economic measures, inspired by planism, characterized by "the establishment of a true economic and social democracy, requiring the eviction of large economic and financial feudalisms from the direction of the economy", commonly referred to as nationalizations, and expressed in the text as "the return to the nation of major monopolized means of production, the fruit of collective labor, energy sources, subsoil wealth, insurance companies, and major banks";
- Social measures, including significant wage adjustments, the restoration of independent trade unionism and shop stewards, and "a comprehensive social security plan, aimed at ensuring all citizens a means of subsistence in cases where they are unable to secure it through work, with management entrusted to representatives of the stakeholders and the State".

== History of the programme's development ==
The first part of the CNR programme has few precedents in French history, as it concerns the organization of an armed insurrection under foreign domination, a situation unprecedented in modern France. The second part, "reforms to be implemented upon liberation," aligns with the tradition of joint government programmes. The first such programme was the "Réunion de la Montagne" published in April 1849. Its preamble highlighted the role of programmes in democratic processes. Generally, right-wing factions, described as "empirical and conservative," were less inclined to develop programmes. Charles de Gaulle himself expressed doubts about the utility of political programmes when elected president of the Provisional Government of the French Republic. While the left-wing tradition was more open to government programmes, the only historical precedents before 1940 were those of 1849 and 1936.

=== 1935–1936: Programme of the National Conference of the Popular Front ===
From 1934, convergence within the left, initially in an anti-fascist perspective and later within the National Conference of the Popular Front, which united left-wing forces supporting the Popular Front, the establishment of a joint programme was not straightforward. The inclusion of nationalizations, often termed "socializations," was a demand of the socialists from the French Section of the Workers' International (SFIO), met with reluctance by French communists, as articulated by Maurice Thorez in a January 1935 article in L'Humanité: "The smallest action is worth more than twelve programmes (...) what Marx meant to convey, what Lenin and the Bolsheviks understood (...) is that what matters most is to act." During the adoption of a joint programme by the National Conference of the Popular Front, established on June 17, 1935, to prepare for victory in the 1936 legislative elections, the communists, supported by the radicals, favored a minimalist approach to nationalizations. The resulting compromise provided only for "the nationalization of war industries," and the term "nationalization" was avoided for the Bank of France, despite its impending nationalization. Léon Blum persisted until 1942, while imprisoned in Puy-de-Dôme, in advocating for a government programme, as evidenced by letters to his socialist friends and de Gaulle.

=== January 1943: Programme of the Socialist Action Committee ===
Events at the onset of World War II, such as the Molotov–Ribbentrop Pact, the dissolution of the Communist Party, and the Phoney War, created a divide between socialists and communists, which only resolved by late 1942 through direct contacts between the Socialist Action Committee (CAS) and the Communist Party, both operating clandestinely. The communists prioritized national unity and alliance with Gaullist resistance over forming a clandestine Popular Front. Consequently, the CAS independently published Our Programme in January 1943, the first post-war political programme from a clandestine party, outlining five sets of measures, including women's suffrage, the "total elimination of trusts from national life," the "progressive elimination of competition and profit," the "nationalization of credit and banks, insurance companies, key industries, and foreign trade," and the maintenance and improvement of pre-1939 labor laws. Months later, the socialists, fully aligned with de Gaulle, proposed a "Common Programme" to the French Resistance at the National Council of the Resistance, formed on May 27, 1943, which dropped the abolition of competition but introduced worker and technician participation in management. This programme was likely not discussed by CNR members, as it was overshadowed by a programme from the French Committee of National Liberation (CFLN), presented by Émile Laffon on July 15, 1943.

=== July 1943: Laffon Project of the CFLN ===
The Laffon project closely resembled the socialist programme, possibly due to contributions from London-based socialists like André Philip or Georges Boris. It is unclear whether all CFLN members were aware of the project. The Laffon project included an Economic and Social Charter advocating dirigisme, defined as "the orientation and control of production by the State for the benefit of the community," requiring "the prior elimination of economic feudalisms." The term "socialization" was used instead of "nationalization" for major credit-distributing banks. The charter limited worker participation in company management to technical aspects but provided for profit-sharing, either individually or for social initiatives. Internationally, the Laffon project proposed "surrenders of national sovereignty" to a "superior Community of States" or "Universal League," an idea also present in the socialist programme.

André Mercier, the communist representative at the CNR, opposed the Universal League concept and the economic aspects of the Laffon project, criticizing its "lack of Marxism," according to historian Claire Andrieu. Right-wing CNR representatives, such as Joseph Laniel of the Democratic Alliance and Louis Marin of the URD, opposed the Laffon project for opposite reasons. Laniel favored a return to complete liberalism within a national framework, while Marin reportedly called it a "Nazi, fascist, and Vichyst project." The project received favorable responses from other CNR organizations, but the National Front tipped the balance toward rejection, advocating a unanimous stance to avoid alienating any French Resistance members. Communist Pierre Villon, representing the National Front at the CNR, played a key role in the adoption of the final text in March 1944.

=== September 1943: CGT Programme ===
The representatives of the trade unions, CGT and CFTC, supported the Laffon project. After the 1939 split, the confederal and communist (unitary, recalling the CGTU) factions had reconciled and reunified following the Perreux Agreements. The Post-War Action Programme proposed by Louis Saillant on behalf of the CGT to the CNR in September 1943 included sections agreed upon by both factions, such as restoring republican legality, but also sections with separate motions. For instance, the closed shop principle, granting unions a monopoly on hiring, was proposed only by the communist unitaries, while the ex-confederals favored state primacy in employment offices and dismissal authorizations, with unions in a supervisory role. Another disagreement concerned the future of the Industrial organization committees, public professional syndicates established by Vichy, reflecting the corporatism and dirigisme of the National Revolution. The confederals proposed reforming these committees by expelling "trusts" and strengthening state and union roles, while the unitaries demanded their complete abolition, arguing they reinforced "trusts."

=== November 1943: the National Studies Committee report ===
While the CGT document necessarily contains contradictions due to the divergent expressions of the two tendencies, another document also published in the fall of 1943 contains enough contradictions to render it completely unusable. This is the Report on Post-War Economic Policy prepared by the National Studies Committee, created under the name Committee of Experts in June 1942, at the initiative of Jean Moulin and François de Menthon. The voluminous 1943 report, often called the Courtin Report, was the work of nine members of the Committee, including René Courtin, Pierre-Henri Teitgen, and Emmanuel Monick. According to Claire Andrieu, the Courtin report is torn between its liberal convictions and its desire to satisfy "public opinion," which was unanimously judged to favor nationalizations. In the PCF's "Remarks," which tear the report apart, it appears that the PCF was interested in nationalizations, presenting them as a means to "free France from the anti-national and anti-social domination of the men of the trusts." This apparent acceptance of nationalizations without the prior abolition of the capitalist regime was a novelty for the PCF, which definitively rallied to this idea at the beginning of 1945.

=== December 1943–January 1944: discussion of the National Front project ===
From November 1943 to August 1944, there were no plenary meetings of the CNR. The CNR bureau thus played an essential role in developing the text adopted on March 15, 1944. The five members of the CNR bureau were Georges Bidault, president, representing the Radical Party and the Democratic Alliance; Louis Saillant, who represented the CGT but also the Socialists, Libération-Nord, and the CFTC; Pascal Copeau, a member of Libération-Sud, who also represented the Mouvements unis de la Résistance (MUR); Maxime Blocq-Mascart, a member of the Civil and Military Organization (OCM), who also represented Ceux de la Résistance and Ceux de la Libération; and finally, Pierre Villon, secretary of the National Front for the Struggle for the Liberation and Independence of France, who also represented the PCF and the Republican Federation. Ultimately, with one man from the right (Blocq-Mascart), two socialists (Saillant and Copeau), and one communist (Villon), according to Claire Andrieu, the bureau was representative of the entire CNR. Within the bureau, Villon played a driving role, which he recalled in his memoirs:

In the summer of 1943, Émile Laffon... proposed to the CNR a charter, a sort of manifesto for the post-war period. We could not confine ourselves to a negative attitude; I opted for drafting a counter-project... but before submitting the counter-project, I had a meeting—the only one I had during this entire period—with Jacques Duclos and Benoît Frachon.

It was at the Beaudreville farm in Gometz-la-Ville, in the Hurepoix, that Villon met with André Mercier the two clandestine PCF leaders, Jacques Duclos and Benoît Frachon. This was the only time the two leaders had direct contact with a party official not a member of the secretariat within their clandestine apparatus.

Following this meeting with Duclos and Frachon, Villon drafted a Project for a Resistance Charter Proposed by the F.N., the essence of which consisted of a call for immediate action against the occupier and which ended with a succinct set of measures, both liberal and social, desired for the period following the Liberation. Claire Andrieu notes that these reforms were "no more revolutionary than the Popular Front programme." The CNR bureau met once or twice a week between December 1943 and January 1944. In addition to the five members, Jacques Bingen, the CFLN delegate, attended the sessions. Most of the meeting time was devoted to examining the F.N. project and designating provisional administrators, future provisional Secretaries General of the ministries. In January 1944, the CNR bureau unanimously adopted a Charter of the Resistance, close to the F.N. project, where the post-liberation reforms were modified in a slightly more "socializing" direction.

=== March 15, 1944: adoption of the Resistance Action Programme ===
This Charter of the Resistance was sent to all CNR members for review. A number of criticisms were expressed, and the CNR bureau entrusted the revision of the text to the steering committee of the M.U.R., whose three members were Pascal Copeau, Claude Bourdet, and Antoine Avinin. The three M.U.R. members appealed to representatives of three other resistance movements, France au Combat, Défense de la France, and Résistance, thus forming the steering committee of a new structure, the National Liberation Movement. This committee of six sent a revised project, adopted by the CNR bureau on February 28, 1944, under the name Resistance Action Programme.

It remained to have this text approved by all CNR members. While the right-wing parties were convinced fairly quickly, the socialists took much longer to decide. Since December 1943, the most heated debates had not been about the measures to implement after the Liberation, but about the immediate action programme. The socialists suspected the communists of wanting to develop immediate action to position themselves to seize political power. The communists were not the only ones promoting the development of immediate action; they were joined by right-wing men such as Pierre de Bénouville, Jacques Renouvin, and Henri Frenay. When the socialists proposed a "committee of understanding" to the communists, the latter refused in the name of resistance unity and rejected any reference to class struggle "so as not to provide a reason for division among the French." The turning point came with a long article titled The Fear of the People and the Betrayal of the Fatherland published in l'Humanité on March 15, 1944, where the author, Jacques Duclos, relaunched the theme of resistance as the struggle of the people and its party, the communist party.

After a final modification of the text in the first half of March by Copeau, Bourdet, and Daniel Mayer, the call for immediate action was very slightly toned down, and the social reform aspect was emphasized. The final text was adopted by the CNR bureau on March 15, 1944. Contrary to the assertion in the text's introduction, there was no plenary assembly, but a careful examination of the different versions of the text reveals that the Resistance Action Programme benefited from the participation of all tendencies represented within the CNR.

== Implementation of the CNR programme ==
It is difficult to determine whether all measures outlined in the "immediate action plan" were implemented, as the adoption of the programme in March 1944 did not end discussions on the unity of the Resistance. While the Departmental Committee of Liberation (CDLs) outlined in the programme were legally established by the French Committee of National Liberation (CFLN) in Algiers through the ordinance of April 21, 1944, the Milices Patriotiques, assigned to the CDLs and established by the communists starting in June 1944, quickly became a source of contention among organizations claiming allegiance to the programme. The Liberation of Paris in August 1944 largely rendered the "immediate action plan" obsolete. From then on, the second part, commonly referred to as the "CNR programme," became the guide for reforms implemented by the Provisional Government of the French Republic, and from October 21, 1945, by governments supported by elected legislative assemblies.

=== Limited dissemination from March to August 1944 ===
Until the liberation of most of France in August 1944, the CNR programme had relatively little impact. After its adoption in Paris in March 1944, the programme quickly became known in Algiers, but despite a unanimous vote by the delegates of the Provisional Consultative Assembly in Algiers requesting the provisional government to "establish the conditions for the return to the nation of the major means of production claimed by the National Council of the Resistance," the CNR programme did not receive official approval from the CFLN. At the time of the Liberation of Paris, on the proposal of Daniel Mayer, the CNR had planned to solemnly present the programme to General de Gaulle and invite him to proclaim the Republic, but no one delivered the programme to de Gaulle, who did not proclaim the Republic, as he maintained that it had never ceased to exist.

On July 27, 1944, one of the measures in the CNR programme was implemented before the Liberation of Paris: the GPRF in Algiers restored trade union freedom and abolished the Labour Charter of October 4, 1941.

Overall, the dissemination of the Resistance programme was limited and uneven. A small number of clandestine publications gave significant coverage to the Resistance Programme. Only Libération published it in full, while Combat and Franc-Tireur published it only partially. Many publications, such as L'Humanité, Témoignage Chrétien, and Défense de la France, did not even mention it during the clandestine period.

=== Ordinances of the Provisional Government (August 1944–October 1945) ===
From September 1944, implementing its programme became the primary purpose of the CNR, which continued until 1947. Louis Saillant succeeded Georges Bidault, who was appointed Minister of Foreign Affairs. On October 7, 1944, the CNR organized a large gathering at the Vélodrome d'Hiver and had the main points of its programme acclaimed by a vast crowd.

At the time of the Liberation, the socialists of the SFIO, along with the reunified CGT trade unionists, were the most committed supporters of the CNR programme. The socialists viewed nationalizations not only as socialist measures but also as patriotic ones. The PCF seemed to waver between promoting its own programme and that of the CNR, but it more clearly endorsed the CNR programme after Maurice Thorez's return to France and the acceptance of the dissolution of the Milices patriotiques in November 1944. In January 1945, Thorez advocated for "the return to the nation of the major monopolized means of production," i.e., nationalizations, but this demand was less pressing than that of purges. The third major tendency within the Resistance, the Christian democrats, founded a party, the Popular Republican Movement (MRP), in November 1944. Until the spring of 1945, they were driven by a "revolutionary faith," in the words of Claire Andrieu, who notes that, alongside the socialist daily Le Populaire, the Christian democratic-inspired newspaper L'Aube repeatedly called for "Revolution," while communist newspapers did not mention it at the time. The MRP, according to its objectives announced on September 5, sought to "end the capitalist regime and the dictatorship of money" but expressed reservations about nationalizations, invoking the "liberalization of the economy." In December 1944, Emmanuel d'Astier de La Vigerie tabled a motion at the Provisional Consultative Assembly urgently calling for the nationalization of major companies, a motion that received unanimous support from the delegates who voted. In July 1945, Jacques Duclos secured the adoption of a motion urgently demanding nationalizations and economic purges. Only Joseph Denais, a member of the Republican Federation, attempted to oppose it by submitting a proposal to keep the state in a role of control and coordination, excluding any nationalization or socialization.

The Provisional Government of the French Republic itself never officially recognized the CNR programme. De Gaulle avoided referencing the CNR when, on September 12, 1944, at the Palais de Chaillot, he announced the "principles" guiding his actions:

[...] while ensuring maximum freedom for all and promoting the spirit of enterprise in all matters, [France] aims to ensure that private interests are always subordinate to the general interest, that the major sources of common wealth are exploited and managed [...] for the benefit of all, that coalitions of interests [...] are abolished once and for all, and that each of its sons and daughters can live, work, and raise their children in security and dignity.

Between December 1944 and October 1945, the Provisional Government issued a series of ordinances in line with the measures advocated by the CNR programme:

- August 26 and September 30, 1944: organization of the press, prohibition of concentrations.
- December 13, 1944: establishment of the Northern and Pas-de-Calais Coal Mines;
- December 18, 1944: state control over the merchant navy;
- December 30, 1944: increase in social security contributions.
- January 16, 1945: nationalization of Renault factories with the confiscation of Louis Renault's assets;
- February 22, 1945: establishment of works councils;
- May 29, 1945: transfer to the state of shares in Gnome et Rhône;
- June 26, 1945: transfer to the state of shares in Air France and Air Bleu;
- October 4, 1945: foundational ordinance of Social security in France;
- October 17, 1945: statute on sharecropping and tenant farming.

== Economic and social reforms in 1946 ==
The 1945 French legislative election resulted in a victory for the three parties that prioritized the implementation of the CNR programme, securing 75% of the votes: the PCF, the SFIO, and the MRP.

A brief look back is necessary to note a rapprochement that had begun between the PCF and the SFIO, which led to the publication of a manifesto of the socialist-communist understanding committee. This manifesto expanded the scope of nationalizations compared to a communist text submitted to the Assembly three days earlier. The list of nationalizations included coal mines, iron and bauxite mines, cement production, land and air transport, and heavy industry. This rapprochement between the two main left-wing parties reached its limits when, on June 12, the PCF proposed to the SFIO a charter of working-class unity but conditioned their reunification with the SFIO on the acceptance of the "dialectical materialism of Marx and Engels, enriched by Lenin and Stalin." The reunification did not occur, but attempts to unify the left were revived in late August 1945 by the CGT, which formed a left-wing delegation excluding the MRP. This effort resulted, on November 6, 1945, in a programme intended as a refinement of the CNR programme. The 1945 programme was no more detailed than the CNR programme regarding social security but specified the conditions for the nationalizations envisioned in the manifesto: transfer of capital to the state and management by bipartite councils composed of workers and representatives of the general interest.

Clear divergences appeared in the MRP programme, published on November 8, two days after the left-wing programme. The MRP programme provided for the nationalization of the Bank of France but not other banks. However, the scope of enterprises was no less extensive than that of the left, though the state's management methods varied, ranging from state-run enterprises to production cooperatives. Both the left and the MRP sought to revise the February 22 ordinance on works councils to introduce worker participation in management.

Charles de Gaulle, unanimously elected president of a tripartite government on November 21, 1945, initially expressed reservations about programmes but ultimately implemented a nationalization programme, in line with promises made by René Pleven to the Provisional Consultative Assembly in July 1945, that was a compromise between the left-wing and MRP programmes:

- December 2, 1945: nationalization of the Bank of France and four major commercial banks.
- January 18, 1946: submission to the Assembly of bills on the nationalization of electricity and gas.

In disagreement with the Constituent Assembly over the conception of the state and the role of parties, de Gaulle resigned on January 20, 1946. Regarding the nationalization of banks, he had to use his full authority to ensure that the two largest investment banks (Bank of Paris and the Netherlands and Banque de l'Union Parisienne) were not nationalized. De Gaulle also ensured, with the support of the MRP and SFIO, that former shareholders were properly compensated. The confiscation of Renault was an exception.

After de Gaulle's departure, the new President of the Council, Félix Gouin, announced that defending the franc was a priority. Among the proposed savings was a significant reduction in the overhead costs of nationalized establishments. The adoption of the law on the nationalization of electricity and gas was laborious, with the MRP and SFIO advocating for a more decentralized system than that proposed by the communist minister Marcel Paul. MRP deputies ultimately voted for the law after submitting 77 amendments, which were generally not adopted. The nationalization of insurance companies was also a source of contention, with the communists demanding the total nationalization of the sector, while the socialists called for the nationalization of 48 companies, representing 65% of the sector. A series of measures was adopted by the Constituent Assembly in the week of April 23 to April 26, before it adjourned for the referendum on May 5:

- February 21, 1946: restoration of the 40-hour workweek law;
- March 28, 1946: adoption of the law on the nationalization of electricity and gas;
- April 24, 1946: nationalization of major insurance companies;
- April 25, 1946: expansion of the number and responsibilities of works councils;
- April 26, 1946: generalization of social security, including old-age pensions.

The constitutional referendum was a failure for the left-wing parties and thus a success for the MRP, which campaigned for a "no" vote. The Assembly was dissolved, and the MRP, becoming France's leading party, saw one of its members, Georges Bidault, appointed President of the Council. During the election campaigns, the three major parties continued to affirm their loyalty to the CNR programme. In reality, there was no longer a consensus for further nationalizations. The PCF alone proposed the nationalization of thermal resources and the steel industry. The law on the status of the French civil service, presented by Maurice Thorez, was the only measure that could be described as a structural reform.

- October 19, 1946: law on the status of the French civil service.

With 28% of the vote, the PCF emerged strengthened from the legislative elections of November 10, 1946 and sought to present itself as a governing party. Thus, Maurice Thorez declared in an interview with the British newspaper The Times that there were "other paths for the progress of socialism than that followed by the Russian communists". However, after failing to secure the presidency of the government, Thorez was disavowed by his party's central committee, which declared on November 27 that "nationalizations are not socialist measures... The primary condition for introducing socialism in a country is the establishment of a socialist state." The PCF thus reverted to its 1943 positions. The MRP, while continuing to affirm its fidelity to the CNR programme, increasingly emphasized the return of economic freedom. The SFIO was practically alone in advocating for further nationalizations. The project concerning the main maritime shipping companies was significantly watered down by the MRP and the radicals. The start of the Cold War and the dismissal of communist ministers on May 5, 1947, marked the end of a phase of French political life tied to the CNR programme.

== Genealogy of the economic and social reforms of the Liberation ==
While the legislators of the 1944–1947 period explicitly linked their legislative work to the CNR programme, these economic and social measures can also be placed in a broader perspective. Various authors have addressed the question of rupture or continuity with the preceding period, that of the Vichy regime.

Regarding social rights, the restoration of trade union freedoms appears as a clear break from the Labour Charter of October 4, 1941 of Vichy, or more precisely, the Labour Charter was a parenthesis in the evolution of French labour law.

In terms of social protection and planning, continuity predominates. The set of social measures follows the main lines of social protection, spanning from the Third Republic to the Fourth Republic through the Vichy regime and the Liberation of France. For Richard Kuisel, in certain aspects, Vichy and the Resistance together opposed the Third Republic:

Despite obvious differences, the reforms proposed by Vichy and the Resistance had many points in common. Both aimed at national renewal, social reconciliation, moral restoration, a fairer planned economy, and a more dynamic state.

Robert Paxton also highlights the continuity of the senior administrative personnel implementing the reforms:

Certainly, the Fourth Republic would revert, in this case as in many others, to the practices of the Third Republic—some of the five-year plans would be submitted to parliamentary review—but civil servants retained a role in the national economy that was far more reminiscent of Vichy than the pre-war period.

In the pension system, the principle of pay-as-you-go was not explicitly provided for in the CNR programme but had already been implemented by the Vichy regime. Pierre Laroque, considered the "father of social security," was a member of the cabinet of the Minister of Labour René Belin at the start of the occupation. This cabinet published a report in September 1940 that proposed replacing various affinity-based funds with a single departmental fund responsible for managing paid leave, family allowances, and the health component of social insurance. It was also planned that a National Solidarity Fund would take responsibility for the entire pension branch. While Laroque was familiar with the social protection system established by Belin, having joined London in June 1943, he was also aware of the ideas developed by William Beveridge in his 1942 report, from which the principles of the welfare state in the Anglo-Saxon world largely derive. According to Belin himself, Laroque drew more from the Beveridge reports than from the September 1940 project in which he was involved.

== Legacy ==
=== Hiatus ===
After serving as an emblematic symbol recognized by the actors of the Liberation during the 1944–1947 period, the CNR programme faded from public discourse for nearly half a century, starting in 1947 with the onset of the Cold War and the founding of the RPF, which marked the definitive end of the unity born from the Resistance.

From 1972 to 1981, during discussions of the Common Programme among left-wing parties, the memory of the CNR programme was not revived. Claire Andrieu explains this oversight by noting that the bipolarization of political life and the issue of the Union of the Left made references to an experience of national unity inopportune. It was only after the collapse of communist regimes in Eastern Europe, symbolized by the Fall of the Berlin Wall, and the apparent success of liberal economic concepts termed neoliberalism, that the reference to the CNR programme, with its strong dirigiste content, regained relevance.

=== Resurgence in 1994 and the sixtieth anniversary (2004) ===
In 1994, the President of the Republic presided over a commemoration honoring the CNR and its programme. However, as early as 1993, the communist daily L'Humanité rediscovered the text, making it a symbol of an economy based on a strong public service.

A communist, Jacques Nikonoff, president of the ATTAC France movement, organized an appeal on the occasion of the sixtieth anniversary of the CNR programme's adoption, launched on March 10, 2004, by former resistants. The appeal drew a parallel between neoliberalism and the financial powers denounced in the original text, concluding with the slogan "To create is to resist. To resist is to create." Thirteen particularly illustrious resistants signed the text: Lucie Aubrac, Raymond Aubrac, Henri Bartoli, Daniel Cordier, Philippe Dechartre, Georges Guingouin, Stéphane Hessel, Maurice Kriegel-Valrimont, Lise London, Georges Séguy, Germaine Tillion, Jean-Pierre Vernant, and Maurice Voutey.

In 2010, one of the signatories of the sixtieth anniversary appeal, Stéphane Hessel, then aged 93, published a pamphlet, Indignez-vous !, which met with great success. In the text, Hessel extensively referenced the CNR programme, asserting that "the entire foundation of the social achievements of the Resistance is now being called into question." The text concluded with the same slogan from the sixtieth anniversary appeal: "To create is to resist. To resist is to create."

During the 2022 French presidential election, Fabien Roussel, the French Communist Party candidate, used the slogan and title "For a France of Happy Days" for his programme, in homage to the CNR programme.

=== Controversies ===
In an editorial in the magazine Challenges in October 2007, which Claire Andrieu described in 2011 as brilliant and provocative before refuting its arguments, Denis Kessler, former vice-president of the MEDEF, also used "the CNR programme" to refer to the set of 1945 reforms:

The French social model is the pure product of the National Council of the Resistance. A compromise between Gaullists and communists. It is high time to reform it, and the government is working on it. The successive announcements of various reforms by the government may give an impression of a patchwork, as they seem varied, of unequal importance, and with diverse impacts: the status of the French civil service, special pension schemes, overhaul of social security, paritarism... On closer inspection, one realizes there is a profound unity to this ambitious programme. The list of reforms? It's simple: take everything established between 1944 and 1952, without exception. That's it. Today, it's about moving beyond 1945 and methodically dismantling the National Council of the Resistance programme!

== Bibliography ==
- National Council of the Resistance. "March 15, 1944". Programme du Conseil national de la Résistance [Programme of the National Council of the Resistance] (in French).
- Collective (2011). Les jours heureux [Happy Days]. La Découverte. ISBN 978-2-7071-6914-3. BnF 424341876.
- Rocard, Michel (2012). Programme du Conseil national de la Résistance [Programme of the National Council of the Resistance]. Quoi de Neuf ?. Elytis. ISBN 978-2-35639-088-2.
- Collective (2023). À la conquête de Jours heureux [In pursuit of Happy Days]. Hors-Série. L'Humanité.
- "Compte rendu de Les jours heureux. Le programme du CNR de mars 1944" [Review of Happy Days. The CNR programme of March 1944]. Monde(s) du XXIe.
- Andrieu, Claire (1984). Le Programme commun de la Résistance. Des idées dans la guerre [The common programme of the Resistance. Ideas in the war]. L'Érudit.
