= Marie Reynoard =

French resistance fighter during World War II

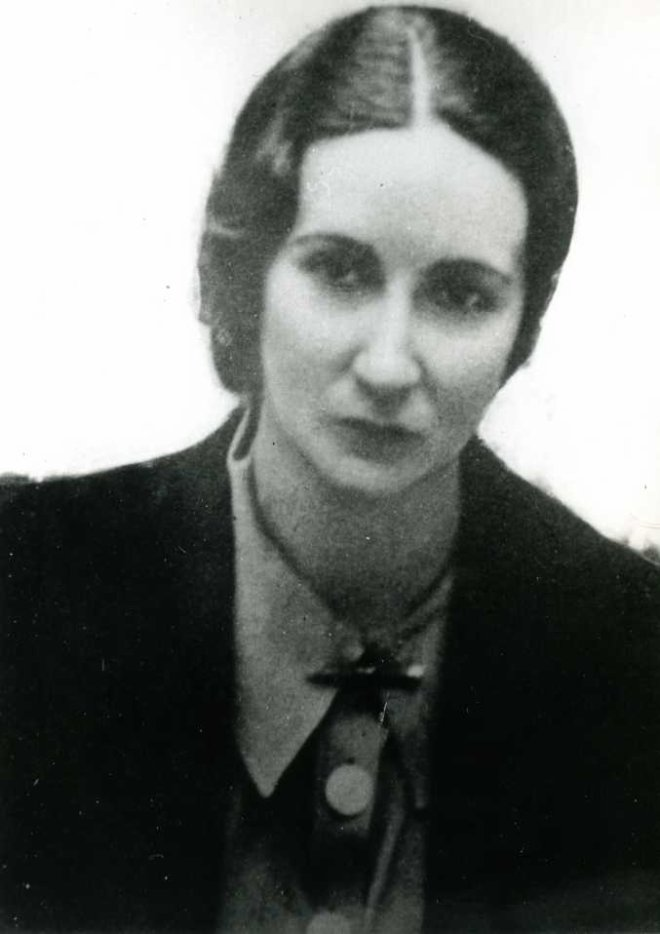
- Marie Reynoard in c. 1925
- Born: 28 October 1897; Bastia, France
- Died: 30 January 1945; Ravensbrück, Nazi Germany
- Political party: Resistance

Marie Reynoard (28 October 1897 – 30 January 1945) was a French resistance fighter. She was a heroine of the Grenoble Resistance during World War II. She died in Ravensbrück concentration camp.

== Biography ==
Marie Reynoard was born in Bastia (Haute-Corse) on 28 October 1897. A brilliant student, she joined the prestigious École normale supérieure de jeunes filles (Sèvres); in 1921, she taught in Cahors and then in Marseille, before being appointed in 1936 to the Lycée Stendhal in Grenoble.

Despite fragile health that forced her to take rest cures in the mountains, she joined the Resistance in 1940 by founding the resistance movement Vérité. During a trip to Marseille, she met Henri Frenay, leader of the National Liberation Movement. She brought together the first resistance fighters in Grenoble in her small apartment at 4 rue Joseph-Fourier. At the end of November 1941, in the presence of Henri Frenay and François de Menthon, the Vérité et Liberté movements merged under the name of French Liberation then Combat, which also became the name of the clandestine newspaper of the network.

She then took over the departmental leadership of the Combat movement. Marie Reynoard began by distributing leaflets from Lyon.

== Arrest ==
Reynoard was arrested in May 1943 in Lyon by Jean Multon, a collaborator of Klaus Barbie at the Gestapo.

== Tributes ==
In Grenoble, a commemorative plaque at the Lycée Stendhal, where she taught, has been installed, as well as at her home.

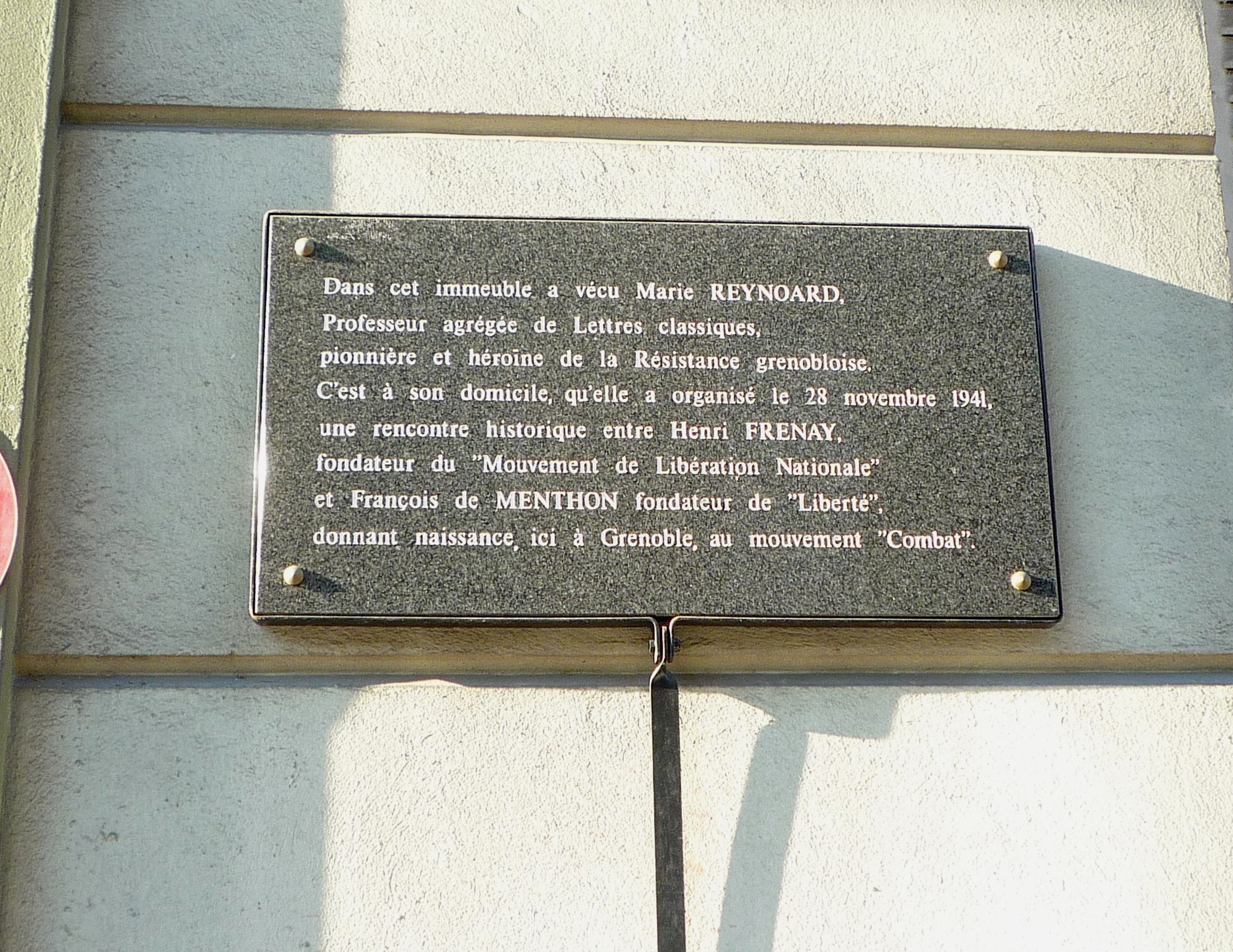
Marie Reynoard, Grenoble resistance fighter whose plaque is at 7 rue Joseph-Fourier in Grenoble.

A kindergarten and an avenue in Grenoble bear her name since 1968, a residence for students since September 2013. Also bear her name in the Grenoble region, a high school in Villard-Bonnot and the hall of the eco-district of Gières since 2016.

A school in Bastia, her birthplace, bears her name.

== Decorations ==
Resistance Medal, 24 April 1946

== Bibliography ==
- Fernand Garnier, Marie Reynoard, Press university of Grenoble, 1995
