= Devillers =

Devillers is a French surname. Notable people with the surname include:

- Arnaud Devillers, Roman Catholic priest
- Charles Joseph Devillers (1724–1810), French naturalist
- Henri Devillers (1914–1942), French Nazi collaborator
- Yves Devillers (born 1948), French sportsman

== See also ==
- David M. DeVillers (born 1966), U.S. Attorney
- Julia DeVillers (born 1967), American writer
- Paul DeVillers (born 1946), Canadian politician
- De Villiers, a surname
