= Indigène éditions (publishing house) =

French publishing company

Indigène éditions is an independent publishing house located in Montpellier, France. Founded in 1996 by the author Jean-Pierre Barou and his partner, the author Sylvie Crossman, the company aims to create a non-hierarchical dialogue between the arts and other subjects. Indigène éditions was subject to significant media attention after the publication of Indignez-vous! by the diplomat and ex-French Resistance fighter Stéphane Hessel.

== Jean-Pierre Barou ==
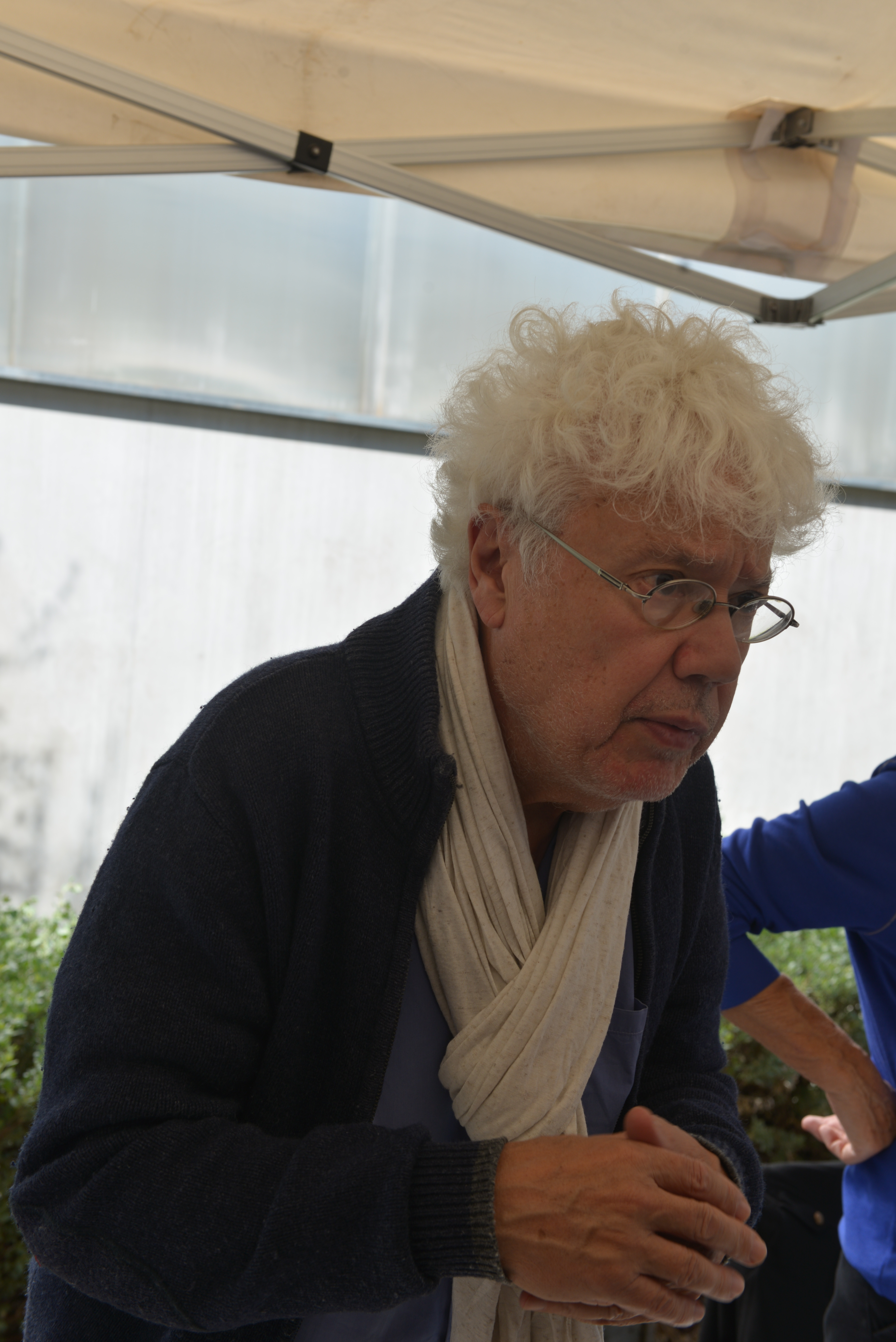
Jean-Pierre Barou (co-founder of Indigène éditions)

Jean-Pierre Barou took his initial steps into the cultural sector as an editor of the French newspaper La Cause du people, where he worked with the philosopher Jean-Paul Sartre. He later became an editor at Le Seuil, a French publisher, which is where he met Crossman. They moved to Australia together in 1985 with their son, Benjamin. They now have a daughter together as well. The couple lived in Switzerland for 2 years before settling back in France where they founded Indigène éditions.

== History of the company ==
The company was founded in 1996 by Barou and his partner, the author Sylvie Crossman. Running the company from their home in Montpellier, they aim to create a non-hierarchical dialogue between the arts and other subjects.

Indigène éditions was brought to public attention after the publication of Indignez-vous! by the diplomat and ex-French Resistance fighter Stéphane Hessel in 2010. The book was a commercial success and became a bestseller in France (where it sold 2 million copies), Germany, Italy, and Spain. It has been translated into several languages, including Italian, Portuguese, and Greek. Indignez-vous! was translated into English for US publication in 2011 as Time for Outrage.

== Publications ==
- Indignez-vous! by Stéphane Hessel, October 2010
- L'argent danse pour toi by Karl Marx, November 2010
- Je suis prof et je désobéis by Bastien Cazals, April 2009,
- Réflexions sur le fascisme économique by John Berger, March 2009
- L'Art de vivre au maximum avec le minimum by Jean-Roger Geyer, November 2009,
- Camus et sa critique libertaire de la violence by Lou Marin, February 2010
- Sartre et la violence des opprimés by Yves K., February 2010
- Rooms, Tsiganes, Voyageurs: l'éternité et après? by Claire Auzias, March 2010
- Tunisian girl, la blogueuse de la révolution by Lina Ben Mhenni, June 2011
- Place de la République pour une spiritualité laïque by Abd Al Malik, February 2015
