= Henri Devillers =

Henri Devillers (10 October 1914 – 19 June 1942) was a V-mann (agent for penetration) for the Abwehr III F (Nazi counter-espionage).

Devillers was taken prisoner in 1940, and obtained his freedom in exchange for promising to work for the German services who assigned to the Hachette messageries. Once a week, he made a link between Paris, Vichy and Lyon.

Introduced to the Lyon chapter of the Combat resistance organisation, he won the confidence of Henri Frenay, Maurice Chevance and Berty Albrecht. In Paris, he gained the appreciation of Jane Sivadon1, Odile Kienlen and Robert Guédon. He passed the mail to his German handler to read, before sending it on to its destination.

Devillers was detected by counter-espionage of the armée de l'armistice and arrested by the Surveillance du Territoire towards the end of January 1942. Foiled, he was tried and sentenced to death. He was shot by a platoon of the Lyon garrison on 19 June 1942.
