= Jean Multon =

Defector from the French resistance

John Multon
- Born: 3 July 1908; Preuilly-sur-Claise, France
- Died: 10 September 1946 (aged 38); Fort de Montrouge, Hauts-de-Seine, France
- Cause of death: Execution by firing squad
- Other name: Lunel
- Occupation: Insurance agent
- Known for: Defector from the French Resistance

John Multon, alias Lunel (3 July 1908 - 10 September 1946), was a defector from the French Resistance who became an agent of the SIPO-SD (Gestapo) of Marseille.

== Biography ==
An insurance agent in Vienne, John Multon in October 1942 joined a group of young people from Poitou who were determined to reach England via Spain. But the project failed and Multon ended up in Marseille where he met Henri Aubry and Jacques Baumel. He joined the Combat group and quickly became the secretary, and even "'the confidant'", of the regional leader of this movement, Maurice Chevance, aka Bertin who was also the first regional leader Mouvements Unis de la Résistance.

Arrested along with Benjamin Cremieux April 23, 1943 by the Gestapo in Marseille at the tavern Charley, 20 Boulevard Garibaldi, Multon talked without any physical coercion against him and accepted the proposal of Ernst Dunker, aka Delage, to work with the German authorities. This shift would have dramatic consequences for the French Resistance because Multon was very familiar with the operation of the organization in Marseille and Lyon.

The activity of Multon as a double agent is well known thanks to testimonies written by Dunker and found on the premises of the SIPO-SD Marseille in September 1944, after the Liberation. This report indicates that Multon "'was made available to the Service of Lyon as counter-agent, after working successfully for the benefit of German services in Marseille'."

Multon gave two advantages to the KDS of Lyon. First, thanks to a resistance fighter at Marseille, Charles Le Couster, arrested May 15, he was aware of the mailbox that Suzanne Dumoulin kept at 10 rue Bouteille had put at the service of the Résistance-Fer of the MUR. Then, because he had the means to contact Henri Frenay through the mailbox of the Hotel de Bourgogne in Mâcon, which information was provided by Berty Albrecht whom he had met at a meeting held in Marseille in early April 1943 at the home of Chevance-Bertin.

Multon returned to Lyon on May 24 and immediately started serving Klaus Barbie, head of the SD department IV of KDS. He teamed with Robert Moog, a French agent of the Abwehr - Dijon lent to SIPO-SD by Lyon.

In the hours following the arrival of Multon in Lyon, the two men set up a Gestapo team in Ms. Dumoulin's lodge. She was arrested and her mailbox put under surveillance. Such monitoring led to another arrest, that of Marie Reynoard who showed up at Ms. Dumoulin one or two days later to call on her talents as a seamstress. This especially allowed the KDS Lyon to intercept an unencrypted messages that Henri Aubry asked his secretary, Ms. Raisin, to deposit in the mailbox of 14 rue Bouteille. The message, written in clear text, was intended for René Hardy, alias Didot, to prevent a meeting on June 9 at 9 am with General Delestraint at the entrance of the metro station La Muette in Paris. The KDS Lyon obviously intercepted the message and immediately alerted the German authorities of Paris. On the other hand, Aubry forgot to prevent Delestraint and Hardy when he found out that the mailbox was compromised since the liaisons Combat broadcast information from the arrest of Mary Reynoard.

Multon and Moog set up a rendezvous with Berty Albrecht on May 28 at the l'hôtel de Bourgogne in Mâcon. This was a trap, aided by Delestraz Edmee, and aimed especially at Henri Frenay. But he was preparing his trip to London where he has to attend an important meeting with General de Gaulle and did not go. Only Berty Albrecht was arrested and sent to Fresnes where she committed suicide.

On the evening of June 7, Multon and Moog took the train to Lyon Perrache to return to Paris where a trap was organized by Eugen Kramer, head of the Abwehr, at l'hôtel Lutetia, to seize the General Delestraint. But Hardy, who ignored the rendezvous with Delestraint, took the same train to Paris to meet Jean-Guy Bernard. Hardy and Multon, who met him once in Marseille, recognize him. Hardy still decides to take the train. Despite the reluctance of Multon (Hardy changed his appearance since they met in Marseille and Hardy is not known by his real name Multon and Moog), Moog decided to have Hardy arrested at Chalon-sur-Saône where he was given to the Feldgendarmerie before being taken over by Barbie himself. Released in the evening of June 10, it is not known under what conditions he was released and he did not let his comrades and leaders of the Resistance know about his arrest.

Meanwhile, Multon and Moog, who continued their journey to Paris, June 9 participate in the arrest of General Delestraint who also trained cells from Joseph Gastaldo and Jean-Louis Theobald.

Following this series of arrests, SD of Lyon and Abwehr got the information they need to identify the main leaders of the French Resistance and lead them to Jean Moulin. They no longer needed Multon and he took a vacation with his family in Preuilly-sur-Claise, his native village in Touraine. He remained there until July 14 before returning to Lyon where the Gestapo ordered him to return to Marseille.

In Marseille, Multon continued to turn in resistance fighters and to participate in their arrest, which was the case for Roger Morange, head of TR in Marseille in November 1943

Multon, after having taken refuge in North Africa in the spring of 1944, was able to join in the Liberation Army and took part in the landing in Provence. Arrested on Feb. 7, 1945, he was sentenced to death and shot at Fort Montrouge on September 10, 1946.

Compared to that of Dunker, the execution of Multon, who nevertheless played a central role in the arrest of several leaders of the Resistance, took place quickly. The trials of Multon and Hardy were separate.

== Film ==
In the TV film Jean Moulin by Yves Boisset (2002), the role of Lunel (pseudonym of Jean Multon) was played by François Négret.

== Bibliography ==
- Mencherini, Madeleine (April 2011). Midi rouge, ombres et lumières, 3, Résistance et Occupation (1940-1944) (in French). Paris: Éditions Syllepse. ISBN 978-2-84950-300-3. p. 500-501.
- Baudouin, Robert (1962). Histoire des Groupes Francs (M.U.R.) des Bouches-du-Rhône (de septembre 1943 à la Libération) (in French). Paris: PUF., p. 31-33
- Cordier, Daniel (1999). Jean Moulin. La République des catacombes (in French). Paris: Gallimard, Folio Histoire. ISBN 978-2070355204.
- Azéma, Jean-Pierre (2006). Jean Moulin : le politique, le rebelle, le résistant (in French). Perrin. ISBN 978-2262025175.
- Baynac, Jacques (2007). Présumé Jean Moulin (1940-1943) (in French). PGrasset. ISBN 978-2-246-62811-8.
- Noguères, Henri (1976). Histoire de la Résistance en France, tome 3, octobre 1943-mai 1944 (in French). Editions France Loisirs., p. 681-682
- Guérin, Alain (2002). Chronique de la Résistance (in French). Robert Laffont. ISBN 978-2258084407.
- Guiral, Pierre (1974). Libération de Marseille (in French). coll. La Libération de la France, Hachette Littérature., p. 66.
- Frenay, Henri (1973). La Nuit finira (in French). Paris: Robert Laffont, Hachette Littérature., (reditied in 2006, Paris, Michalon, collection
- de Bénouville, Guillain (1947). Le Sacrifice du matin (in French). Paris: Robert Laffont., p. 371.
