= Bollier =

Bollier may refer to:

== People ==
- André Bollier (1920–1944), French member of the French Resistance during WWII
- Barbara Bollier (born 1958), American politician
- Bobby Bollier (born 1989), American swimmer
- David Bollier, American activist, writer, and policy strategist
- Edwin Bollier, Swiss businessman

== Places ==
- Bollier, Queensland, a locality in the Gympie Region, Queensland, Australia
