= Lunel =

Lunel may refer to:

== People ==
- Armand Lunel (1892–1977), French writer
- Folquet de Lunel (1244–1300), French troubadour
- Gerard of Lunel (1275–1298), French saint
- Jean Multon (1908–1946), French double-agent who went by the alias Lunel
- Magali Lunel (born 1975), French journalist and television personality

== Places ==
- Canton of Lunel, France
- Lunel, Hérault, France
- Lunel-Viel, Hérault, France
