= Jean-Pierre Barou =

French publisher

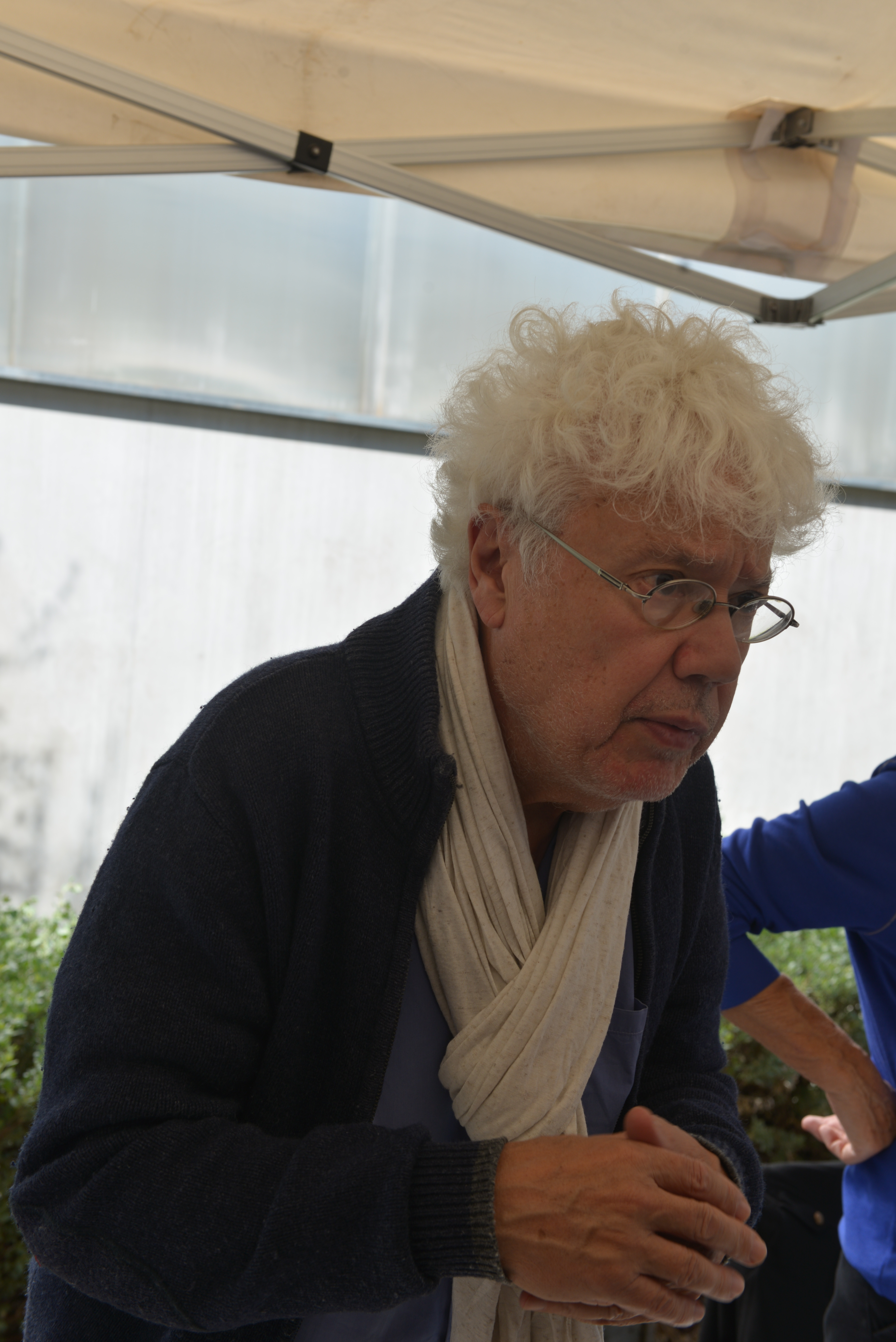
Barou in 2015

Jean-Pierre Barou (born 1940) is a French author and journalist. His mother was a seamstress. After studying engineering, he very quickly became involved in militant action as an editor of avant-garde magazines and also as an active member of the Proletarian Left. He now owns a small publishing house in Montpellier with Sylvia Crossman.

== Biography ==
Barou took his initial steps into the cultural sector as an editor of the French newspaper La Cause du people where he worked with his friend Jean-Paul Sartre. He later became the editor at Le Seuil where he met his partner Sylvie Crossman. They moved to Australia in 1985 with their son, Benjamin. Barou and Crossman returned to Europe a few years later, living in Switzerland for two years before settling back in France. It was here that Barou and Crossman founded their independent publishing house Indigène éditions. They publish a wide range of works with the aim of creating a non-hierarchical dialogue between the arts and other subjects. They have recently launched a box set of feminist writings. Most notably, Indigène éditions published Indignez-vous! by Stéphane Hessel in 2010 which quickly became a bestseller in France, Germany, Italy and Spain. The manifesto sold over 2 million copies in France and was translated into English for US publication as Time for Outrage! in 2011.

== Work ==
Barou has worked with the philosophers Michel Foucault, Vladimir Jankélévitch, and Simone de Beauvoir. Barou is particularly interested in the Spanish Civil War and in Indigenous Australians, having organised a large exhibition of Aboriginal art at Musée Fabre in the 1990s with his partner. He is also interested in human rights and as such interviewed Nobel Prize laureate and human rights activist Andrei Sakharov for the New York Review in March, 1989.

== Publications ==
- De la liberté de la presse à la presse de la liberté, Bruxelles (La Taupe, 1970).
- The Eye of Power (in collaboration with M. Foucault and M. Perrot) in The Panopticon of Jeremy Bentham, Seuil, 1984.
- L'Œil pense, Essai sur les arts primitifs contemporains, Payot, 'Petite Bibliothèque Payot', 1996.
- Matisse ou le miracle de Collioure (preface by M. Déon), Payot, 'Petit Bibliothèque Payot', 2005.
- Sartre, Le temps des révoltes (2006, Stock)
- Gilda je t'aime, A bas le travail (La France sauvage, Gallimard, 1975)
- Le Courage de la non-violence (Indigène, 2012)
- La Guerre d'Espagne ne fait que commencer (Seuil, 2015)
- Hamlet, au nom de la résistance, coll. "Écritures de spectacle", éd. Deuxième époque, Montpellier, 2023.
