= Combat (French Resistance) =

French Resistance movement during World War II

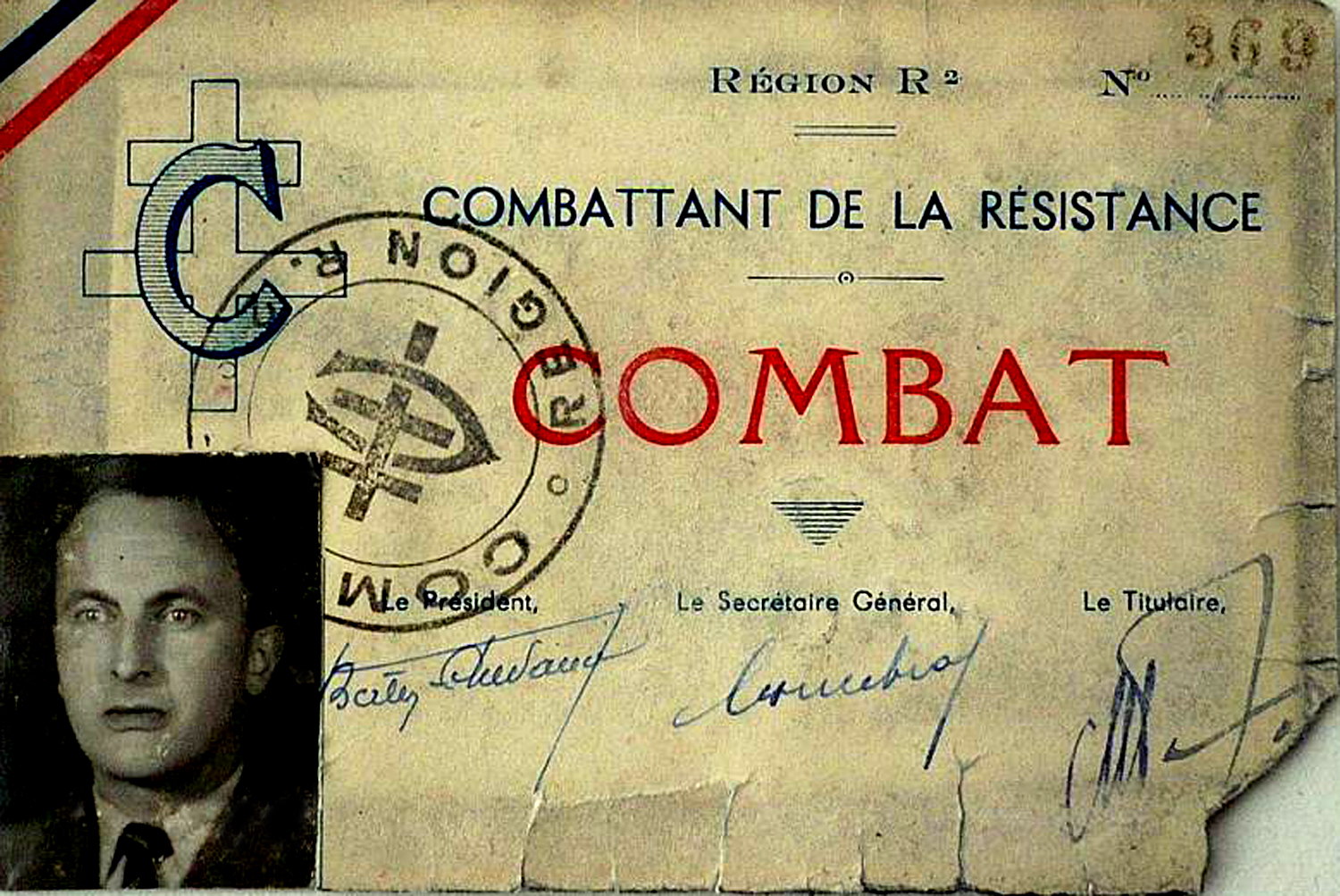
ID from a combat member active in Marseille (Région R2).

Combat was a large movement in the French Resistance created in the non-occupied zone of France during the World War II (1939–1945).

Combat was one of the eight great resistance movements which constituted the Conseil national de la Résistance.

== Combat's development ==
Combat, also known under its former name National Liberation Movement (MLN), was active both in the unoccupied zone in southern France and in the occupied north.

=== Birth and growth ===
Combat was created in August 1940 in Lyon by Henri Frenay, supported by Berty Albrecht. Through a system of regional heads, he spread the movement through six regions within the free zone:

- Lyon (10 départements)................... (R1) led jointly by Marcel Peck and André Plaisantin
- Marseille (7 départements)............... (R2)
- Montpellier (6 départements)............ (R3)
- Toulouse (9 départements)............... (R4)
- Limoges (9 départements)................ (R5), led until 1943 by Edmond Michelet
- Clermont-Ferrand (5 départements)... (R6)

New regions appeared later, particularly in the north of France (e.g. Jura and Brittany).

Little by little, the MLN (subsequently renamed the Mouvement de Libération Française), merged with other smaller networks in the regions where it took root. On merging with the Liberté network at the end of 1941, the movement took on the name of Combat. At this point, however, Combat took a Gaullist approach, causing a split with other networks which tended towards Philippe Pétain. The break caused Combat's sources of information to be diminished somewhat. A satellite organization by the name of Combat Zone nord, was also created in the occupied zone, specifically in Paris. The organiser was Robert Guédon, called Robert. Combat Zone nord proved to be quite active, quickly growing its network into several regions of the occupied zone such as the Nord-Pas-de-Calais .

=== Initial obstacles ===
Among the initial Combat members planted in the occupied zone, there was an agent of the Abwehr, Henri Devillers, involved in linking and communications between the parts of the movement in the free and occupied zones. Jean-Paul Lien, another member of combat, learned about Devilliers' treachery by accident from two German agents. Lien alerted Henri Frenay, who had no power to stop Devilliers. 47 members of Combat were arrested, 31 by the Gestapo and 16 by the French police, of whom only two would be released. They were tried by the Volkgerichthof (people's tribunal) and 23 were sentenced to death; this was referred to as the affaire Continent. The movement was completely disbanded in the occupied zone between the end of 1941 and the beginning of 1942. Frenay decided not to rebuild there but to concentrate all his efforts in the free zone. A new movement was born from the ashes of Combat Zone nord, Ceux de la Résistance, founded by[[[Jacques Lecompte-Boine]] [[[:fr:[Jacques Lecompte-Boine|fr]]]].

Frenay also declined repeated offers to put himself at the service of the Deuxième Bureau of the Vichy Regime or of the Intelligence service of London, preferring to keep his independence and continue to fight for France alone rather than a foreign power.

In the beginning of summer 1942, another network called Carte, which was directly linked to the British Special Operations Executive and therefore better armed at that time than the other French networks in the free zone, took over two of Combat's groups on the Côte d'Azur. Frenay sent a message to the SOE asking them to stop taking his teams away from him. It did not happen again. This may have been due to the displeasure expressed by Frenay in his message, or alternatively to the invasion of the free zone by the Germans a few months later.

=== 1943 ===
After the Allies landed in North Africa, the Germans invaded the free zone. This plunged Combat undercover, since they now had to deal with the well-organised Gestapo. Secrecy and security measures were reinforced. Messages were encrypted, rendezvous locations were specified by letters and generally were moved to outside Lyon, which became by degrees the capital of the French resistance. Arrests took place from February onwards, followed by escapes. Combat was infiltrated by Gestapo and Abwehr agents.

In January, the idea of amalgamating the three big resistance movements of the south (Combat, Libération and Franc-tireurs) gradually gained ground, culminating between February and March in Mouvements Unis de la Résistance (MUR). The steering committee of each movement lost much of its importance. Combat was represented on the steering committee of the MUR by Frenay, who was also the commissioner on military affairs of the three networks. The press of the three movements remained independent, and Combat's newspaper continued to exist in its own right. Combat's structure was unchanged by its affiliation to the MUR; it retained a steering committee, and branches for political and military affairs among others.

== Internal organisation ==
Combat was led by a steering committee, over which Frenay permanently presided. In March 1943, the other five members were Georges Bidault, Claude Bourdet, Maurice Chevance, Alfred Coste-Floret, François de Menthon (former head of Liberté), et Pierre-Henri Teitgen. In January 1943, Combat contained a total of 14 specialised services and more than 100 permanent agents, paid by the network.

The network was split into four branches:

- External relations, led by Pierre de Bénouville. This oversaw a delegation to Switzerland, relations with the United States of America and the British services. The external relations branch became indispensable at the start of 1943, when Combat needed money and armaments which the English were slow in providing. One member of the branch, Phillippe Monod, made contact with the American Office of Strategic Services in Switzerland to procure these. The external branch became larger and more organized. The American OSS promised to give aid to the French resistance in the future, but this promise was not followed up after the British embassy opposed it, and General Charles de Gaulle forbade any further discussion on the matter.
- Military affairs, led by Maurice Chevance, included the Groupes Francs of Jacques Renouvin, the Armée secrète, the Maquis, and the Sabotage-Fer led by René Hardy.
- Political affairs, led by Claude Bourdet, oversaw propaganda, the information service of Jean Gemahling.
- The general secretariat, led by Berty Albrecht, was in charge of general services including lodging, false papers, finance and the service sociale (the service social was established in 1941, and allocated a small pension, income, goods and food to the families of resistance members who had been captured.)

Initially Combat was mainly financed through gifts coming from all over France, solicited by Frenay from high-ranking members of society. This situation changed quickly, however, and soon most resources were provided from London, through the agency of Jean Moulin. At the beginning of 1943, the money received by Combat from London went up to five million Francs, of which Libération received 1.5 million, and Franc-Tireur, just under a million.

Moulin tried to separate the different activities of the network, particularly the information and the Choc (shock, heavy military operations), following directions given to him in London. He finally won his case when the MUR was created.

== Activities and operations ==
=== The secret press ===
The activities of Combat originally revolved around the dispersal of information using secret newspapers. These pieces of information were provided to Frenay initially from army offices, then, after the disbandment of the French army, from the Deuxième Bureau of the Vichy regime. Combat quickly distanced itself from Vichy, after which information was gathered through various resistance groups with which Combat had links. These pieces of information fed into newspapers which were published from time to time. In the beginning Frenay mainly distributed bulletins in army offices; these bulletins stopped after the army broke up.

In the occupied zone, the newspaper Les Petites Ailes du Nord et du Pas-de-Calais (little wings of the North and Pas-de-Calais) appeared. In time it became Les Petites Ailes de France, then Résistance. In the free zone, an underground newspaper was established, modelled on Petites Ailes de France. Its name was Vérités (Truths). Vérité (Truth) had been considered for the name, but was judged too philosophical; according to Frenay, the truth was difficult, if not impossible to express. After the merger of Combat with Liberté, Vérités was scuttled and its place taken by a new newspaper bearing the name of the network, Combat.

Other small journals also saw the light of day, but gradually separated from the Combat movement. Examples are Veritas (French newspaper) and the Catholic-oriented Témoignage chrétien] (Christian witness notebooks). These journals, particularly the important ones, contained propaganda articles against the Vichy regime, which revealed and criticised the actions of the government and state apparatus, as well as substantive pieces dealing with e.g. Nazism or collaboration. Frenay generally constructed the editorial of the Combat newspaper in person, until he joined de Gaulle in Algeria. The subtitle of the Combat newspaper was Organe du Mouvement de la Libération Française, accompanied by a quote from Georges Clemenceau: "Dans la guerre comme dans la paix, le dernier mot est à ceux qui ne se rendent jamais." (In war as in peace, the last word is theirs that never surrender). In 1943, a section Attentats (attacks) was added to the paper; it contained a list of the paramilitary operations of Combat.

The first issue of the Combat newspaper appeared in late 1941 in Lyon, with a press run of 10,000. André Bollier replaced Martinet, the initial printer for the movement. He distributed the printing across 14 presses in the free zone, thus reducing the need for transporting papers from Lyon, and allowing the run to be increased. In May 1944, the newspaper had a run of 250,000. Bollier was also responsible for printing Défense de la France (the future France-Soir), Action (a paper with communist sympathy), the first issues of Témoignage chrétien, and certain issues of the Franc-Tireur paper and La Voix du Nord.

=== Information ===
Alongside the underground press activities, information was sent to London by circuitous routes. These operations were directed by Jean Gemahling, from Alsace. The Noyautage des administrations publiques (infiltration of public services) was also established, with the original aim of recruiting public figures who would be able to assure the return of the republic after the Vichy regime fell. However, the NAP gradually changed direction and allowing itself necessary cooperation with public services and the ability to obtain basic information about German army movements. The NAP-police were created, whose members would warn their comrades about forthcoming arrests. Another branch, the NAP-fer led by René Hardy, provided the Groupes Francs with schedules of German supply trains from 1943. The NAP also operated within the customs service.

=== The Groupes de Choc ===
The Groupes de Choc were set up, generally specializing in attacks against collaborators and shopkeepers who sold collaborationist papers like the Nazi magazine Signal (the shops of the latter were generally blown up). From 1942 onwards the GC gradually merged into the Armée secrète which was assimilating by degrees the various paramilitary groups of Combat, Libération and Franc-Tireur. This merging was encouraged by Frenay and Moulin, who wanted the operations of the GC remained separate from any intelligence and propaganda activities. For this reason, the leadership of the Armée Secrète was not conferred upon Frenay as he had initially wanted (his movement being more significant than the other two members of the MUR) but rather upon the division general Charles Delestraint, who was recruited by the chef de Combat.

The Sabotage and Maquis sections were added to the network in 1943.

=== Groupes Francs ===
Frenay put Jacques Renouvin in charge of mounting Groupes Francs, mobile armed squads, in each of the six regions covered by the network. They were organised in the Choc branch of the network. They worked independently of the Armée Secrète but in contact with it to organise their operations and provide intelligence.

The Groupes Frances organised their operations on their own initiative, following the general framework which was given them. They communicated the results of their operations to the steering committee.

Before November 1942, the operations of the Groupes Francs were similar to those of the Groups de Choc. They were responsible for obtaining their own arms from supply dumps or police posts, and making their own explosives or stealing them from mines.

After the German invasion of the free zone in November 1942, the Groups Francs changed their operations style. They were ordered to attack trains containing German soldiers or going to Germany, to sabotage railway lines, to destroy arms factories and dumps and to assassinate Gestapo agents. The GF were supplied and armed by Britain through parachute dumps which provided them with Sten guns, pistols, ammunition, explosives, grenades and other equipment.

The GF also organised escapes for captured resistance fighters such as that of Paul Reynaud (planned and prepared but never executed) and the successful escape of Berty Albrecht who was being held at the Lyon-Bron psychiatric hospital.

In January 1943, Jacques Renouvin, was arrested by the Gestapo getting off a train. He was held in Fresnes prison. A commando raid was mounted to free him but all its members were arrested. Renouvin was deported to Mauthausen concentration camp where he died. He was replaced as head of the GF by a member of Libération.

=== The Maquis ===
In 1943 the steering committee of Combat learned that refugees from the Service du travail obligatoire forced labour had fled to Haute-Savoie and the Maquis had been created in the mountainous massifs. The service Maquis was established in Combat's Military affairs branch with the aim of helping all those who had "taken the maquis" to survive and to fight, and of providing them lives and armaments, and of integrating them into Combat's network. While the objective for Combat was to develop, oversee and organise these armed groups, there were some divisions relating to this at the heart of the MUR; some, like Charles Delestraint, saw the Maquis as actual pockets of resistance within French territory, whereas others like Frenay saw them as armed bands operating by ambush and disappearing once their mission was accomplished.

== Political orientation and activities ==
Combat had Christian-conservative and Gaullist political leanings. Its founder, Henri Frenay, was a staunch right-winger and anti-Communist. Among his deputies, Renouvin and Bénouville had been active in the far-right Action Française. Bénouville, a Catholic monarchist, had left AF for the secret terrorist network La Cagoule in 1934. In Montpellier, Combat members painted the words "I would never have collaborated!" on the base of the equestrian statue of Louis XIV in the promenade du Peyrou.

The Montpellier leaders of Combat, Courtin and Teitgen, were involved in organising the Comité Général d'Etudes, which acted as an underground Conseil d'État.

After liberation, several members of Combat (Bidault, Menthon, Teitgen) formed the Christian democratic party Popular Republican Movement as a pro-Gaullist counterweight to French Communist Party on 26 November 1944, with Bidault as its first leader. The MRP became the main party of the right, linked with the international social Catholic movement and opposed in its pursuit of European integration to the influence of both the Soviet Union and the United States. It pursued hardline colonial policies in Vietnam and Algeria on the basis of French national interests, and refused to invite international military assistance. Bidault went further than his party in his support for French Algeria by allegedly enlisting in the OAS. Bénouville, who followed a different political path in the Gaullist Rally of the French People and its successors Union for the New Republic and Union of Democrats for the Republic, similarly backed the Algerian ultras by joining Jacques Soustelle's Union pour le salut et le renouveau de l'Algérie française in 1958. He later praised António de Oliveira Salazar as the "wise man of the West".

== Some members of Combat ==
- Berty Albrecht, chargé of the General Secretariat Général and Henri Frenay's girlfriend
- Pierre de Bénouville, (Lahire), director of external relations
- Jean-Guy Bernard, general secretary of Combat
- Georges Bidault, member of the Combat steering committee
- Claude Bourdet, political adjunct
- Albert Camus, philosopher, author, dramatist, and journalist
- Maurice Chevance (Barrioz-Bertin), military adjunct
- Alfred Coste-Floret, member of Combat steering committee
- René Courtin, leader of Combat in Montpellier with Pierre-Henri Teitgen
- Benjamin Crémieux, (Lamy), organised information network from Marseille
- Marcel Degliame
- Henri Devillers, member of Combat-zone north, double agent of the Abwehr
- Jacques Dhont
- Antoinette Feuerwerker, educator and jurist, wife of David Feuerwerker
- David Feuerwerker, rabbi of Brive (Corrèze, Creuse, Lot)
- Henri Frenay, founder of the network
- Lieutenant Pierre de Froment (Deblé), member of Combat-zone north
- Jean Gemähling
- Robert Guédon (Robert), chief of Combat-zone north
- René Hardy
- Achille Lacroix, Mayor of the town of Narbonne
- Jean-Paul Lien
- François de Menthon, head of the Liberté network which merged with Combat in 1941
- Edmond Michelet, with David and antoinette Feuerwerk
- Philippe Monod, member of the delegation of Combat to Switzerland
- Marcel Peck, regional chief of R1
- André Plaisantin, regional chief of R1
- Joseph-Paul Rambaud, former senator for l'Ariège
- Jacques Renouvin, organiser of the Groupes Francs
- Jane Sivadon (Jeannette), member of Combat-zone north
- Pierre-Henri Teitgen, member of Combat steering committee
- Rose Warfman (Rose Gluck), nurse, deportee, Auschwitz survivor, with Edmond Michelet

and many others.

== Bibliography ==
- Capelle, Russell Beckett (1958), The Role of the M.R.P. in French Foreign Policy 1944–1954 (PDF), PhD thesis: Boston University
- Dard, Olivier [in French] (2022), "Pierre de Bénouville (1914-2001) : En première ligne sur tous les fronts", in Florian Michel, Yann Raison du Cleuziou (ed.), À la droite du Père : Les catholiques et les droites de 1945 à nos jours, Paris: Éditions du Seuil, pp. 68–71, ISBN 978-2-02-147233-2
- Fink, Carole (1989). Marc Bloch: A Life in History. Cambridge: Cambridge University Press. ISBN 978-0-52140-671-0.
- Frenay, Henri (1973). La nuit finira, Mémoires de Résistance 1940-1945. Éditions Robert Laffont.
- Miannay, Patrice (2005). Dictionnaire des agents doubles dans la Résistance. Le Cherche Midi.
- Rioux, Jean-Pierre [in French] (1987), The Fourth Republic, 1944–1958, translated by Godfrey Rogers, Cambridge: Cambridge University Press, ISBN 0-521-25238-5
- Schöttler, Peter (2022), "Marc Bloch in the French Resistance" (PDF), History Workshop Journal, 93, translated by Jane Caplan: 3–22, doi:10.1093/hwj/dbac014
