= Time for Outrage! =

2010 political essay by Stéphane Hessel calling for civic indignation

- Author: Stéphane Hessel
- Original title: Indignez-vous !
- Language: French
- Genre: Essay
- Published: 21 October 2010
- Publisher: Indigène éditions
- Publication place: France
- Pages: 32
- ISBN: 978-2-911939-76-1
- Followed by: Engagez-vous !

First edition (publ. Indigène)

Time for Outrage! is the English translation of the bestselling tract Indignez-vous ! by the French diplomat, member of the French Resistance and concentration camp survivor Stéphane Hessel. Published in France in 2010, it has sold nearly 1.5 million copies in France and has been translated into numerous other languages.

== Content ==
In this essay, Stéphane Hessel calls, drawing on the “Sartrean” idea of personal commitment, for resistance to wealth inequality. He criticizes the immigration policies of the Fillon governments, denounces the influence of the financial world on political decision-making, and condemns the weakening of the social legacy of the National Council of the Resistance (notably social security and the pension system). A section entitled “My indignation concerning Palestine” addresses the situation imposed by the State of Israel on the Palestinian territories, particularly the Gaza Strip.

== Origins of the work ==
The writing of the book was proposed to Stéphane Hessel by Sylvie Crossman and Jean-Pierre Barou, two politically engaged journalists, founders of the publishing house Indigène, after they heard the speech he delivered on the Glières Plateau, a site of remembrance of the French Resistance, in which he denounced what he described as a betrayal of the principles of the National Council of the Resistance, for which he blamed President Nicolas Sarkozy.

The speech that Sarkozy, then a candidate in the presidential election, delivered between the two rounds of voting on May 4, 2007, on the Glières Plateau had indeed provoked the indignation of former deportee Walter Bassan and his friends. This indignation was shared by a number of other former resistance fighters, who organized an annual counter-commemoration at Glières. They drew on the spirit of the Appeal commemorating the sixtieth anniversary of the Programme of the National Council of the Resistance of March 15, 1944, signed three years earlier, on March 8, 2004, by major surviving figures of the French Resistance, including Lucie Aubrac, Raymond Aubrac, Henri Bartoli, Daniel Cordier, Philippe Dechartre, Georges Guingouin, Stéphane Hessel, Maurice Kriegel-Valrimont, Lise London, Georges Séguy, Germaine Tillion, Jean-Pierre Vernant, and Maurice Voutey.

In 2008, Walter Bassan’s friends formed an association, Citoyens Résistants d’Hier et d’Aujourd’hui, of which Stéphane Hessel was one of the patrons, alongside Raymond Aubrac and John Berger. The appeal of March 8, 2004 (already read at the first gathering on May 13, 2007) was broadcast again on May 17, 2009, at Glières, and was followed by a speech delivered in the presence of Raymond Aubrac and four thousand supporters, in which Stéphane Hessel called for a duty of indignation.

These positions, initiated by the same former resistance fighters during the affairs involving undocumented immigrants at Saint-Ambroise and Saint-Bernard, and reaffirmed since 2004, formed the basis for the writing of the book. The text was developed through three interviews conducted in the spring of 2010. Edited by Sylvie Crossman, it was approved by Stéphane Hessel.

== Reception ==
Published by a small Montpellier-based publishing house, Indigène éditions, the book initially received no media promotion. Nevertheless, the 32-page volume, sold for €3.10, quickly became a publishing phenomenon, selling more than 300,000 copies within three months, and reaching 950,000 copies sold within ten months.

The success is partly attributed to the figure of its author, Stéphane Hessel, born in Germany in 1917 to a Jewish father (who later converted to Christianity), a member of the French Resistance against Nazism, a deportee to Buchenwald, and secretary of the United Nations Commission on Human Rights when it drafted the Universal Declaration of Human Rights, and later a diplomat aligned with the political left. The format itself, a short text sold at a very low price, also likely facilitated its wide dissemination.

The book’s success also stems from the parallels drawn by Hessel between the ideas promoted by the authors of the Program of the National Council of the Resistance, such as civic political engagement, the primacy of the public interest over financial interests, trade unionism, and intergenerational solidarity, and the issues that provoked his indignation in the contemporary world: the existence of undocumented immigrants, environmental degradation, and global wealth inequality. Published on the same day that the 2010 French pension reform was passed, the book appeared to resonate with a broader climate of discontent and unease in French society. According to Edgar Morin, it represented a “public awakening of a people who had until then been very passive,” and this literary enthusiasm was seen as embodying a renewed form of civic engagement outside traditional political parties.

=== Criticism of the work in France ===
Following strong public enthusiasm and extensive, largely favorable media coverage, criticism began to appear in the French media in December 2010 and January 2011. These critiques denounced the status of an untouchable icon attributed to the author.

The first major criticism directed at Stéphane Hessel concerned the passage of his text devoted to the situation in the Gaza Strip. On the website of the Representative Council of French Jewish Institutions, Marc Knobel wrote that “Stéphane Hessel attempts to justify, if not legitimize, terrorism.”

Others criticized him for not being as subversive as the title suggests, pointing to his proximity to social democracy as embodied in France by figures such as Michel Rocard, Dominique Strauss-Kahn, or Martine Aubry.

For Boris Cyrulnik, indignation also has an instinctive and non-rational character. This weakness of reasoning was likewise criticized by Luc Ferry, who argued that it reflects a politics of emotion rather than a “politics of justice.”

Pierre Assouline, for his part, saw in Indignez-vous! a text “dripping with good intentions” that claims the right to speak in the name of the ideals of the Resistance, urges contemporaries “to engage under the sway of emotion rather than reflection,” and displays an indignation of “variable geometry,” reserved for Israel, described as a “reviled country.”

In May 2011, linguist Jean Szlamowicz published an essay entitled Détrompez-vous!, in which he reproached Indignez-vous! for factual approximations and for exhibiting Manichaeism and demagoguery.

Lawyer Gilles-William Goldnadel published, in 2012, the pamphlet Le vieil homme m'indigne, in which he denounced what he described as the “emptiness” of Stéphane Hessel’s thinking, accusing him of “indulgence toward antisemitic terrorism” and of a “pathologically anti-Western” mindset.

In March 2011, Stéphane Hessel published Engagez-vous!, a book based on interviews with the young writer Gilles Vanderpooten. This more comprehensive work, produced in September 2009 (and therefore before Indignez-vous!), inadvertently addressed a number of criticisms leveled at the earlier volume.

=== Reception of the work in Germany ===
This small book was one of the rare French works to enjoy significant media success in Germany even before being translated into German. It was widely discussed in the German press.

== Influences ==
=== Protests ===
The May 2011 protests in Spain were influenced by this essay, and participants referred to themselves as the “indignant ones” (indignados), in reference to Stéphane Hessel’s work.

Other European protests (Athens, Liège, Brussels, Paris, etc.) as well as American movements such as Occupy Wall Street are also reported to have been influenced by this work, following in the wake of the Spanish demonstrations.

=== Parodies, satirical versions, and pamphlets ===
The work was repeatedly parodied, usually retaining the same format as the original, with around thirty pages. In February 2011, J'y crois pas ! was published, written under the pseudonym Orimont Bolacre and released by David Reinharc on behalf of the Parti de l’In-nocence. It was subtitled “Response to Stéphane Hessel at the request of Renaud Camus.”

In April 2011, the publisher 12 bis released an erotic-political parody titled Enfilez-vous !, written under the pseudonym Rafaël Borgia and illustrated by Luz.

The publisher Dargaud released Épilez-vous !, written under the pseudonym Aristophane Aisselle and illustrated by Pénélope Bagieu.

In October 2011, Swiss National Councillor Oskar Freysinger published, with Antifa, a pamphlet-style response to Stéphane Hessel.

More broadly, Indignez-vous! helped revive a trend for pamphlets in booklet form. At Buchet-Chastel, Daniel de Roulet expressed his indignation at the state of nuclear power plants in a booklet entitled Tu n’as rien vu à Fukushima.

=== Artistic influence ===
The group Petits Chanteurs d'Asnières recorded, in December 2011, a single also entitled Indignez-vous!, paying tribute to Stéphane Hessel.

Tony Gatlif directed a documentary film, Indignados (2012), described as “freely inspired” by Stéphane Hessel’s work.

The band HK & Les Saltimbanks, on their second album Les Temps modernes (2012), perform the song Indignez-vous!, as a tribute to Stéphane Hessel, notably with the refrain: “Indignez-vous! It is an old man speaking to you, brandishing his star—do you hear?”

On her 2012 album Tout tourne autour du soleil, Keny Arkana wrote a song entitled Indignados, in which she refers to the events of the preceding years; the chorus proclaims: “Indignant, rise up.”

== Editions and translations ==
- Indignez-vous !. Ceux qui marchent contre le vent (in French). Montpellier: Indigène éditions. 2010. p. 32. ISBN 978-2-911939-76-1.
- Indignez-vous ! (in French). Éditions Rue de l’échiquier – Indigène. 2025. p. 62. ISBN 978-2-37425-512-5.
- Indignez-vous, la violente espérance de Stéphane Hessel (in French). Indigène éditions. 2022. ISBN 978-2-37595-113-2.
- Time for outrage!. Translated by Damion Searls; Alba Arrikha. London: Quartet Books. 2011. p. 40. ISBN 978-0-7043-7222-1.
- Empört Euch! (in German). Translated by Michael Kogon. Berlin: Ullstein-Verlag. 2011. ISBN 978-3-550-08883-4.
- Indignați-vă! (in Romanian). Translated by Adriana Bădescu. Bucharest: Nemira. 2011. ISBN 978-606-579-198-5.
- ¡Indignaos! (in Spanish). Translated by Telmo Moreno Lanaspa. Destino. 2011. ISBN 978-842-334-471-0.
- Neem het niet! (in Dutch). Translated by Hannie Vermeer-Pardoen. Amsterdam: Van Gennep. 2011. ISBN 978-946-164-038-3.
- Indignatevi! (in Italian). Translated by Maurizia Balmelli. Turin: Add. 2011. p. 61. ISBN 9788896873250.
- Säg ifrån! (in Swedish). Translated by Ulla Bruncrona. Louise Lindfors Förlag. 2011. ISBN 978-9163385070.
- Indignádevos!. Ágora K (in Galician). Translated by Fernando Moreiras. Pontevedra: Faktoría K de Libros. 2011. ISBN 978-84-15250-06-7.
- Indigneu-vos! (in Catalan). Translated by Maria Llopis. Barcelona: Columna Edicions. 2011. ISBN 978-84-9710-202-5.
- תזעמו! (in Hebrew). Translated by Iatrogenico. Ein Ashan Hafakot. 2011.
- Indignu! (in Esperanto). Translated by World Anational Association. 2011.
- Indignatz-ve (in Occitan). Translated by Claudia Labandés. Per Noste. 2013. ISBN 978-2-86866-102-9.
- Hiddətlənin! (in Azerbaijani). Translated by Yalchin Mammadov. Qanun. 2012. ISBN 978-9952-26-350-3.
- Haserretu zaitezte! (in Basque). Translated by Inma Errea Cleix. Denonartean. 2011. ISBN 978-84-96634-62-6.
- ¡Indigneu-vos! (in Valencian). Translated by Edicions Mosseguello C.B. Edicions Mosseguello. 2011. ISBN 978-84-938137-3-4.

== Radio programmes ==
- "« Indignez-vous ! » : l'étonnante histoire du texte de Stéphane Hessel" [“Indignez-vous!”: the astonishing story of Stéphane Hessel’s text]. La terre au carré – France Inter (in French). September 2, 2025.
