= Pierre de Froment =

French WWII resistance fighter

Georges-Pierre de Froment (alias Pierre Foureix and Deblé) (17 November 1913 – 14 November 2006) was a French soldier and a member of the Second World War resistance.

== Early life and background ==
Froment was born in Châteauroux, in the garrison town of his father. His father was a graduate of the Saint-Cyr military academies who had been killed leading his company in Artois in May 1915. De Froment enrolled at Saint-Cyr and, after a standard beginning to his career, in 1939 he was sent on as special mission to Poland, where he was present for the debacle. He returned to France and, in May 1940, took part in operations to block the German army which had crossed the Meuse.

== Resistance (1940-1943) ==
After the French army's defeat, Froment met Captain Henri Frenay in Marseille towards the beginning of September 1940. Frenay was engaged in forming an embryonic resistance movement, which became Combat, the most important movement in the zone libre. Frenay made de Froment his representative in the occupied zone. It was de Froment's responsibility to create a massive information network in the north, assigned directly to passing on clandestine news which Frenay intended would inform the general population and promote a spirit of resistance. Along with Frenay, Robert Guédon and Jacques-Yves Mulliez, Froment was involved in the creation of the newspaper Les Petites Ailes de France, which was first circulated on 17 May 1941. Towards the beginning of February 1942, Combat Zone Nord, the group led by Guédon and to which de Froment was attached, was scourged by a wave of arrests. Greatly isolated, de Froment nonetheless continued to expand his network in industrial and railway circles across the whole of the zone occupée.

== Deportation (1943-1945) ==
On 14 January 1943, de Froment, whose hideout had been spotted by a treacherous comrade, was arrested by two men from the Abwehr. He was imprisoned in Fresnes prison and, in summer 1943. deported to Mauthausen concentration camp in Austria. In May 1945, the camp was liberated by Americans. Terribly weakened, de Froment reached France and recuperated in the sanatorium at Briançon where, in 1946, he transcribed the history of his deportation to Mauthausen. Published in 2004, it is a text infused with fervent Christian humanism.

== After the war ==
- 1947: Reintegrated into the French army.
- 1953: École supérieure de guerre. After graduation, he became military attaché for four years in Yugoslavia and Albania.
- 1961: Arrived in Algeria as adjoint of the sector commandant of Blida. After the Algiers putsch of 1961, became commandant of Blida sector.
- 1962-1964: Head of Action Service of the SDECE (Service de documentation extérieure et de contre-espionnage).
- He ended his career as général de division at the head of the 44th région militaire at Toulouse, in 1973.

Pierre de Froment died at Moulins in Allier. He was buried in the cemetery at Montlevicq in Indre.

== Decorations ==
- Grand-Croix de l'Ordre national du Mérite
- Grand Officier de la Légion d'honneur
- Médaille de la Résistance

== See also ==
- (in French) Henri Frenay, Volontaires de la nuit, Robert Laffont, 1975 and La Nuit Finira, Robert Laffont, 1973 re-edited Michalon 2006.
