= Berty Albrecht =

French Resistance fighter

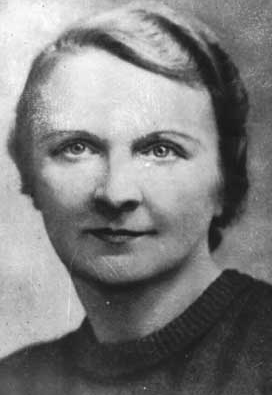
- Born: Berthe Wild; 15 February 1893; Marseille, France
- Died: 31 May 1943 (aged 50); Fresnes prison, near Paris
- Resting place: Monument to combattants in WW II, Mount Valérien, Suresnes, France
- Known for: Resistance to the Nazi occupation of France

Berty Albrecht (15 February 1893 – 31 May 1943) was a French feminist and French Resistance martyr of the Second World War.

== Pre-war life ==
Berthe Wild was born into a Protestant family of Swiss origin, but of the Marseille bourgeoisie. She studied in Marseille and then in Lausanne, and obtained her nursing diploma in June 1912. She worked in a military hospital during World War I. In 1919 she married a Dutch financier, Frédéric Albrecht, with whom she had two children, Frédéric (born in 1920) and Mireille (born in 1924). The couple lived first in the Netherlands, and then moved to London in 1924. It was in London that she met English feminists and became active in trying to improve the condition of women.

Albrecht's husband's business failed after the 1929 financial crisis and the ensuing depression. They agreed that it would be better for her to return to France (initially to their house in Beauvallon, near Sainte-Maxime on the French Riviera) in order to save money. Separated (but not divorced) from her husband, she and her children moved back to Paris.^{:64-65}

There, she forged a friendship with Victor Basch, a teacher at the Sorbonne and the president of the Human Rights League. Albrecht was an outspoken proponent of women's rights and she founded a feminist journal, Le Problème Sexuel (The Sexual Problem), in which she campaigned for the right to contraception and abortion. Financed by her husband, the journal published five issues, from November 1933 to June 1935.^{:83-88} In the fall of 1934, Albrecht visited the USSR and returned with a favorable impression of the Soviet Union's progress in such areas as women's rights, medical care, social assistance, schools, universities, nurseries and kindergartens.^{:88-91} In 1935, she helped found the Ethiopia Aid Committee.

In 1933, conscious of the dangers of Nazism and hostile to the Munich Accords, Albrecht welcomed German refugees (mainly Jews and political dissidents fleeing fascism) to her house in Sainte-Maxime, where she met Captain Henri Frenay, who was to survive the war and become one of the most famous living representatives of French resistance fighters. Despite their political differences (at that time, he belonged to the nationalist right wing, whereas she was actively associated with left-leaning causes), Albrecht and Frenay became both lovers and, later, co-organizers of the major resistance movement, Combat.^{:94-96}

In 1937, Berty did course work at the school of factory superintendents. She then became a social worker, working in an optical instrument factory.^{:112-115}

== Resistance ==
In 1940, Albrecht was mobilised as superintendent at Usines Fulmen, first in Clichy and then in Vierzon.^{:124-135} Dismayed by the armistice, she decided to continue to fight and moved to the Free Zone where she met up with Frenay, who had escaped from a detention center for prisoners of war in Germany.^{:135} In December 1940, Albrecht took over the production of Frenay's bi-weekly Bulletin. Together, they produced three successive journals: “Bulletins d’informations et de propagande” (Information and Propaganda Bulletins), “Les Petites Ailes” (Little Wings) and then “Vérités” (Truths), before becoming directors of the "Combat" network, one of the most important resistance organizations. Furthermore, thanks to her contacts, Pierre de Froment and Robert Guédon were able to develop their activities in the resistance.^{:168}

In 1941, Albrecht was hired as "inspector of female unemployment" for the city of Lyon. Since she was a well-known pre-war activist, Albrecht was closely watched by the French police and, no doubt, by the German military police as well. She organized a social service in the free zone that helped imprisoned activists and their families. She was arrested for the first time by the French police in January 1942. Released after three days, she was forced to resign from her position in Lyon.

She was arrested by the Vichy government, end of November 1942, placed under administrative detention and refused a lawyer or a trial. She, along with other political detainees, went on hunger strike to obtain the right to a trial and her demand was met after 13 days. After being transferred to Saint-Joseph prison in Lyon, she was judged six months later and was condemned to spend the rest of the war in an internment camp set up by the Vichy government. On November 11, 1942, the Germans invaded the Free Zone in France. Fearing deportation, she took advantage of the reigning disorder to simulate madness and was interned in a psychiatric hospital (Le Vinatier in Bron). She escaped on December 23, 1942, thanks to an operation by commandos from the Groupes Francs de Combat and her daughter, Mireille.

Refusing to leave France for England, Albrecht went into hiding, first in the Cévennes, at Durfort, then near Toulouse. She adopted a pseudonym: Victoria. At the beginning of February 1943, she joined Frenay in Cluny, finding refuge with Jeannine Frèze-Milhaud. In April 1943, Albrecht traveled to Marseilles to attend a meeting with Maurice Chevance, Marcelle Bidault, Jeannine Frèze-Milhaud and Jean Multon (who would turn out to be a double agent).^{:269-271} During this meeting, she made the mistake of revealing a contact in the Lyon region, the Hôtel de Bourgogne in Mâcon. This mistake was to prove fatal.

== Arrest and death ==
Klaus Barbie hoped to trap Henri Frenay by using Berty Albrecht as bait. He arranged for a false message to be sent to Albrecht, telling her of the arrival of a person from Marseilles whom she knew (Jean Multon, who appears to have been the person who betrayed her:^{269-271}) and who wished to give her news of Maurice Chevance, a close associate of Henri Frenay in the resistance. Berty went to the meeting and was arrested by the Abwehr and the Gestapo of Lyon on May 28, 1943, in Mâcon, in the presence of Klaus Barbie, Robert Auguste Moog and Jean Multon. While being arrested, she shouted warning to fellow resistance operatives: “Beware, friends, the Gestapo is here! ".^{:260}

In her bag, Barbie found an envelope addressed to the Gouze family in Cluny where Albrecht had spent the night. The Gestapo searched the Gouze's house and the couple was interrogated and then released. Returning empty-handed, Barbie locked Albrecht up and tortured her at the Hôtel Terminus, the headquarters of the SIPO-SD in Mâcon.^{:261}

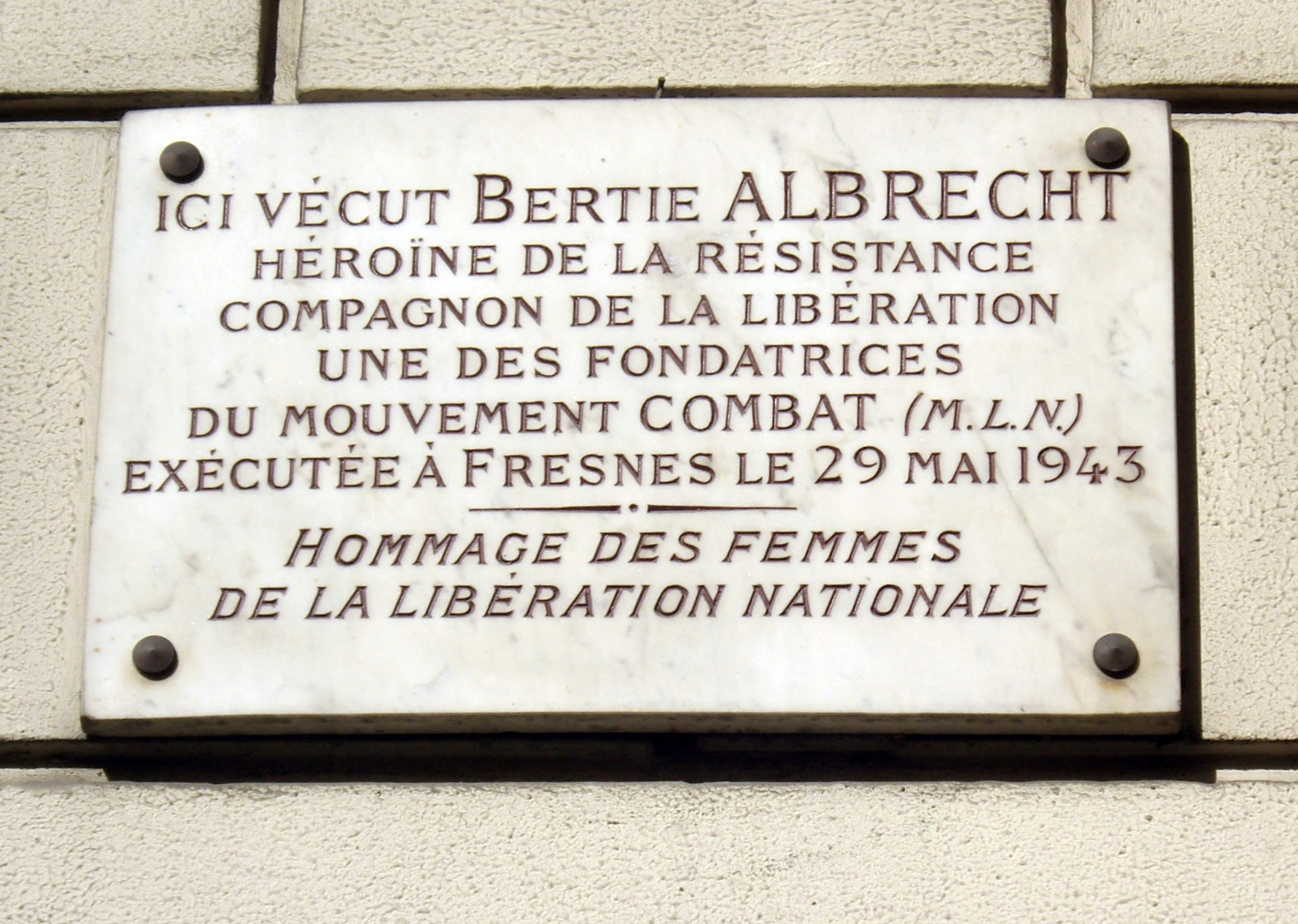
Plaque commemorating Berty Albrecht, 16 rue de l'Université, Paris

Although Barbie did not succeed in arresting Frenay, he quickly realized that Albrecht herself was an important prize. He therefore decided to move her immediately to Paris. On May 31, 1943, she was transferred to Fresnes prison near Paris, in the section for common law prisoners.

Following an additional torture session, she was found hanged the same day, probably by suicide in order to avoid revealing information to the enemy. She was said to have stated: “Life is not worth much, dying is not serious. The whole thing is to live in accordance with honor and the ideal that one has for oneself." Abrecht was buried in the prison's vegetable garden in tomb number 347.^{:266}

On August 26, 1943, she was made a Companion of the Liberation. In his tribute on October 6, 1943, Frenay declared on the BBC: "I cannot say all that France owes her, because though she is dead, the resistance is still very much alive".

== Burial and legacy ==
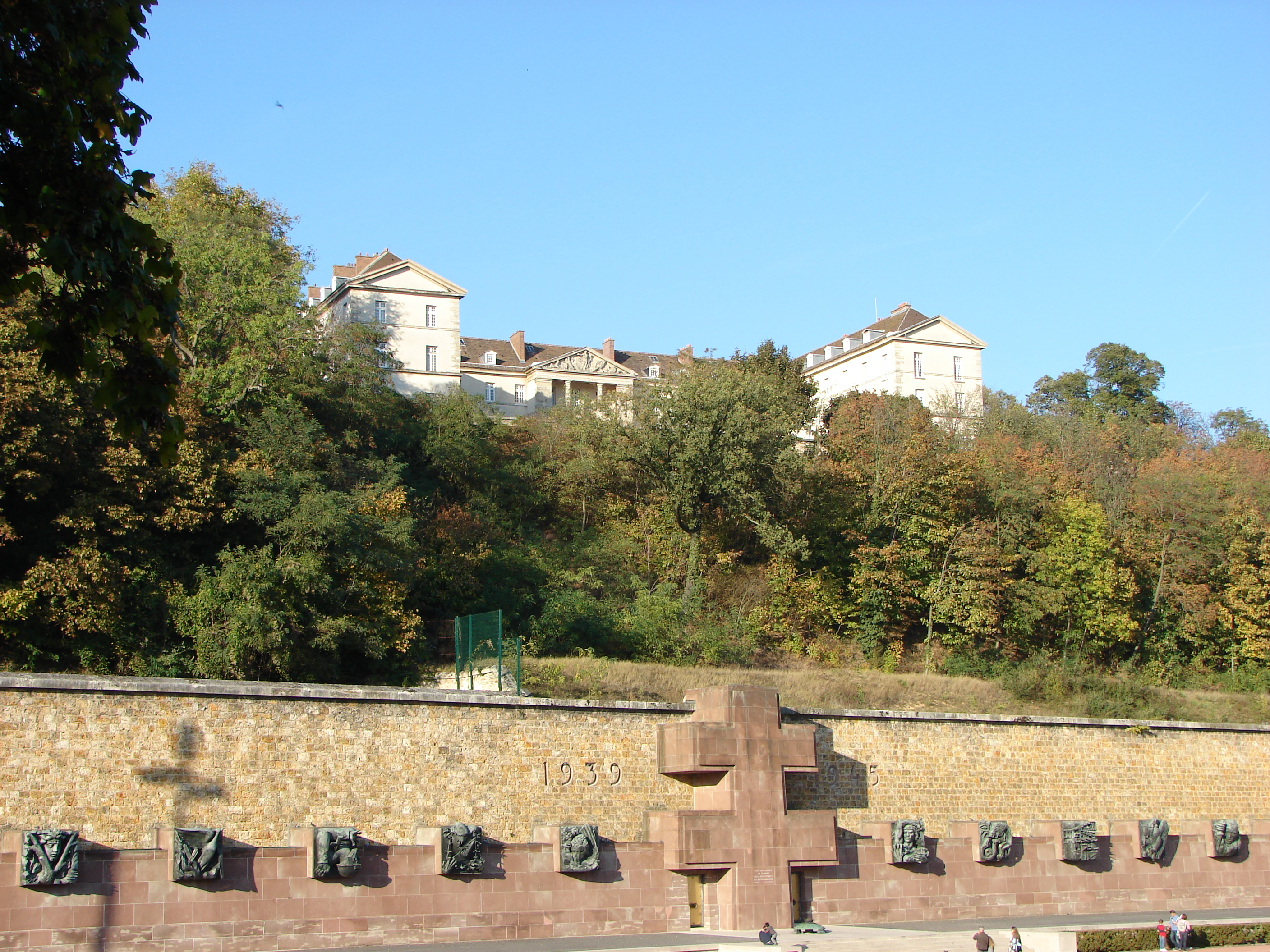
Mémorial de la France Combattante at the Fort Mount Valérien

In May 1945, Albrecht's remains were discovered in the Fresnes prison grounds. After the war, the French government decided to erect a Memorial of Fighting France (Mémorial de la France combattante) to those who died fighting in the war. Fifteen heroes of the war were to be buried at Fort Mount Valerien, in Suresnes near Paris. The fifteen were to include a man and a woman who died fighting in the Resistance. On October 29, 1945, the name of Berty Albrecht was drawn from a hat at Mont Valérien. As a result, she had the honor of being buried at Mount Valerien. The re-burial ceremony took place on November 11, 1945.^{:9-16}

Albrecht received several distinctions posthumously':

- Compagnon de la Libération (she is one of the only six women named to this order)
- Médaille militaire (posthumous)
- Croix de Guerre 1939–1945 with Army acknowledgements
- Officer of the Resistance

== See also ==
- Jeanne Bohec
