= André Bollier =

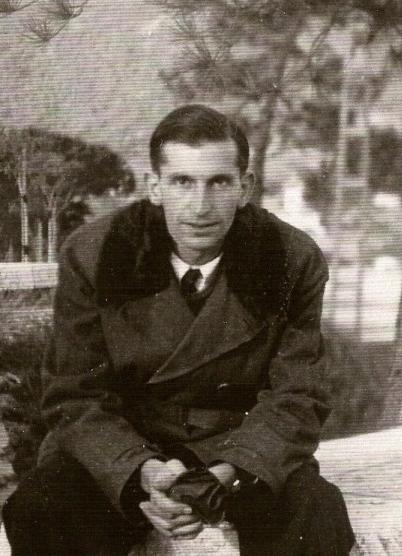
André Bollier, November 1941.

André Bollier (May 30, 1920 – June 17, 1944) was a member of the French Resistance during World War II.

== Biography ==
Bollier was born in Paris and enrolled in the École Polytechnique in 1938. He was called up for military service after his first year of studies, in September 1939, at the start of the Phoney War. He trained in Fontainebleau and was sent to Alsace in February 1940 assigned to the 68th Artillery Regiment of the 70th Infantry Division. He saw combat there and was severely wounded and captured in an engagement with German troops on June 21, 1940. Due to his injuries he was released by the Germans in November 1940 and returned to study at the Polytechnique.

In 1941, Bollier became active in the resistance participating in the distribution of the underground newspaper Les Petites Ailes (Small Wings). Following his graduation from the Polytechnique he made contact with the resistance organization Combat. He wrote in the group's newspaper, also named Combat, under the pseudonym Lefranc. His participation in effecting the escape of Berty Albrecht on December 23, 1942, caused him to be briefly arrested and subsequently to go underground. In 1943–44 he devoted himself to organizing the printing of Combat, taking over as printer from the first printer, Martinet, and turning it into a significant operation that printed over a million newspapers in several regions. During this period he used the pseudonyms Carton and Vélin.

Bollier was arrested in Lyon on March 8, 1944, and subjected to interrogation and torture. He eventually escaped on May 2, 1944, and rejoined the resistance. A little over a month later, however, on June 17, 1944, a large Gestapo and Milice force surrounded his clandestine printing office. In a shootout, Bollier was shot, and then shot himself to avoid being taken alive. Following the war, he was posthumously awarded the Ordre de la Libération.
