= Yves Devillers =

French sailor (born 1948)

Yves Devillers (born 18 August 1948) is a French sailor who competed in the 1972 Summer Olympics.
