= René Courtin =

French economist

René Courtin (1900–1964) was a French economist.

René Jean Henri Gustave Courtin, born July 27, 1900, in the 17th arrondissement of Paris, and died May 6, 1964, at the Bicêtre Hospital in Kremlin-Bicêtre, was a French economist, former resistance fighter.
