= Robert Guédon =

Robert Guédon (1902-1978) was a founding member of the French resistance in the zone occupée (occupied zone) during World War II.

== Biography ==
Guédon was an officer from the tirailleurs (a skirmishing unit) who had graduated from the Saint-Cyr military academy and had fought in the Rif. He made the acquaintance of Henri Frenay at some point during military school where he became a specialist of the 4th Bureau. Leader of a company of the French 13th motorized infantry, he was wounded by a bomb explosion at the start of the German offensive.

In collaboration with Frenay and Lieutenant Pierre de Froment, Guédon organised the Libération Nationale information and propaganda movement.

When the Combat Zone Nord group was annihilated through arrests, Guédon passed into the zone Sud. He commanded a company of the 7th regiment of Moroccan tirailleurs in Morocco until the allied landings. During the Tunisian campaign, he was head of the 4th Bureau (transport) of the Moroccan mountain division. Assigned as an instructor in a staff school, he subsequently entered the commissariat of prisoners and deportees, where Frenay charged him with organizing the future repatriation of French nationals held in Germany.

== Sources ==
- File on Colonel Guédon in the Defence Historical Service of France

== Bibliographic summary ==
- (in French) Henri Frenay : La nuit finira, Paris, Laffont, 1975
- (in French) Marie Granet et Henri Michel : Combat, histoire d'un mouvement de résistance, Paris, PUF, 1957
- (in French) FNDIRP-UNADIF : Leçons de ténèbres, Paris, Perrin, 2004
- (in French) FNDIRP-UNADIF, Bernard Filaire : Jusqu'au bout de la résistance, Paris, Stock, 1997
- (in French) Henri Noguères : Histoire de la Résistance en France, Paris, Robert Laffont, 1972
