= Combat (newspaper) =

French Resistance newspaper

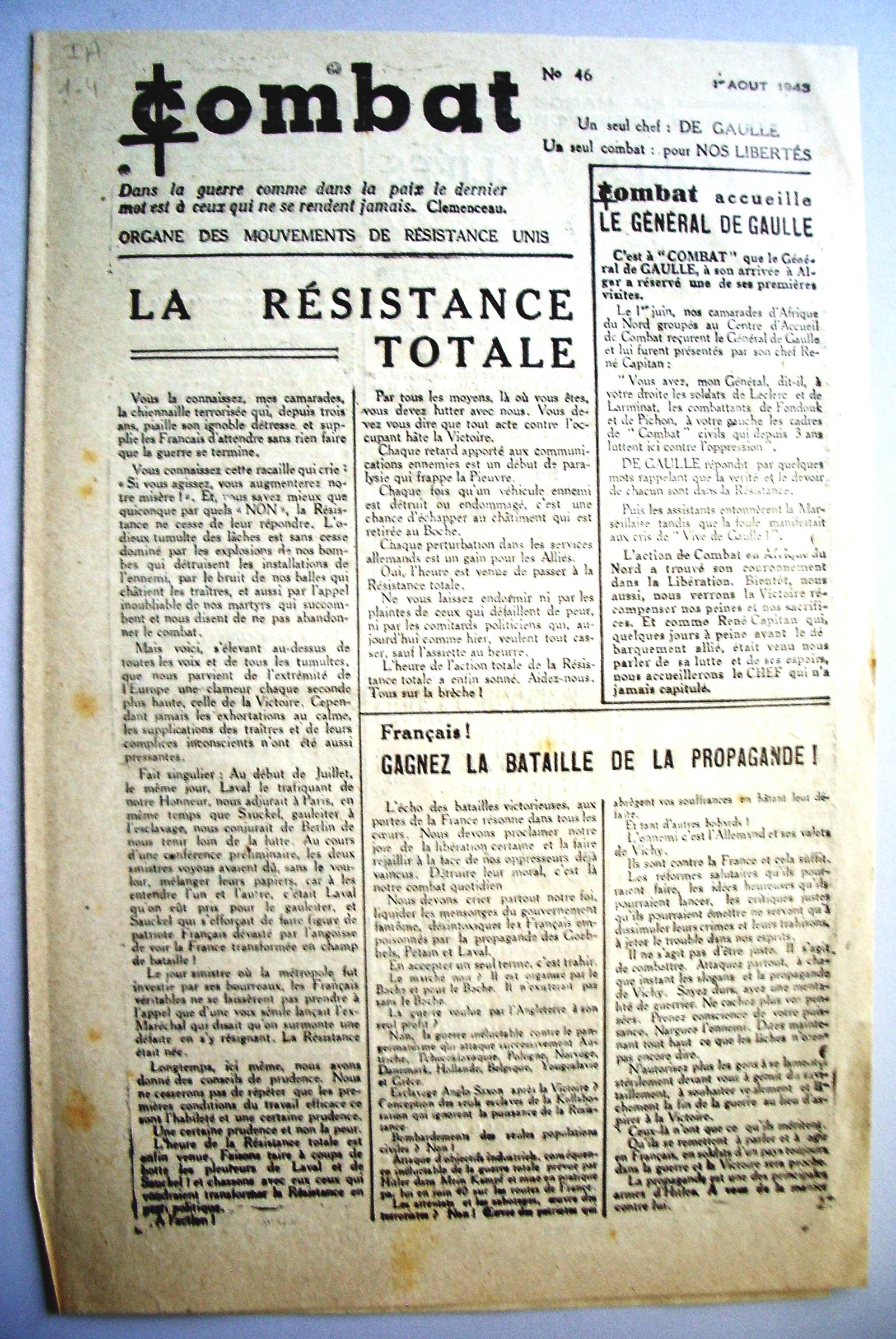
- Categories: National Press
- Frequency: daily
- Founded: December 1941
- First issue: December 1941
- Final issue: August 1974
- Country: France
- Based in: Paris
- Language: French

Combat was a French newspaper created during the Second World War. It was founded in 1941 as a clandestine newspaper of the French Resistance.

== War years ==
In August 1944, Combat took over the headquarters of L'Intransigeant in Paris, and Albert Camus became its editor in chief. The newspaper's production run decreased from 185,000 copies in January 1945 to 150,000 in August of the same year: it did not attain the circulation of other established newspapers (the Communist daily L'Humanité was publishing at the time 500,000 copies).

== Liberation ==
Following the liberation, the main participants in the publication included Albert Ollivier, Jean-Paul de Dadelsen, Jean Bloch-Michel (1912–1987), and Georges Altschuler (fr). Among leading contributors were Jean-Paul Sartre, Simone De Beauvoir, André Malraux, Emmanuel Mounier, Raymond Aron and Pierre Herbart. From 1943 to 1947, its editor-in-chief was Albert Camus. Its production was directed by André Bollier until Milice repression led to his death.

== Post-war ==
During 1946, Combat was opposed to the "game of the parties" claiming to rebuild France, and thus became closer to Charles de Gaulle without, however, becoming the official voice of his movement.

Loyal to its origins, Combat tried to become the place of expression for those who believed in creating a popular non-Communist Left movement in France. In July 1948 (more than a year after the May 1947 crisis and the expulsion of the Communist Party (ministers) from the government), Victor Fay (de), a Marxist activist, took over Combat's direction, but he failed to stop the newspaper's evolution towards more popular subjects and less political information.

In 1950, it hosted a debate about the Notre-Dame Affair stimulated by a vehement letter by André Breton in response to the editor Louis Pauwels.

Philippe Tesson (fr) became editor in chief from 1960 to 1974. Henri Smadja (fr) had thought Tesson could be a perfect puppet-editor but Smadja's situation, in part because of the Tunisian regime, got worse. In March 1974, Philippe Tesson created Le Quotidien de Paris (1974–1996), which he had conceived as the successor of Combat.

== May 1968 ==
During the May 1968 crisis, Combat supported the student movement although from a Stalinist point of view, through the signatures of the likes of Jacques-Arnaud Penent (fr). On 3 June, it published a falsified version of the Address to All Workers by the Council for Maintaining the Occupations, removing the references to the Situationist International and the attacks against the Stalinists.

== Dissolution ==
Henri Smadja died by suicide on 14 July 1974, and Combat definitively ceased to be published the following month.

== See also ==
- France in the twentieth century
- Fourth Republic (1946–1958)
