= Stéphane Hessel =

Writer, Holocaust survivor and French Resistance member

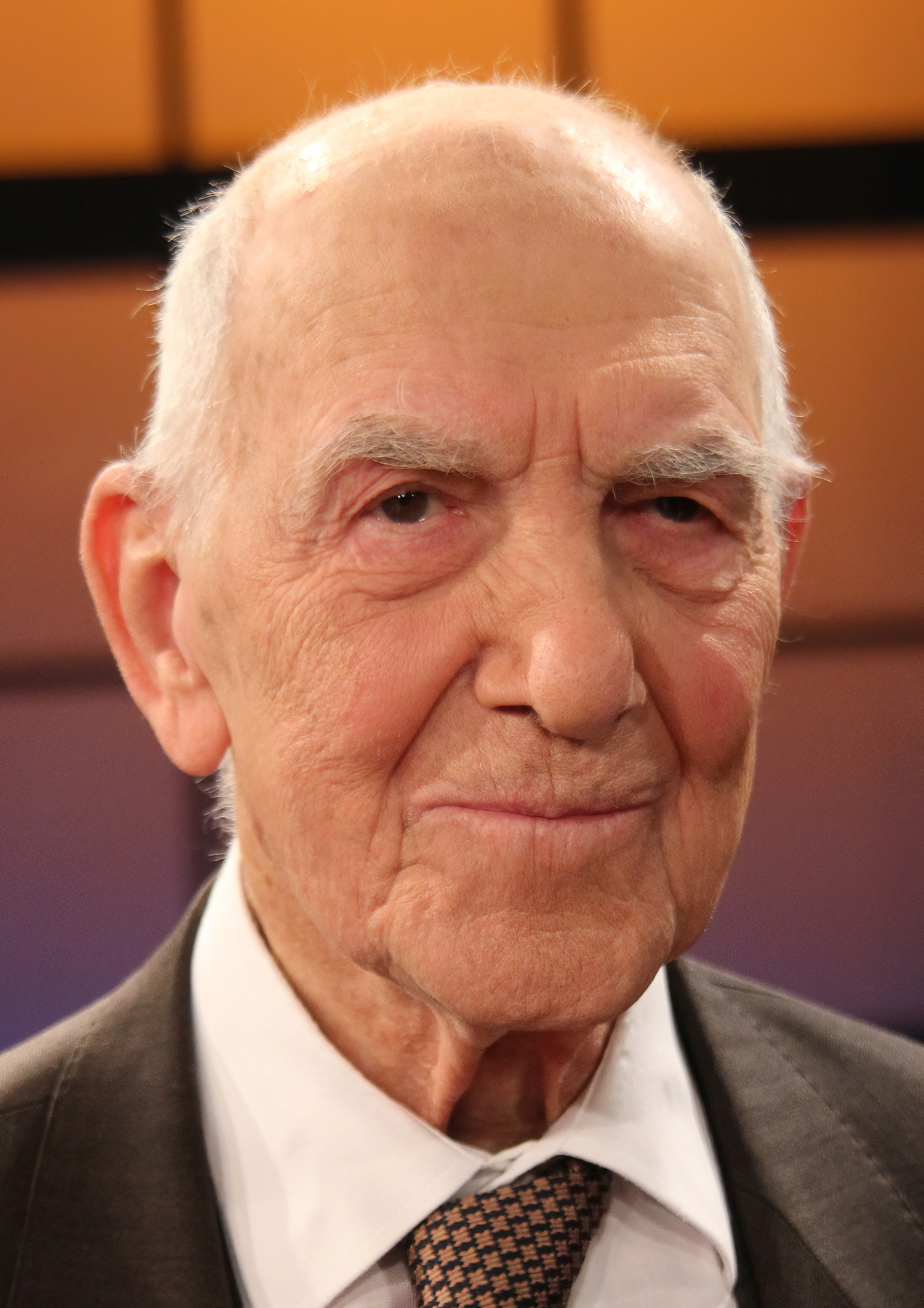
- Hessel in 2012
- Born: Stefan Friedrich Kaspar Hessel; 20 October 1917; Berlin, German Empire
- Died: 26 February 2013 (aged 95); Paris, France
- Occupations: Diplomat; ambassador
- Years active: 1946–2013
- Known for: Human rights advocacy; French Resistance member; Buchenwald survivor
- Notable work: Time for Outrage! (Indignez-vous !)
- Spouses: Vitia Guetzevich (m. 1939; died 1985); Christiane Hessel-Chabry (m. 1987)
- Children: 3
- Parents: Franz Hessel (father); Helen Grund Hessel (mother)
- Awards: Legion of Honour; Ordre du Mérite; North–South Prize; UNESCO/Bibao Prize

Stéphane Frédéric Hessel (born Stefan Friedrich Kaspar Hessel; 20 October 1917 – 26 February 2013) was a French diplomat, ambassador, writer, concentration camp survivor, Resistance member and BCRA agent. Born German, he became a naturalised French citizen in 1939. He became an observer of the editing of the Universal Declaration of Human Rights of 1948. In 2011 he was named by Foreign Policy magazine in its list of top global thinkers. In later years his activism focused on economic inequalities, the Israeli–Palestinian conflict and protection for the post–World War II social vision. His short book Time for Outrage! sold 4.5 million copies worldwide. Hessel and his book were linked and cited as an inspiration for the Spanish Indignados, the Arab Spring, the American Occupy Wall Street movement and other political movements.

== Early years ==
Stefan Friedrich Kaspar Hessel was born in Berlin, the son of journalist Helen (née Grund) and writer Franz Hessel, who inspired the characters of Jules and Kathe in Henri-Pierre Roché's novel Jules and Jim (Kathe was called Catherine in the subsequent film adaptation by François Truffaut). His paternal grandparents were Jewish immigrants who joined the Lutheran church, and his mother was from a Christian family. Hessel emigrated to Paris with his parents in 1924. Having received his baccalauréat when 15 years old, he was eventually admitted in 1939 to the École Normale Supérieure. He became a naturalized French citizen in 1939, before being mobilized later that year into the French army in Saint-Maixent-l'École. His first wife, Vitia, was the daughter of Boris Mirkin-Getzevich.

== Second World War Resistance member ==
Refusing to adhere to the Vichy government of Marshal Philippe Pétain, Hessel fled to London and joined General Charles de Gaulle's group of Resistance members in 1941, becoming a member of the Free French intelligence service (Bureau central de renseignement et d'action). He returned to France, to organize Resistance communication networks in advance of the 1944 Allied invasion of France. He was captured by the Gestapo and later deported to the Buchenwald and Dora concentration camps, where he was tortured by waterboarding. Hessel, F. F. E. Yeo-Thomas and Harry Peulevé as well as Eugen Kogon and Alfred Balachowsky, escaped execution at Buchenwald through the help of KZ Kapo Arthur Dietzsch, who exchanged their identities with three prisoners who had died of typhus. Hessel tried unsuccessfully to escape from Dora, but was able to avoid being hanged in reprisal. He later escaped during a transfer to Bergen-Belsen concentration camp, and went to Hannover, where he met the advancing troops of the United States Army.

== Human Rights advocate, diplomat ==
After the war, Hessel became assistant to Henri Laugier, vice-secretary general of the United Nations in charge of economic and social affairs, and was an observer to the editing of the Universal Declaration of Human Rights. In 1962, he created the Association for Training in Africa and Madagascar (AFTAM) and became its first president. In August 1982, Hessel was appointed for three years to the Haute Autorité de la communication audiovisuelle, the French regulatory agency for audio-visual communication. Hessel continued to hold a diplomatic passport, having been named an "ambassador for life".

He was a member of the French division of the International Decade for the Promotion of a Culture of Peace and Non-Violence for the Children of the World and was a founding member of the Collegium International and served as vice president. He was a member of the Commission nationale consultative des droits de l'homme and the Haut Conseil de la coopération internationale.

In 2003, along with other former Resistance members, he signed the petition "For a Treaty of a Social Europe" and in August 2006, he was a signatory to an appeal against the Israeli air-strikes in Lebanon. The appeal, made by the French member organization of European Jews for a Just Peace, was published in Libération and other French newspapers.

In 2004, he was awarded the North-South Prize by the Council of Europe. That same year, he participated in the commemoration of the 60th anniversary of the National Council of Resistance of 15 March 1944, which urged the younger generations to live by and pass on the legacy of the Resistance and its ideals of economic, social and cultural democracy.

On 14 July 2006, Hessel was made Grand Officier de la Légion d'honneur, having already been given the Grand Cross of the Order of Merit in 1999.

Hessel called for the French government to make funds available to provide housing for the homeless and denounced the French government's failure to comply with Article 25 of the Universal Declaration of Human Rights at the Place de la Republique on 21 February 2008.

On the 60th anniversary of the Universal Declaration of Human Rights, 10 December 2008, Hessel received the UNESCO/Bilbao Prize for the Promotion of a Culture of Human Rights. Hessel also received the United Nations Association of Spain Peace Prize Award 2008.

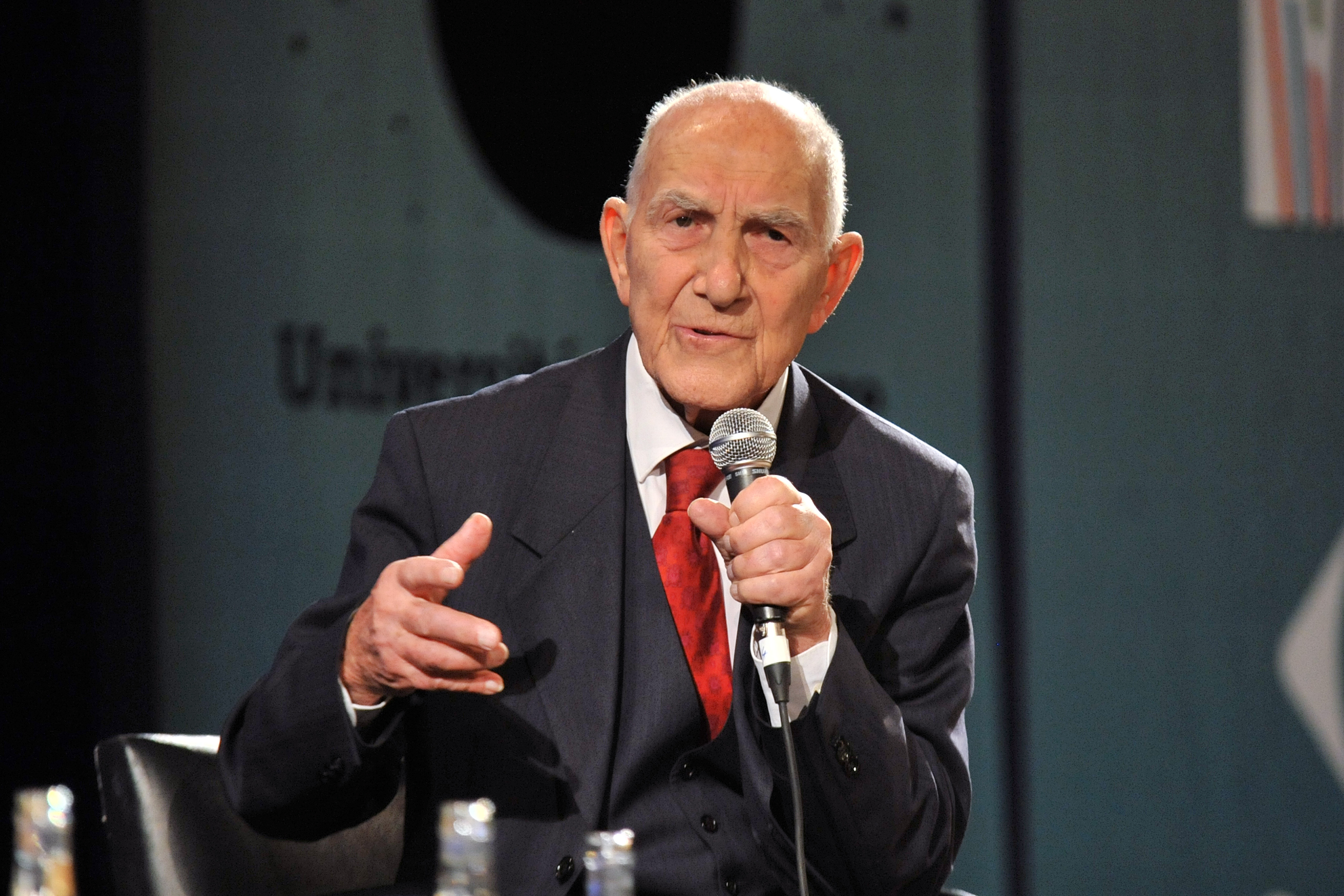
Hessel addressing a UNESCO conference, Paris (2011)

On 5 January 2009, Hessel criticized the Israeli military attacks in the Gaza Strip, saying "In fact, the word that applies—that should be applied—is 'war crime' and even 'crime against humanity'. But this word must be used carefully, especially when one is in Geneva, the seat of the High Commissioner for Human Rights, who may have an important opinion on that issue. For my part, having visited Gaza, having seen the refugee camps with thousands of children, the manner in which they are bombed appears as a veritable crime against humanity."

In 2011, Hessel was named by Foreign Policy magazine to its list of top global thinkers "[f]or bringing the spirit of the French Resistance to a global society that has lost its heart."

== Author ==
=== Time for Outrage! ===
In October 2010, Hessel's essay, Time for Outrage! (original French title: Indignez-vous !), was published in an edition of 6,000 copies (ISBN 978-1455509720). It has sold more than 3.5 million copies worldwide and has been translated into Swedish, Danish, Basque, Catalan, Italian, German, Greek, Portuguese, Slovenian, Spanish, Croatian, Hebrew, Korean Dutch and Hungarian. Translations into Japanese and other languages are planned. In the United States, The Nation magazine's 7–14 March 2011 issue published the entire essay in English.

Hessel's booklet argues that the French need to again become outraged, as were those who participated in the Resistance during World War II. Hessel's reasons for personal outrage include the growing gap between the very rich and the very poor, France's treatment of its illegal immigrants, the need to re-establish a free press, the need to protect the environment, importance of protecting the French welfare system, and the plight of Palestinians, recommending that people read the September 2009 Goldstone Report. He calls for peaceful and non-violent insurrection.

In 2011, one of the names given to the Spanish protests against corruption and bipartisan politics was Los Indignados (The Outraged), derived from the title of the book's translation there (¡Indignaos!). These protests, in conjunction with the Arab Spring, later helped to inspire other protests in many countries, including Greece, UK, Chile, Israel, and Occupy Wall Street which began in New York's financial district, but has now spread across the United States and numerous other countries. Ongoing protests in Mexico challenging corruption, drug cartel violence, economic hardship and policies also have been called the Indignados. Similarly, 2013 protests in Brazil have taken place questioning the government's corruption and its capability of managing public transport, health and education.

=== Engagez-vous ! ===
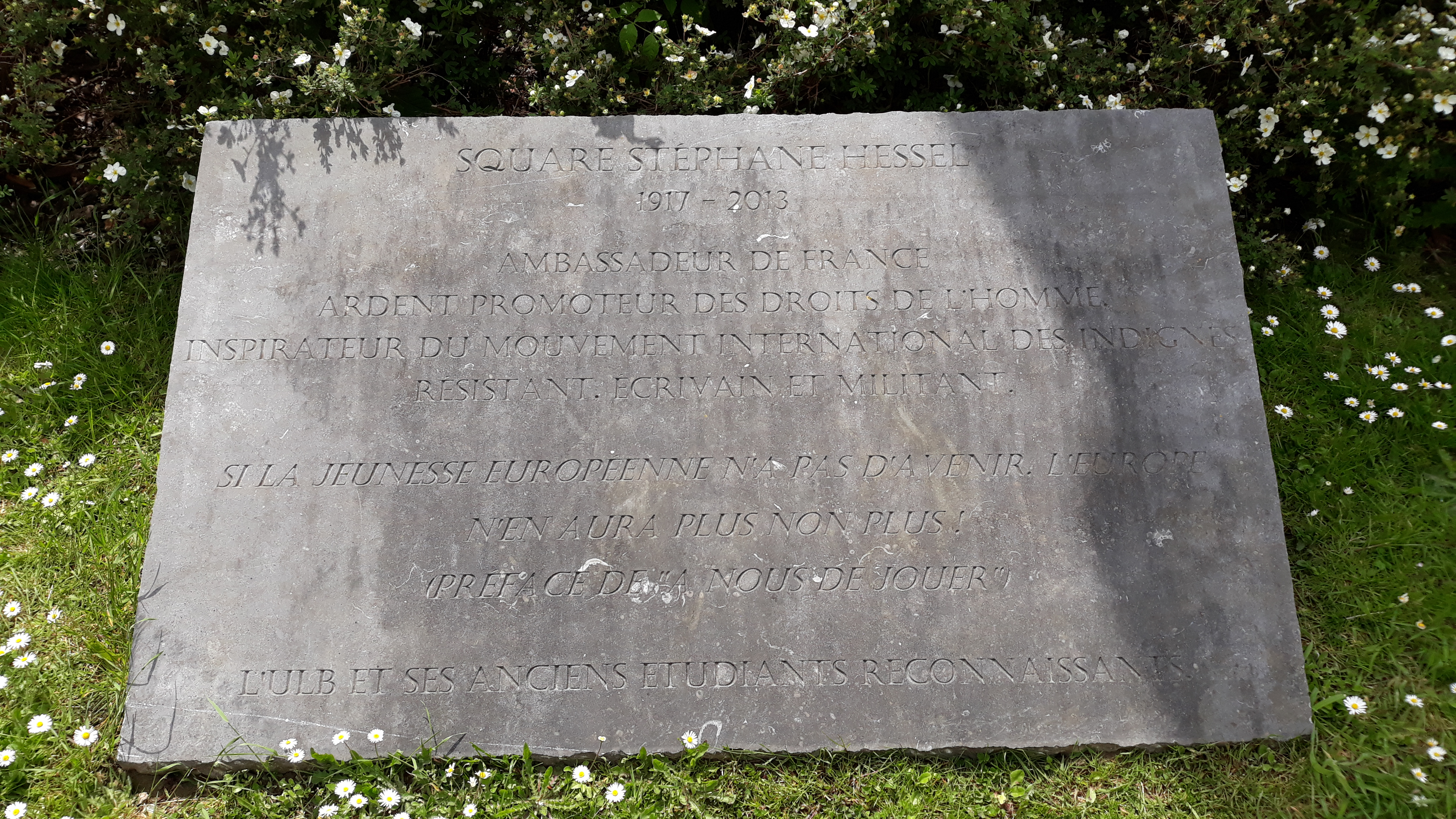
Square Hessel plaque at Brussels university campus.

In 2011, Stéphane Hessel published "Engagez-Vous !" ("Get Involved!"), written with the young French journalist Gilles Vanderpooten. In it "Stephane Hessel appeals to his readers to save the environment and to embrace the positive. He also emphasizes the importance of good luck in life". The book was a success in France and became a bestseller. It was translated into 15 foreign languages, from Europe to Asia and South America.

=== Views of Israel ===
In 2011, Hessel penned an article in the German newspaper Frankfurter Allgemeine Zeitung, in which he compared the Nazi occupation of France during World War II with the occupation of Palestinian Territories by Israeli army in such terms: "the German occupation was, when compared for example with the present occupation of Palestine by the Israelis, a relatively harmless occupation, apart from exceptions like the arrests, detentions and executions, also of the theft of art treasures." Responding to the controversy raised by these remarks, he clarified that he was drawing "no parallel between the horrors of Nazism and the illegal attitude of a state" (Israel); that he naturally supported the existence of Israel but that he wished to be able to criticise the actions of the Israeli authorities without automatically being accused of "antisemitism". He regretted that his words in the Frankfurter Allgemeine Zeitung had been perhaps "written too quickly, and read too quickly".

He told the Ha'aretz newspaper: "Israel must be led differently to ensure its security". Having seen "firsthand the Jews' suffering" as a Holocaust survivor, he clarified that he wished to see Israelis' safety guaranteed by a responsible government. As a supporter of a two state solution, he also told the newspaper: "[A]s long as Palestinian violence exists, but not a Palestinian state, Israel is in danger, because it cannot obtain assistance from the international community against an entity that is not subordinate to international law".

== Death ==
On 26 February 2013, Hessel died overnight at age 95. The following afternoon his name was a top trending term on Twitter in France and Spain. French president Francois Hollande said Hessel's death caused him "great sadness" and remarked "Hessell's capacity for indignation knew no bounds other than those of his own life. As that comes to an end, he leaves us a lesson: to refuse to accept any injustice." UN Human Rights Council chairman Remigiusz Henczel remarked "Mr Hessel was a monumental figure of human rights. His life will continue to inspire our work." French Prime Minister Jean-Marc Ayrault paid tribute to him in the following terms: "In France, in Europe, in the world, Stephane Hessel was the spirit of resistance incarnate. For every generation, for young people, he was a source of inspiration but also a reference. At 95, he embodied faith in the future of this new century." The United Nations Human Rights Council observed a moment of silence in Hessel's memory, which was said to be "unprecedented".

Previously, Hessel had offered his thoughts on death: "Death is something to savour, and I hope to savour mine." His final work, "Don't Give Up: In the Trenches with the Spanish for Liberty and Progress", will be published posthumously. It was originally scheduled to be published in May, but the publisher moved the release date up to mid-March after Hessel's death.

Hessel was survived by his wife Christiane, and three children from a previous marriage.

== Bibliography ==
- Danse avec le siècle, autobiography. Editors Seuil (1997) (in French), 312 pages ISBN 9782020235563 (in French)
- Ô ma mémoire, la poésie, ma nécessité, poems. Seuil (2006, republished 2010) (in French)
- Citoyen du monde, conversations with Jean-Michel Helvig. Fayard (2008) (in French)
- Indignez-vous! essay. Indigène, Montpellier (21 October 2010) 32 pages, ISBN 978-2-911939-76-1 (in French) Published in English as Time for Outrage! by Charles Glass Books, London, 2011, ISBN 0704372223.
- Impegnatevi, Salani Editore, Italy, 2011 (in Italian)
- Engagez-vous !, Entretiens avec Gilles Vanderpooten, Editions de l'Aube, France, 2011 (in French)
- Comprometeos !, Destino, Spain, 2011 (in Spanish)
- Heinz-Norbert Jocks: Der Geist der Empörung. Ein Gespräch mit Stéphane Hessel wenige Monate vor seinem Tod. In: Lettre International. Nr. 100, 2013, S. 13–18.
