= Henri Frenay =

Member of French Resistance

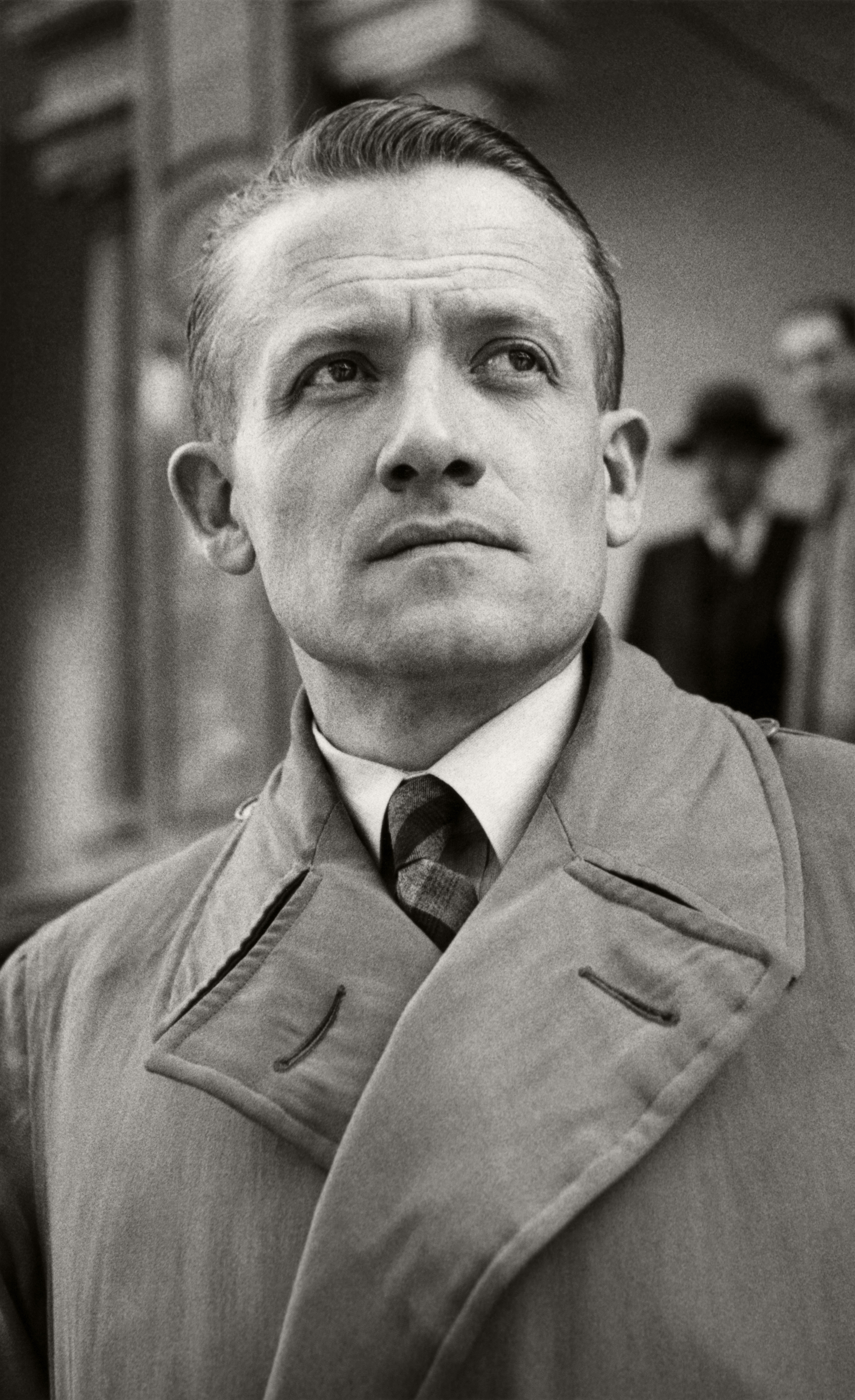
- Born: Henri Auguste Antoine Frenay; 11 November 1905; Lyon, France
- Died: 8 August 1988 (aged 82); Porto-Vecchio, Corsica
- Known for: Resistance to the Nazi occupation of France

Henri Frenay Sandoval (11 November 1905 – 8 August 1988) was a French military officer and French Resistance member, who served as minister of prisoners, refugees and deportees in Charles de Gaulle's Provisional Government of the French Republic.

== Early life and education ==
Henry Frenay was born in Lyon, France, on 11 November 1905, into a Catholic family with a military tradition, and staunch right-wing and anti-communist beliefs. Frenay would later say of his youth, "without knowing, I belonged to a French right-wing, traditionalist, poor, patriotic and paternalistic tradition.” His father was a soldier, who was awarded the Legion of Honour in 1912 and served in the First World War, by the end of which he had reached the rank of lieutenant colonel.

He was educated at the Lycée Ampère in Lyon and later studied Germanic languages at the university of Strasbourg in 1938, writing a dissertation on the German minority in Polish Upper Silesia.

== Military career ==
In 1924, at the age of 19, and having attended a preparatory class at the Lycée du Parc, Frenay enrolled at Saint Cyr, graduating in 1926. In 1933, having served abroad in the army for multiple years in Germany and Syria, he returned to France, specifically to Hyères in south-east France, where he was assigned to the 3rd Alpine Infantry Brigade. He reached the rank of captain in 1934 and studied at the École Supérieure de Guerre in 1935.

At the outbreak of World War II, Frenay rejoined the French army and was assigned to the Maginot Line as a staff officer. On 13 June 1940, the 43rd Army Corps, to which he was deployed at the time, was ordered to retreat, and Frenay was taken prisoner by the German army four days later in Vosges. He managed to escape from a POW camp in Alsace on 27 June 1940, and reached the Zone libre on 15 July, heading to Marseille, where he quickly became aware of the severity of France's situation.

== Resistance ==
Having been warned of the Nazi ideological plans very early on through meetings organised by Berty Albrecht, and convinced that France would recover from its defeat, Frenay set out in August 1940 to gather the beginnings of a network around himself and Albrecht. This network, the Mouvement de Libération Nationale (MLN), was the first historical movement of internal resistance in France. Originally, the resistance's goal was not to fight the Vichy Regime. Frenay, a military man, saw Pétain as a former Marshal who had led France during the Great War and was consequently willing to give him the benefit of the doubt, hoping that he was playing a double game, preparing for the salvation of France in one way or another.

As a Resistance member, Frenay also became an editor of underground newspapers such as Vérités (Truths).

In July 1941, Frenay met with former Prefect Jean Moulin, who had been dismissed by the Vichy Regime in November 1940 due to his Radical, republican ideals and sought to find out the size of the internal resistance movements in France on the orders of General de Gaulle. Frenay, trusting de Gaulle, trained Moulin and introduced him to the Resistance. In November 1941, Frenay had a hand in the formation of the Combat group.

In January 1942, Frenay met with Moulin again following the latter's return from London, where he had been charged with unifying the French Resistance and rallying it to de Gaulle. He continued to meet with Moulin frequently until 1943, though the two often disagreed on many matters, with Frenay believing that Moulin favoured pro-Soviet movements over his own, though in reality Moulin had been tasked by de Gaulle to separate the political conflict from the military resistance, with the belief that Free France, the French government in exile in London and later in Algiers, should carry out the political function under his leadership. Frenay, on the other hand, believed that the Resistance should be its own, autonomous political movement that created new post-war institutions and did not simply welcome back the old parties and associated networks, citing the failure of the party system under the Third Republic.

In February 1942, to obtain the release of militants from the Zone Libre, Frenay twice met with Henri Rollin, head of the Direction de la surveillance du territoire, then the Minister of the Interior of Vichy France, Pierre Pucheu, who suggested that Frenay should connect his movements to the French secret services, a suggestion which Frenay rejected. During a third meeting with Rollin and members of Pucheu's cabinet, Frenay stormed down. Nevertheless, these meetings led to the release of several Resistance fighters.

In the Zone Libre, Frenay sought to take military control of the French Resistance, when the three largest movements in the Zone (Francs-Tireurs et Partisans, Libération-sud and Combat) merged, which led to discussions with de Gaulle and Moulin, subsequently leading to the forming of the Conseil National de la Résistance, which, despite his leading involvement, Frenay distrusted and generally kept his own group, Combat, as separate from as possible.

When the Gestapo captured Moulin in June 1943, Frenay fled to Algiers. In November 1943, he met Charles de Gaulle, who appointed him as a minister of prisoners, refugees and deportees. Frenay, due to his major role in the internal Resistance, had desired a more important role in the Ministry of the Interior, but the differences of opinion between him and de Gaulle led to Frenay obtaining this lower ranking position.

== Post war ==
After the war, Frenay retained his role as minister of prisoner, refugees and deportees until 21 October 1945, during which time he helped organise the return of 1,330,000 prisoners, refugees and deportees from the Allied Zone to France and their reintegration back into national life.

Frenay was a passionate supporter of the post-war moves to European unity. He took part with Marceau Pivert in the founding in February 1947 of the Committee for the United Socialist States of Europe. This committee, linked to the SFIO, collaborated with the Union of European Federalists but did not take part in the Hague Congress which created the European Movement in 1948. He became President of the Central Committee of the UEF in November 1948, as well as President of its Executive Committee from 1950. He resigned his presidency in 1954, after the rejection by France of the European Defense Community (EDC). It was at this time that he definitively broke with General de Gaulle over the latter's opposition to European integration. Frenay retired from political life and became a businessman. He published his autobiography, The Night Will End: Memoirs of a Revolutionary in 1976, which notably criticised Moulin and de Gaulle as reckless.

== Personal life ==
In 1934, Frenay met and fell in love with Berty Albrecht, a Protestant feminist and anti-fascist, twelve years his senior and married, albeit separated from her husband. Through her, he met German, anti-Nazi refugees and came to be interested in Nazism, consequently discovering the threat it posed through reading Mein Kampf. Their relationship continued until 1942, during which time they worked together on the underground newspapers. Albrecht was eventually captured by SS Officer Klaus Barbie in 1943, in a trap likely intended to draw out Frenay, and became a martyr of the resistance, committing suicide to avoid revealing information under torture.

In 1942, Frenay met Chilina Ciosi (1909–1997), head doctor of a clinic in Font-Romeu and head of a Resistance transit route to Spain. She gave birth to a child on 6 October 1943. To avoid endangering the mother and child, their son was declared "of unknown father and mother" and placed in a nursery until the end of the conflict. Frenay and Ciosi married after the war, on 25 November 1946.

Frenay died at Porto-Vecchio, Corsica, on 8 August 1988. Then-President, and former resistant, François Mitterrand issued a eulogy following Frenay's death, and across France streets have been named after him, including a square in Paris in the 12th arrondissement.

== See also ==
- Eugène Pons

== Sources ==
- Argyle, Ray (2014), The Paris Game: Charles de Gaulle, the Liberation of Paris, and the Gamble that Won France, Dundurn, ISBN 978-1-4597-2287-3
- Frenay, Henri (2006), La nuit finira: Mémoires de résistance 1940-1945, Editions Michalon, ISBN 978-2841863501
- Westerfield, Lillian Leigh (2004), 'This Anguish, Like a Kind of Intimate Song': Resistance in Women's Literature of World War II, Rodopi, ISBN 90-420-1148-3
