= Augustin Malroux =

French politician (1900–1945)

Augustin Malroux

Augustin Malroux (5 April 1900 – 10 April 1945) was a French socialist politician and member of the French Resistance, a teacher by profession.

== Political ascent ==
Born in Blaye-les-Mines, Tarn, as the son of a miner and a laundress, Augustin Malroux studied at the École normale for teachers at Toulouse. After his military service, from 1920 to 1922, he was assigned to Provence, then being sent to teach in Tarn département in 1927, with his wife, herself a teacher.

Although the precise date of his entrance in the Section française de l'Internationale ouvrière (SFIO, French Section of the Second International) remains unknown, he founded the socialist section of Lafenasse and became its secretary. He took part in all the congresses of his federation, as well as at the national congress at Paris, in July 1933, where he supported Léon Blum and opposed Adrien Marquet. On 4 February 1934, he became secretary of the Tarn socialist federation. In this capacity, he took a firm stand against the neo-socialists.

In 1935, he was elected mayor of his native commune. The following year, he became a deputy in the National Assembly of France and a member of the Permanent Administrative Commission, at the time the decision-making organ of the SFIO. He made several visits to the départements of Aveyron, Haute-Garonne and Hérault, also visiting the French Algeria département of Oran, in April 1937, to support local socialists. His trip to Algeria was sharply criticised by certain newspapers, as he manifested his anti-colonialism.

In December 1938, he presented an amendment to exempt wheat headed to the Spanish Republic from export duties. In February 1940, he denounced the partiality of the censors – who permitted the publication of explicit appeals to murder Léon Blum – and outrages committed against the principle of laïcité. He was thus attacked by certain deputies of the right and of the extreme right, notably Philippe Henriot.

== Hero and martyr of the Resistance ==
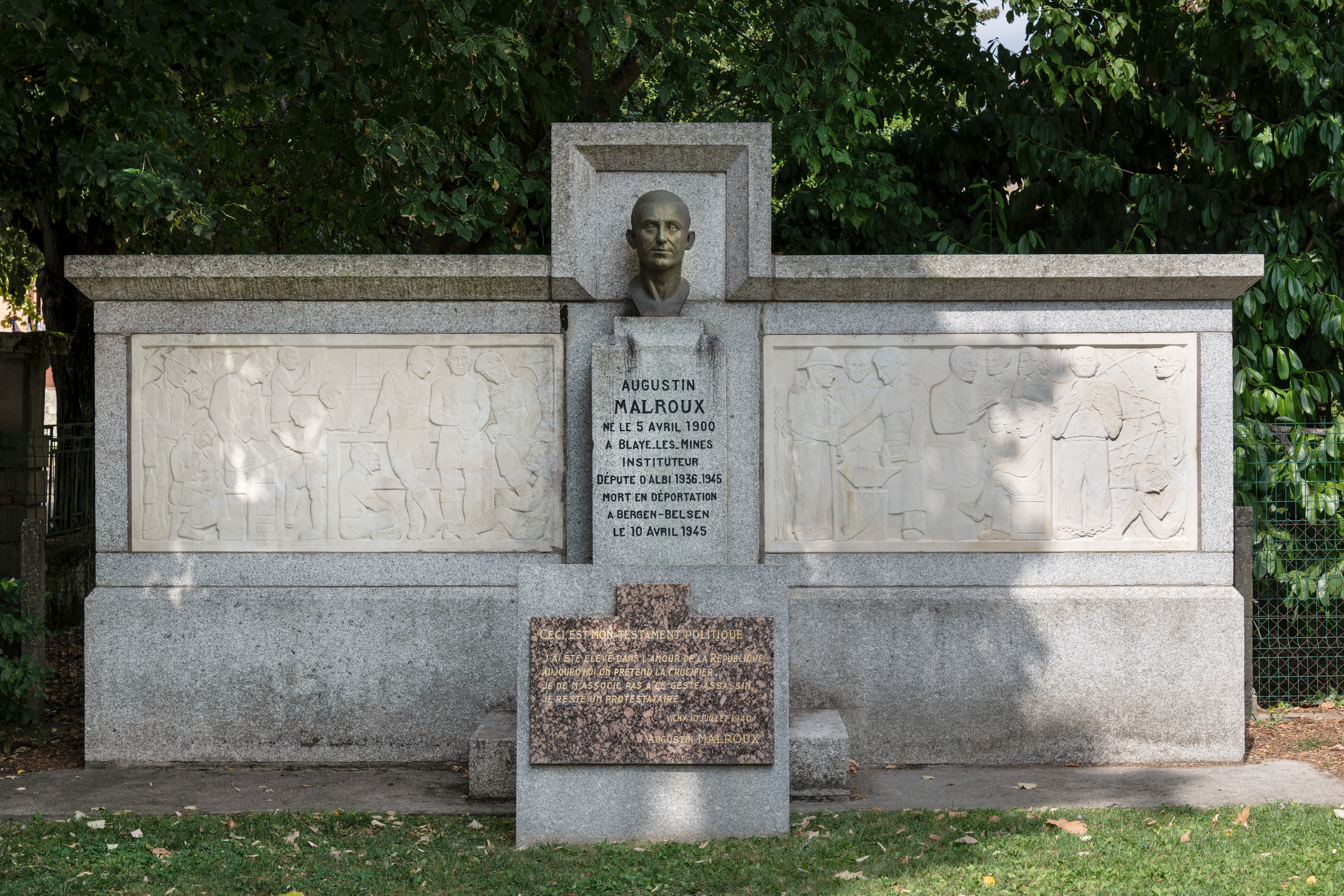
Monument to Augustin Malroux in Albi

On 10 July 1940, he was one of the parliamentarians voting not to grant full powers to Marshal Pétain. He wrote to his wife and children: "I was raised with a love of the Republic. Today, they intend to crucify her. I do not associate myself with this assassin's gesture." Having returned to the Tarn département, he secretly put back together the socialist federation. In September 1940, he participated in the founding of the Comité d'action socialiste (CAS, Socialist Action Committee) for the zone occupée, offered his Parisian residence for clandestine meetings, and then assured the link between CAS Nord and CAS Sud (Southern Zone), the latter founded by Daniel Mayer. In May, and then in December 1941, he participated in the meetings of CAS Sud. He worked actively with Suzanne Buisson and Edouard Froment. From 1941, he was a member of the Confrérie Notre-Dame (Notre-Dame Brotherhood) and of the Organisation civile et militaire (Civil and Military Organisation).

With equal vigour, Augustin Malroux made efforts to maintain contact with those Socialist deputies who had been interned or imprisoned. One man whom he kept abreast of his activities was Louis Noguères, another SFIO deputy who had voted against granting full powers and was placed under house arrest for this by the Vichy regime.

From 1940, he was also charged with establishing a link between Libération-sud and Libération-Nord. In 1942, this movement asked him to create a combat group. Finally, he participated in the clandestine rebuilding of the Syndicat national des instituteurs (National Teachers' Union).

Arrested on 2 March 1942 in Paris, Augustin Malroux was then imprisoned in Fresnes. On 15 September 1943, he was deported to Germany. First imprisoned in the camp at Neunkirchen, he was then transferred to prisons at Frankfurt am Main, Kassel, Halle and Berlin in September–October 1943, then to the camp at Bad Saarow, from October 1943 to February 1945, and finally to the camp at Bergen-Belsen, where he died.

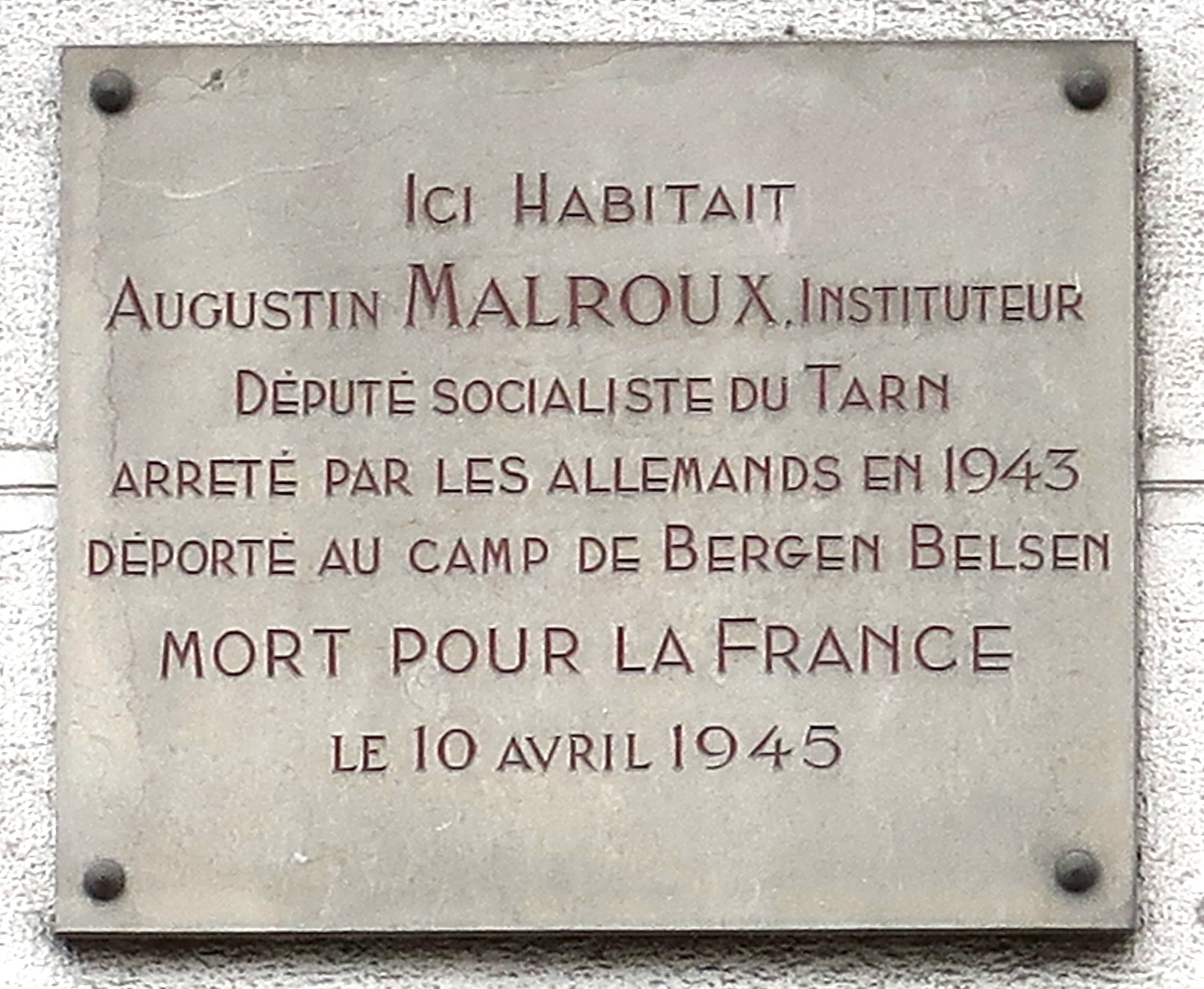
Memorial plate for Augustin Malroux, 2 rue Petel, Paris

News of his death only emerged several months later. The Tarn SFIO had placed him at the head of their list for the municipal elections in Carmaux in May 1945.

== Tributes ==
In April 1946, a plaque was engraved in front of his Paris house. Robert Verdier delivered a speech on this occasion. A monument was then unveiled at Albi in the presence of Jean Biondi.

Streets in several towns of Tarn département bear his name, as does the collège of Blaye-les-Mines, opened in 1990 by Lionel Jospin, then Minister of National Education.

== Sources ==
- Jean Maitron (head), The Biographical Dictionary of the French Workers' Movement, CD-ROM, l'Atelier, 1997
- Louis Mexandeau, Histoire du Parti socialiste (1905-2005) (History of the Socialist Party (1905-2005)), Tallandier, 2005
