= Socialist Action Committee =

French Resistance movement

- Comité d'action socialiste
- Abbreviation: CAS
- Successor: Clandestine SFIO
- Formation: March 1941
- Founders: Daniel Mayer, Suzanne Buisson
- Dissolved: March 1943
- Purpose: Organizing socialist resistance, reconstituting the French Section of the Workers' International (SFIO)
- Region served: France
- Affiliations: French Resistance, SFIO

The Socialist Action Committee (CAS) was a French Resistance movement founded in March 1941 by Daniel Mayer and Suzanne Buisson under the guidance of Léon Blum. Its purpose was to reorganize the underground French Section of the Workers' International (SFIO) and coordinate socialist resistance against the German occupation and the Vichy regime.

The movement ceased to exist in March 1943, when it was replaced by the clandestine SFIO.

== Formation of the CAS (1940-1941) ==
=== The Call to Resist ===
Following the collapse of France in the summer of 1940, and up until his arrest on September 15, Léon Blum urged SFIO leaders to resist the occupation. Blum insisted on continuing political action within France. To Daniel Mayer and his wife Cletta, who considered leaving for London, he said: "You will be just two more mouths to feed there and have no military expertise. There is work to be done here. We must continue the war, rebuild the Party, and lead the fight against the occupiers and Vichy. You will be more useful here."

=== The First Signs of Socialist Resistance ===
During autumn 1940, scattered acts of individual resistance began to appear. Groups gradually formed in response to the occupation.

==== In the Occupied Zone ====
A socialist activist, Jean Texcier, wrote and circulated "Advice to the Occupied" as early as September 1940. Initially a clandestine publication, Libération-Nord emerged as a structured resistance movement in December 1940, advocating for non-communist CGT unions, CFTC, and the underground SFIO, under the leadership of Christian Pineau and the team behind the "Manifesto of the Twelve." Although not exclusively socialist, the SFIO held significant influence within the movement.

Stripped of his office by the Vichy regime, Jean-Baptiste Lebas, SFIO deputy-mayor of Roubaix, called for resistance as early as August 1940 through a pamphlet titled "Socialism Continues!" By late summer, he founded one of the first Resistance networks in occupied France, "L'Homme libre" ("The Free Man"), which also published an underground newspaper of the same name. Around 300 socialist militants immediately joined the movement. "L'Homme libre" declared in October 1940, "It is not a question of reconstituting the Socialist Party, as the Socialist Party has never been dissolved."

By January 1941, "L'Homme libre" expanded its circulation to Lille and Douai. That same month, Jean-Baptiste Lebas established a Socialist Action Committee (CAS) to coordinate socialist resistance efforts. This committee later merged with the CAS for the entire northern zone, originally founded in September 1940.

==== In the Free Zone ====
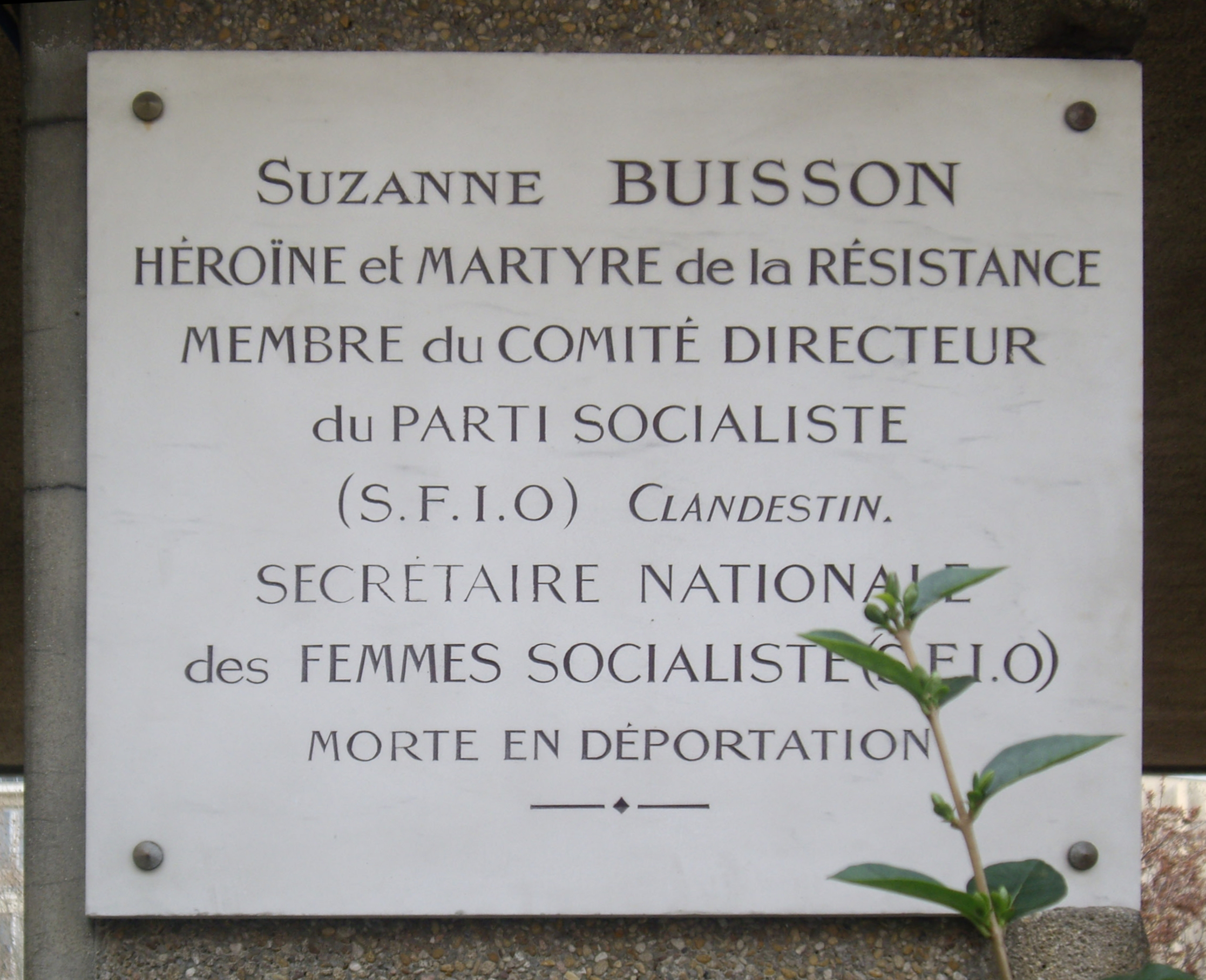
Memorial plaque for Suzanne Buisson, co-founder of the Socialist Action Committee, who died in deportation.

The southern CAS was founded on March 30, 1941, in Nîmes by among others Daniel Mayer, his wife Cletta, Félix Gouin and Suzanne Buisson.

== Structure and Activities (1941-1942) ==
During 1941 and 1942, the CAS gradually expanded, attracting a growing number of militants. However, unlike the French Communist Party (PCF), the CAS did not integrate party reconstruction with Resistance network-building. Consequently, except for Libération-Nord, where socialists dominated, the CAS lacked strong organizational footholds. Nevertheless, socialist militants played a key role in Libération-Sud, Combat, Ceux de la Résistance, the Brutus network, and the Organisation civile et militaire (OCM), particularly in Pas-de-Calais under Guy Mollet.

On May 15, 1942, the CAS launched the underground newspaper Le Populaire.

== Transition to the Clandestine SFIO (1943) ==
In March 1943, the CAS officially became the clandestine SFIO. Le Populaire declared: "The Socialist Action Committee is no more. The Socialist Party continues its mission. [...] To reaffirm the continuity of our doctrine, the Socialist Party reclaims its flag intact. New methods, new modes of action, new tones in its propaganda, but the same doctrine—confirmed and even rejuvenated by recent events."

Shortly after, at a secret meeting in Paris on June 17-18, the northern CAS integrated into the clandestine SFIO.

By early 1944, the clandestine SFIO had approximately 50,000 members, though the actual number of socialist militants engaged in the Resistance was likely higher due to the difficulties of clandestine activities.

== Notable Members of the Socialist Action Committee ==
- Jean-Fernand Audeguil
- Camille Bedin
- Jean Biondi
- Élie Bloncourt
- Suzanne Buisson (died in deportation)
- Félix Gouin
- Jean-Baptiste Lebas (died in deportation)
- Daniel Mayer
- André Philip
- Jean Pierre-Bloch
- Christian Pineau (Companion of the Liberation)
- Pierre Viénot (Companion of the Liberation)
