= Élie Bloncourt =

French politician (1896–1978)

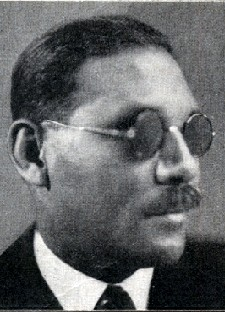
Bloncourt Elie.jpg

Élie Bloncourt (5 May 1896 – 4 March 1978) was a French politician who represented the department of Aisne in the French National Assembly from 1936 to 1946. He was blinded by a shrapnel blast in the First World War and was part of the French resistance movement in World War II. He had a degree in philosophy and worked as a high school teacher, while also being involved in organizational works relating to veterans' affairs, pacifism and politics.

== Early life and World War I ==
Bloncourt was born in Basse-Terre, Guadeloupe into a political family. Melvil-Bloncourt, who was then deceased, was his great-uncle. His father had been a higher functionary but died before Élie was born, leaving his mother to raise Élie and five other siblings. With the help of a grant Élie attended Lycée Carnot in Pointe-à-Pitre, obtaining a baccalauréat in 1913.

Family circumstances, including the death of his mother, kept him from seeking higher education in France, but in 1915 he was mobilized by the French military. After initial training in Bordeaux he was sent to the Dardanelles and the Macedonian front. From September to November 1917, he was back in Guadeloupe, but returned to France and was stationed in Meuse. In May 1918 his division entered the zone around Château-Thierry. During a heavy German attack on 30 May, Bloncourt was hit by a machine gun bullet which destroyed both his eyeballs and left him permanently blinded. He was taken prisoner by the Germans and sent to a camp in Parchim in Mecklenburg.

== Inter-war period and start of political career ==
After the end of the war, he returned to France in January 1919. He stayed for some months in hospital and later learned braille and touch typing in a special school. In autumn 1919 he started studying philosophy at the University of Paris and obtained a bachelor's degree in 1921. He sought jobs as teacher in secondary schools, but only managed to get temporary positions leaving him to rely on his invalidity pension.

He got involved in several organizations for war victims and was at various times part of the leadership in Union des aveugles de guerre, Association des anciens combattants de la Guadeloupe and Office national des combattants, mutilés, victimes de la guerre et pupilles de la nation. He also became involved in international pacifist work among World War I veterans and attended several conferences.

In 1932 he got a teacher position at a school in La Fère, Aisne.

In Aisne, Bloncourt got involved in local politics. He was elected to the general council for the French Section of the Workers' International (SFIO) in 1934 and reelected in 1936. In April 1936, he was elected to the National Assembly for the Popular Front. He was the first black député for a constituency inside the Metropolitan France (1936–1940, 1945–1947), and first black conseiller général of the métropole.

In the Parliament, Bloncourt in particular worked with issues regarding war veterans and military pensions. He was also member of commissions regarding Algeria and French colonies. While he had previously opposed any, he supported the first ministry of Léon Blum which was formed in 1936 and lasted to 1937.

Bloncourt was in the 1930s preoccupied with the danger of fascism and advocated a unified anti-fascist front of Socialist and Communists. He also wanted a unified front among non-fascist countries and approved the Franco-Soviet Treaty of Mutual Assistance in May 1935. His insistence on the need of defense against fascism put him at odds with some former friends in the pacifist movement.

== World War II ==
When World War II started, Bloncourt immediately took a strong stand against any cooperation with the Germans and did not attend the Parliament's gathering in Vichy on 10 July 1940. Among with other members of S.F.I.O. he organized the underground Socialist Party in the occupied zone and became the organization's leader. He became responsible for organizing the Libération-Nord in Aisne where he participated in the Brutus Network which spied on and registered the movements of the occupying forces.

As a member of the Comité ministériel pour les colonies of the National Council of the Resistance (CNR), he took part in the reoccupation of the building for the Ministry of the Colonies in Paris on 25 August 1944. On 30 August he took control over the prefecture of Laon of behalf of the CNR and there installed a committee for liberation of the department.

== Post-World War II ==
In October 1945, Bloncourt and his friend Jean Pierre-Bloch topped the S.F.I.O. list in the Aisne in the election to the National Assembly and both were elected.

A supporter of unity between parties on the left, Bloncourt became increasingly in opposition to the political direction of the SFIO. He lost his place in the executive board of the party in 1946 and also lost his place in parliament the same year; as the local party preferred another candidate for the second constituting parliament. He went on to reestablish and the Bataille socialiste fraction of the SFIO in 1947, turned it into a new political party Mouvement socialiste unitaire et démocratique and was eventually excluded from the SFIO in 1948.

After his parliamentary career ended, Bloncourt settled in Paris and worked as teacher at the Lycée Charlemagne and at the Centre national d'enseignement par correspondence. He retired in 1960. He continued to be involved in politics through minor political parties and other engagements. In 1960 he started the Comité d’aide aux victimes de la répression to support those who opposed the French war in Algeria. On 22 June 1968, he was one of 29 signers of a letter in Le Monde which condemned as undemocratic certain measures by the De Gaulle government.

== Personal life ==
After World War I, Bloncourt's wife and a son who lived in Guadeloupe joined him in metropolitan France. His brother Max Clainville-Bloncourt was an advocate in Paris. Another brother, Yves Clainville Bloncourt, participated in World War I where he was wounded and later settled in Haiti. Yves Clainville's son, Tony Bloncourt, was part of the French Communist resistance movement during World War II and executed by the Germans in 1942. Tony's brother is painter and photographer Gérald Bloncourt.

== Awards ==
- Commander of the Legion of Honour (au titre militaire)
