= Jean-Fernand Audeguil =

French politician (1887–1956)

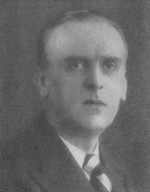
- Fernand Audeguil in 1946

Chamber of Deputies of France (Third and Fourth Republics)

Member of Parliament for Gironde
- In office 1936–1941
- In office 1944–1951

Mayor of Bordeaux
- In office August 1944 – 19 October 1947
- Preceded by: Adrien Marquet
- Succeeded by: Jacques Chaban-Delmas

Personal details
- Born: 5 January 1887 Monclar-d'Agenais (Lot-et-Garonne)
- Died: 23 November 1956 (aged 69) Bordeaux, France
- Party: SFIO
- Education: University of Bordeaux
- Profession: Teacher

Jean-Fernand Audeguil (5 January 1887 – 23 November 1956) was a French professor, a member of the resistance and a politician.

== Early life and education ==
Born in Monclar in the department of Lot-et-Garonne, Audeguil studied at the University of Bordeaux and later taught in Bordeaux.

== Political career ==
He joined the French Section of the Workers' International (SFIO) and was elected to the town council in Talence in 1935. He stood as an SFIO candidate in the 1936 elections to Chamber of Deputies and was elected to represent Bordeaux.

In July 1940, Audeguil was on the 80 members of the French assembly who voted against granting special powers to Marshal Philippe Pétain. As a consequence, he was dismissed from his teaching post by Pétain's Vichy régime.

In 1941 he joined the Libération-Nord movement of the French Resistance and was a member of the Comité d'action socialiste, the clandestine form of the then-banned SFIO. Following the defeat of German forces in France following the Allied landings in Normandy and Provence, Bordeaux was liberated by the French Forces of the Interior and Audeguil was appointed by the Provisional Government of the French Republic to act as mayor of the city. He was also appointed to represent Bordeaux in the National Assembly, the replacement for the old Chamber of Deputies. He was confirmed in both posts by elections in 1944 and 1945 respectively. His election as mayor was the first where women have the right of vote in Bordeaux.

Audeguil was defeated in the 1947 mayoral election in Bordeaux by Gaullist Jacques Chaban-Delmas. He continued to represent Bordeaux in the National Assembly until 1951 when he gave up his seat due to ill health. He retired from politics in January 1956 and died later that year in Bordeaux.
