= Caroline Rémy de Guebhard =

French anarchist, journalist and feminist (1855-1929)

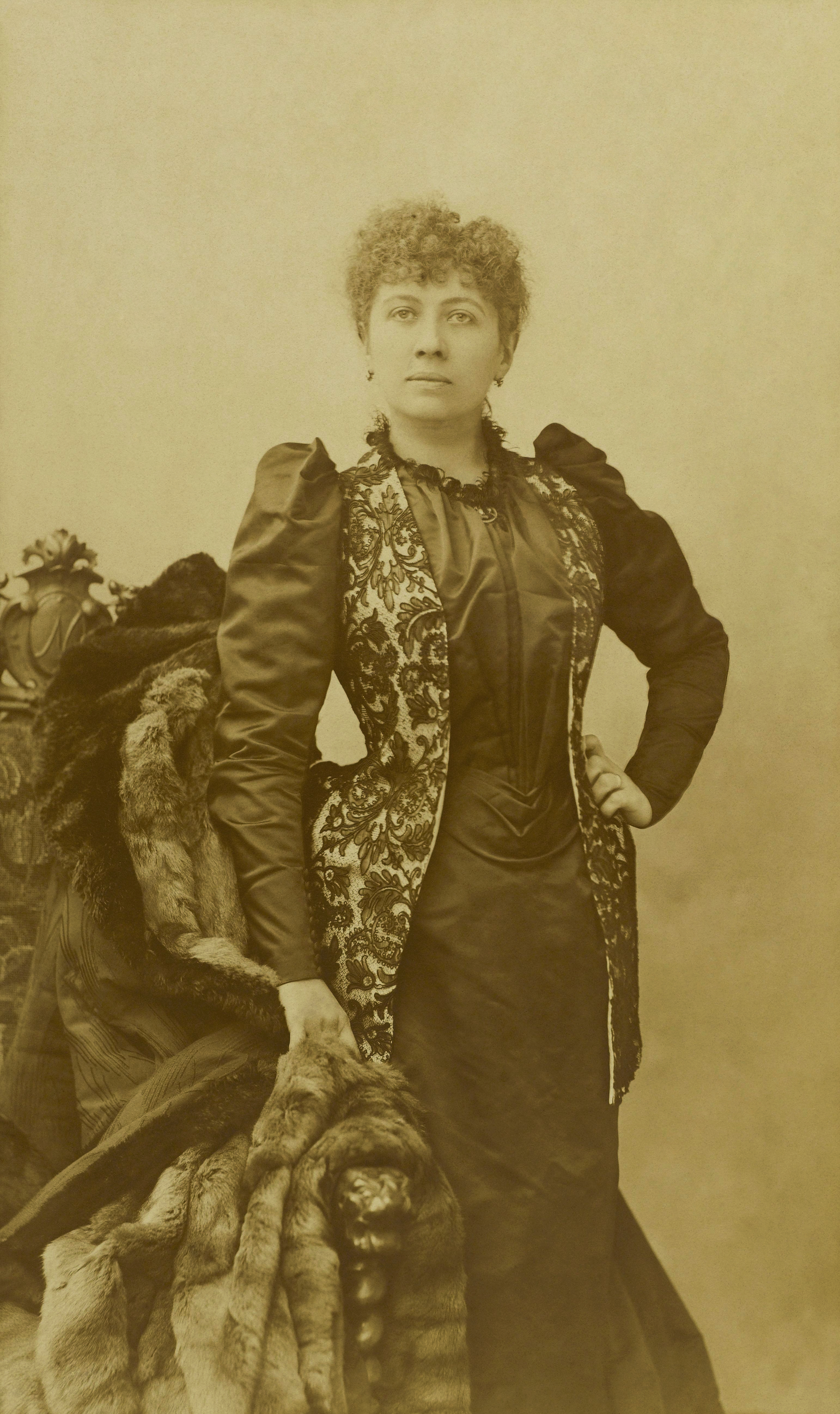
- Carte-de-visite of Séverine by Nadar
- Born: 27 April 1855; Paris, France
- Died: 24 April 1929 (aged 73); Pierrefonds, France
- Other name: Séverine
- Occupations: Anarchist, Journalist, Feminist
- Movement: Feminism, Anarchism, Populism
- Spouses: Antoine-Henri Montrobert (m. 1871; div. 1885) Adrien Guebhard (m. 1885; died 1924)

Signature
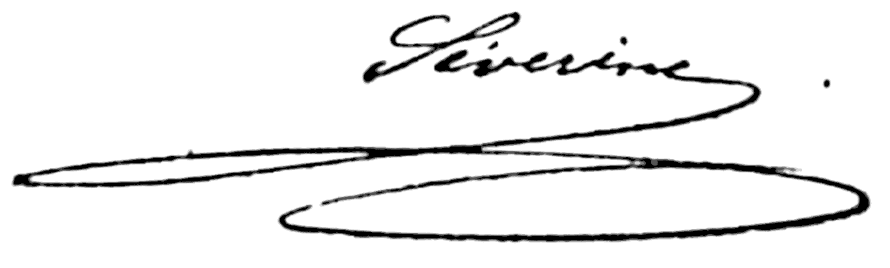

Caroline Rémy de Guebhard (27 April 1855 – 24 April 1929) was a French journalist with anarchist, socialist, communist and feminist views, best known under the pen name Séverine. She has been called the first professional female journalist in France.

== Biography ==
Around 1880, Caroline Rémy became involved with Jules Vallès' socialist publication, Cri du Peuple. Vallès eventually gave her control over the newspaper due to his poor health. Becoming increasingly militant, she befriended journalist and feminist Marguerite Durand but, following a confrontation with the Marxist Jules Guesde, left the newspaper in 1888.

In December 1891, she was invited by Pierre Martinet—later a theorist of individualist anarchism—to attend one of his 'soup lectures' at Salle Favier. These events aimed to provide food and anarchist newspapers to attendees before delivering anarchist speeches to them.

She continued writing for other papers in which she promoted women's emancipation and denounced social injustices, including the Dreyfus affair. In 1897, she began writing for Durand's feminist daily newspaper La Fronde.

A staunch leftist, Rémy backed a number of anarchist causes, including the defense of Germaine Berton, and participated in the 1927 efforts to save Sacco and Vanzetti. She supported the Russian Revolution of 1917 and, in 1921, joined the French Communist Party, resigning a few years later in order to maintain her membership of the Human Rights League.

Bernard Lecache, a founding member of the Committee of Honor of International League Against Anti-Semitism (LICA), (now International League Against Racism and Anti-Semitism (LICRA)), wrote her biography. Her portrait was painted by Pierre-Auguste Renoir in 1885 and now hangs in the National Gallery of Art in Washington, DC.

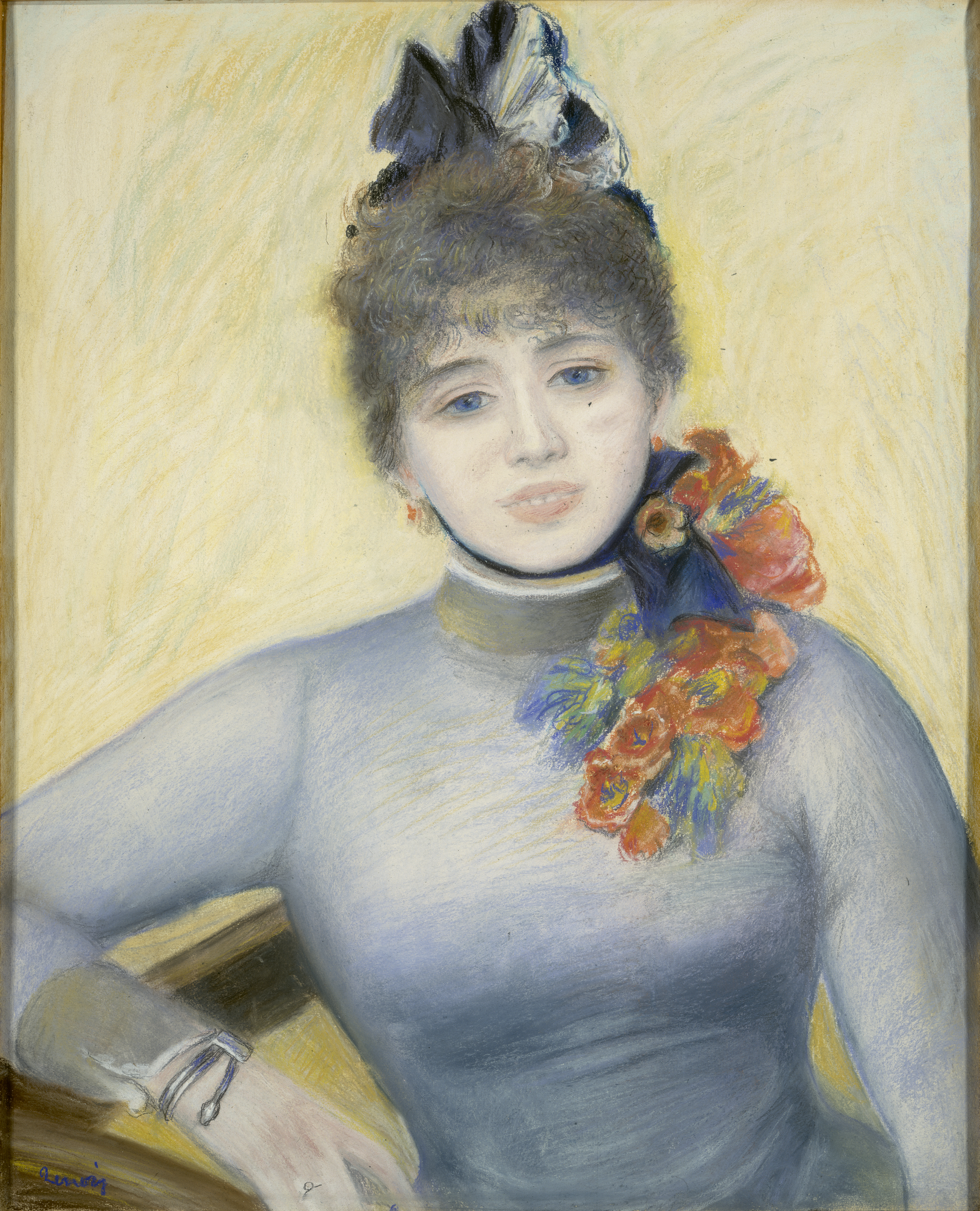
Caroline Rémy, portrait by Pierre-Auguste Renoir

Caroline Rémy died in 1929 at her home in Pierrefonds, Oise department in the Picardy region of France. Some of her papers can be found in the Bibliothèque Marguerite Durand in Paris.

Shortly before her death, she took part in the campaign to support the candidacy of Dr. Albert Besson, who was elected councilor of the district Saint-Fargeau, general counselor of the Seine then deputy chairman of the Council of Paris and the general council of the Seine. In 1933, in her memory, he had the Paris council vote for the attribution of the name "Séverine" to the square created at his initiative Porte de Bagnolet (Paris 20).

She was nominated for the Nobel Peace Prize in 1920, 1922, 1924, 1927 and 1929 by Lucien Le Foyer.

== Gallery ==
Séverine

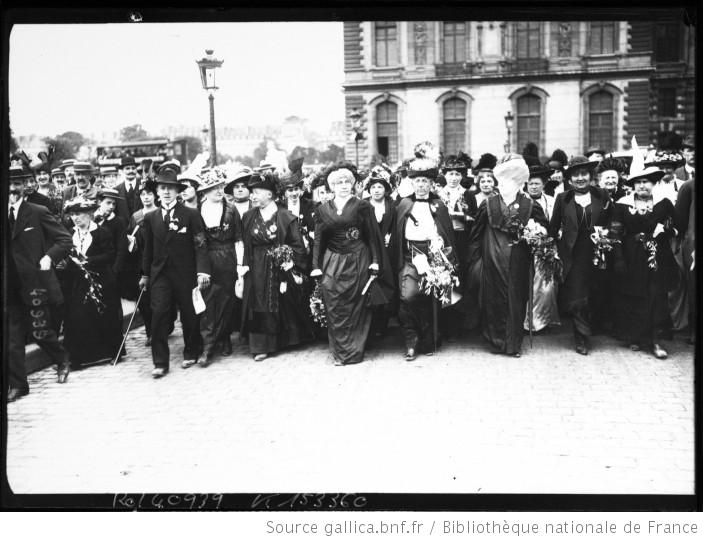

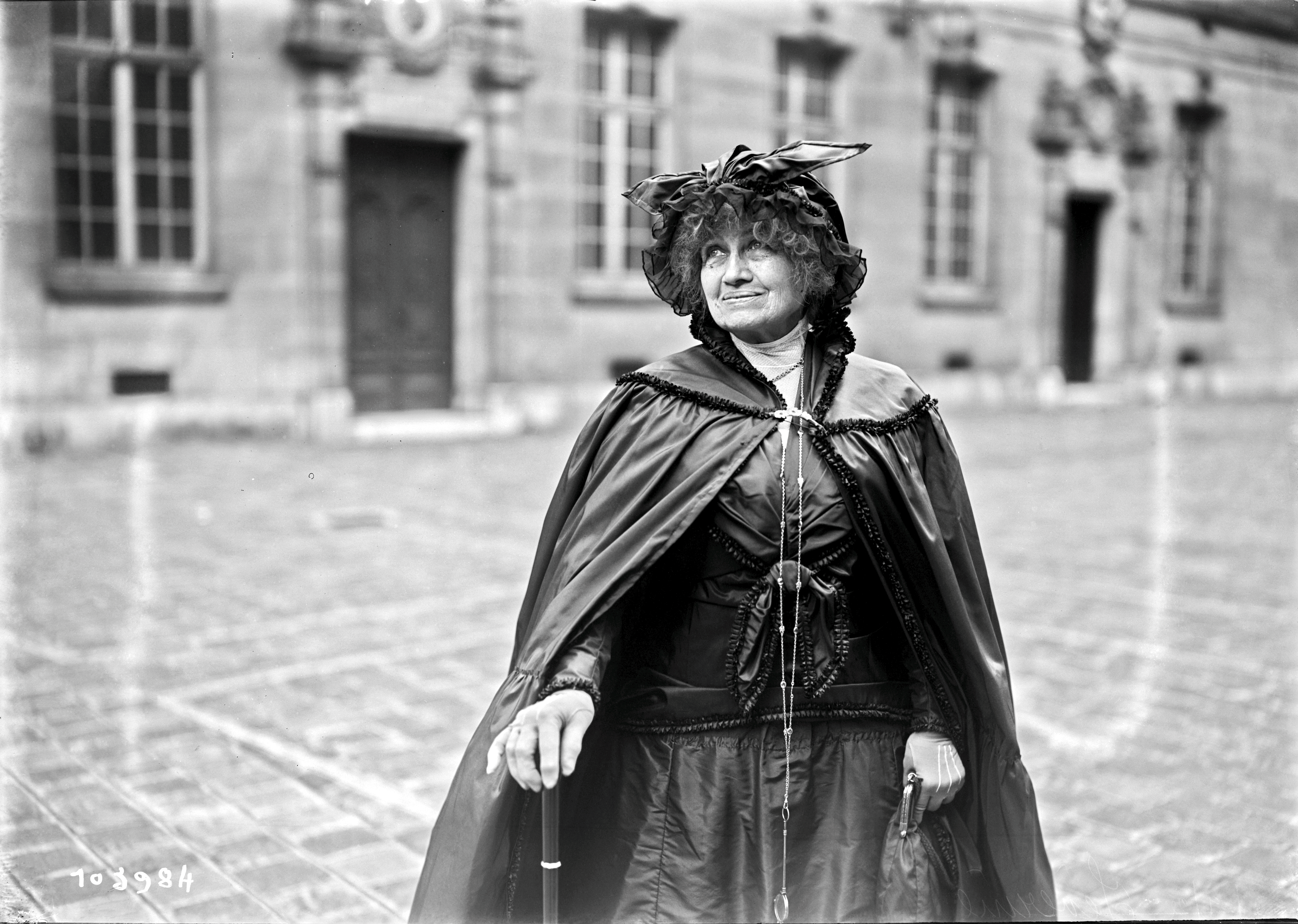

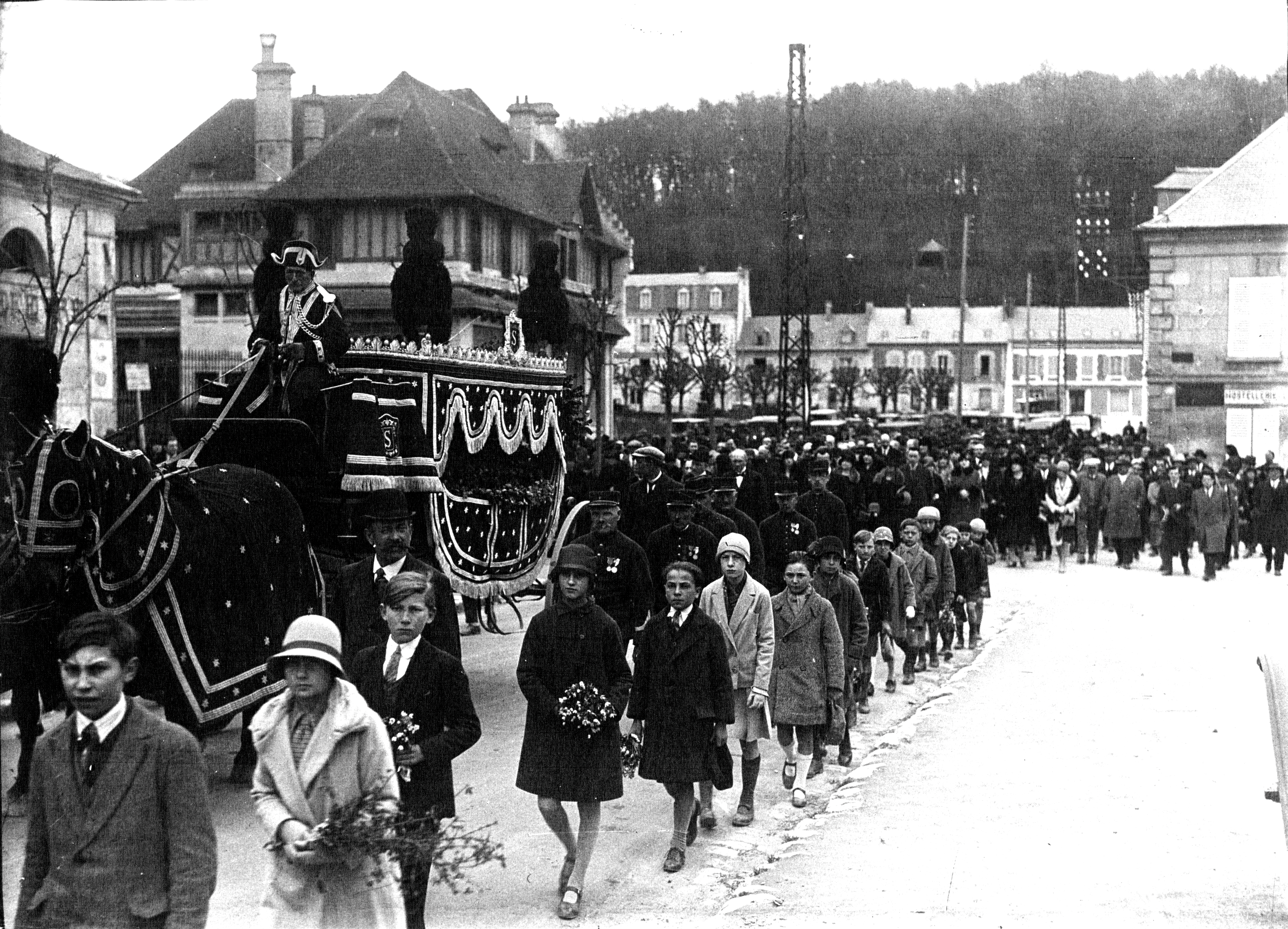

== See also ==
- Anarchism in France
- Women in journalism
