= Brutus Network =

French Resistance movement of World War II

The Brutus Network (French: Réseau Brutus) was a French Resistance movement during World War II. It was founded in 1941 by Pierre Fourcaud, parachuted in France with instructions from Charles de Gaulle to set up an intelligence network, and other socialist members of the French Section of the Workers' International (SFIO), from the Bouches-du-Rhône department in the Southern Zone, and led by Félix Gouin. As soon as July 1941, the network almost became the armed wing of the Comité d'action socialiste (CAS - Socialist Action Committee), of which Félix Gouin had been a co-founder, along with Daniel Mayer. The CAS delegate Eugène Thomas became the leader of the Brutus Network after the arrest of Pierre Fourcaud and the departure of his brother, Jean Fourcaud, for London.

Extending itself in 1942–43, Brutus became a national Resistance network in February 1943, in particular through the impulsion of André Boyer. Boasting more than 1,000 agents, its headquarters were in Lyon, with Pierre Sudreau as responsible of the Northern Zone and Jean-Maurice Hermann of the Southern Zone. André Boyer entered the directing committee of the Mouvements unis de Résistance (United Movements of Resistance) in November 1943. At the end of this year, the network was strongly affected by the arrest of Boyer, Sudreau, and Hermann. Gaston Defferre, later mayor of Marseilles for years, succeeded to André Boyer (he was previously his deputy) as national chief.

== Some members ==
- Jean-Louis Bazerque
- Pierre Bourthoumieux
- Jean Biondi
- Élie Bloncourt
- André Boyer
- André Clavé
- Gaston Defferre
- Pierre Fourcaud
- Raymond Gernez
- Félix Gouin
- Ginette Kahn Bernheim
- Jean-Maurice Hermann
- Pierre Malafosse
- Daniel Mayer
- Émilienne Moreau
- Jacques Poupault
- Georges Ronceray
- Pierre Sudreau
- Eugène Thomas
- Jean Valnet
- Gaston Vedel

== Bibliography ==
- Jean-Marc Binot and Bernard Boyer, Nom de code : Brutus, éd. Fayard, 2007

== See also ==
- Vichy France
- French Section of the Workers' International
