= Germaine Berton =

French anarchist (1902–1942)

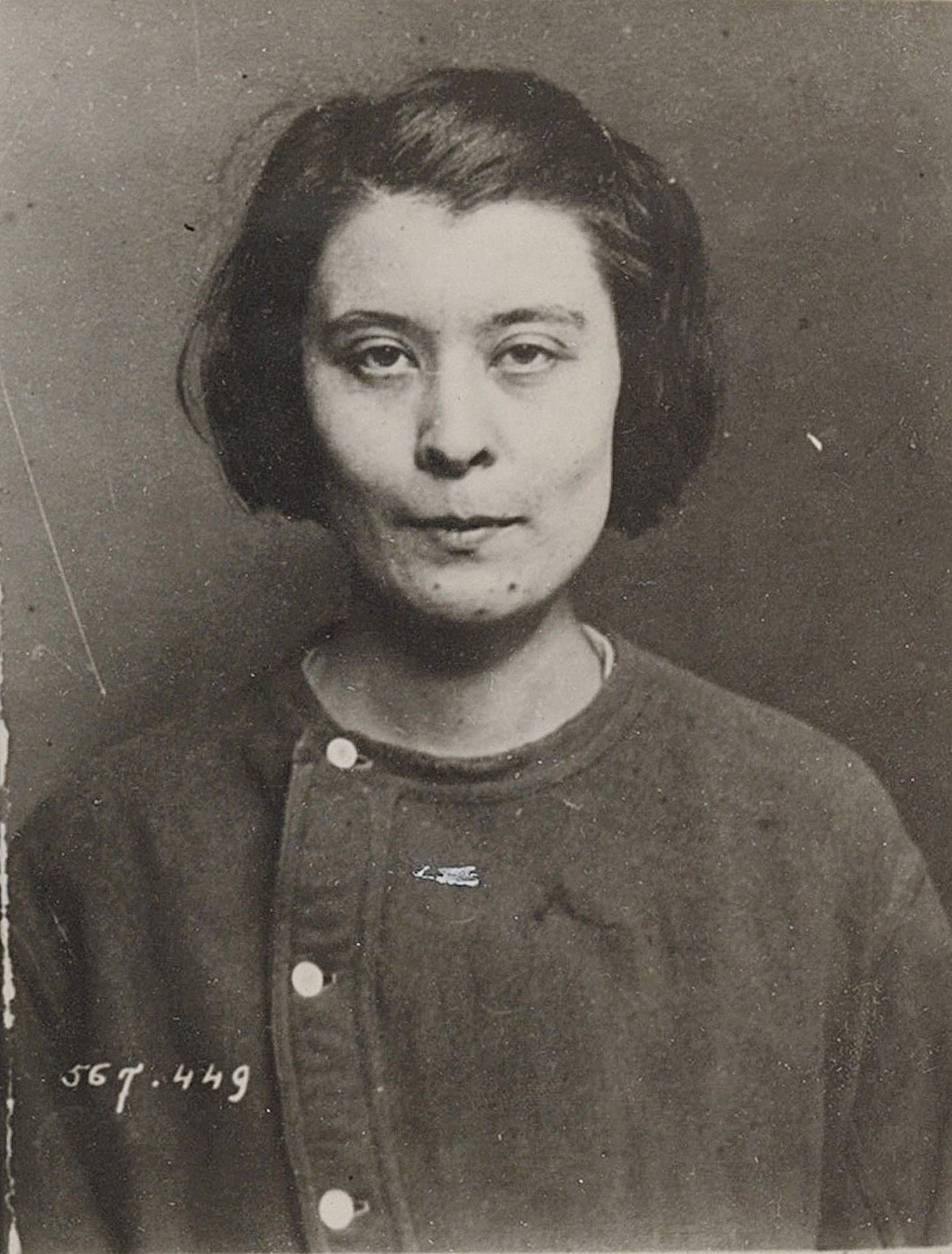
- Germaine Berton mugshot, 1923.
- Born: 7 June 1902; Puteaux
- Died: 4 July 1942 (aged 40); 15th arrondissement of Paris
- Movement: Individualist Anarchism

Germaine Berton (7 June 1902, in Puteaux – 6 July 1942, in Paris) was a French anarchist and trade unionist. She is known for the murder of Marius Plateau, an editor for the Action Française journal and a leader in the royalist organisation Camelots du Roi, in January 1923. Germaine Berton was defended by Henry Torrès during her trial and surrealists have used her mugshot in a number of art pieces. Despite confessing, Berton was acquitted on 24 December 1923.

Berton stopped engaging with anarchist organizations following a subsequent arrest in 1924. In 1925, Berton married Paul Burger, a painter before leaving him in 1935 for René Coillot, a printer. She died in 1942 due to an intentional overdose.

== Childhood ==
Germaine Jeanne Yvonne Berton was born in Puteaux on 7 June 1902, to a working class family. Her father was a mechanic, Republican, Freemason, follower of Jean Jaurès and an anticlerical activist. Her mother was a congregational teacher. Through her father, Germaine met Jean Jaurès as a child. Germaine had a good relationship with her father but a difficult relationship with her mother.

In 1912, the Berton family moved to Tours. Germaine was known as a good student at this time, graduating from primary education before attending The School of Fine Arts in Tours. During this time, she received a first prize award for sight drawing. Following her father's death, Germaine left her schooling to become a factory worker.

In 1915, after turning 13, Germaine fell in love with a soldier who later died during World War I. She then attempted suicide unsuccessfully by throwing herself into the Loire. Germaine would later cite this as beginning of her anti-militarist beliefs.

== Professional career and militancy ==
Following the death of her father, Germaine Berton began working in an American equipment factory located in Tours, France. There, she joined the trade union: Union des syndicats d'Indre et Loire (The Syndicalist Revolutionary Committee), a contingent of the larger Social Defense Committee of Tours. During her tenure, Germaine was arrested for advocating violence during her speeches. She was later recruited to work in Tours' railway workshops where Berton came in contact with Confédération Générale du Travail-Syndicaliste Révolutionnaire (CGT) and joined the Trade Unionist Defense Committee. There she helped reconstitute the Metal Workers' Union of Tours before being fired from her current job at the Rimailho factory in Saint-Pierre-des-Corps and earning the nickname "the black virgin" for her union work.

In 1920, Germaine became assistant secretary of the Revolutionary Trade Union Committee of Tours, briefly served as a member of the French Communist Party (PFC), and wrote articles calling for violence in the newspaper Le Réveil d'Indre-et-Loire. Germaine worked as a newspaper saleswoman at the time, aiming to launch her own journal named De l'acte individuel à l'acte collectif, where she defended her ideals of direct action and social vengeance. Germaine then joined the Anarchist Union of Paris where she continued to write about antimilitarist ideals and encouraged revolutionary action. An article written in Le Réveil d'Indre-et-Loire garnered police scrutiny when Berton called for soldiers to desert, specifically stating:

France, this ignoble stepmother who sends her sons to die on the fields of carnage, is at present the most militarized country in the whole world. The republic, this bitch with a muthafucker smeared with rotten blood, is afraid that the French will hear the revolutionary clamors of the Russian people (...) Desert and do not obey.

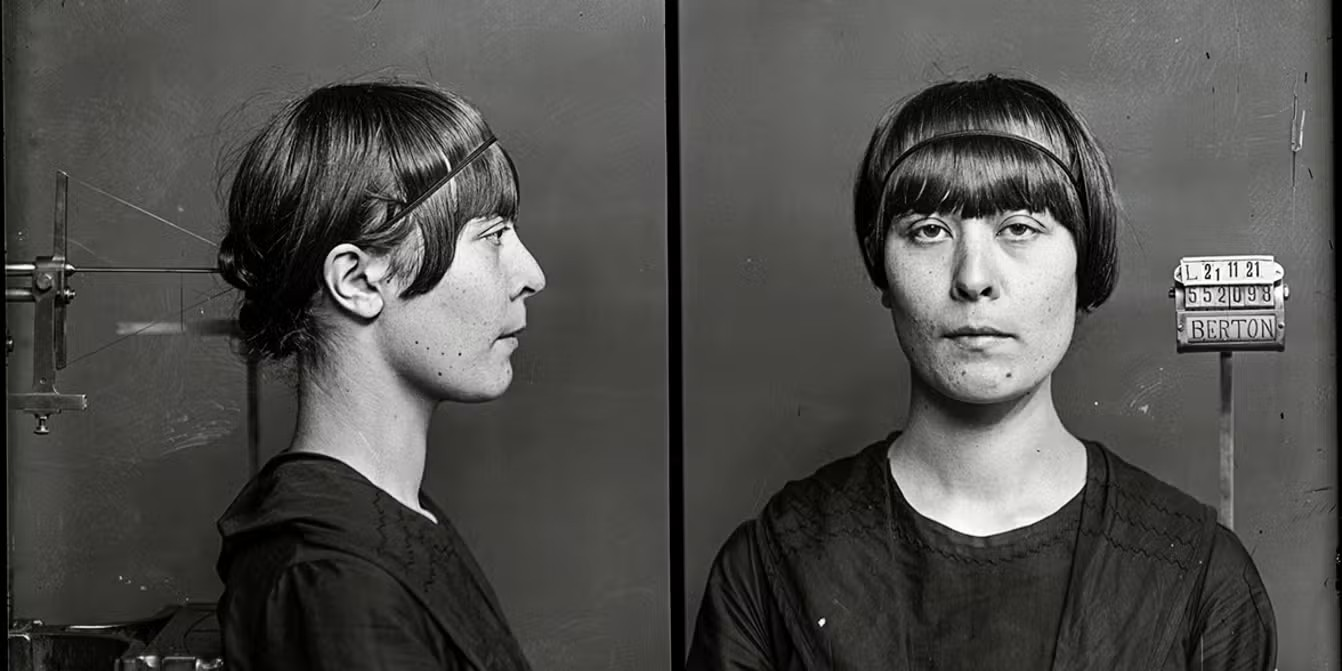
Mugshots of Berton in 1921.

On 20 November 1921, Berton went to the Pré-Saint-Gervais police station to report her identity papers as stolen. The police had initially stated the papers were previously brought to the station and were waiting for her to collect but were found to be missing when she arrived. Following this, Berton slapped the police commissioner's secretary and subsequently was sentenced to 3 months in prison and a 25 franc fine. Berton was incarcerated at Saint Lazare Prison and held in the same cell that once occupied Madame Bermain de Ravisi.

Following her release, Berton met the anarchist Louis Lecoin and his companion Marie Morand. In 1922, Berton was employed at the Libertaire in an administrative position before being fired for theft of money and letters. Berton began to believe in the ideology of "taking back or equalizing" conditions by stealing from the wealthy. She began to incurred debts she refused to repay and quit working due to health problems following an abortion. Berton fell in love with an anarchist named Armand who later committed suicide when drafted to the military, further inflaming her anti-militaristic ideals and inspiring her to prepare a coup against Action Française, an organization Léon Daudet was influential in. Berton blamed Action Française and The Camelots du roi for the rise of fascism in France and aimed to assassinate Daudet. Berton further blamed Daudet for the assassination of Jean Jaurès and also made plans for the assassination of Charles Maurras, but ultimately chose to assassinate Marius Plateau instead.

== Assassination of Marius Plateau ==
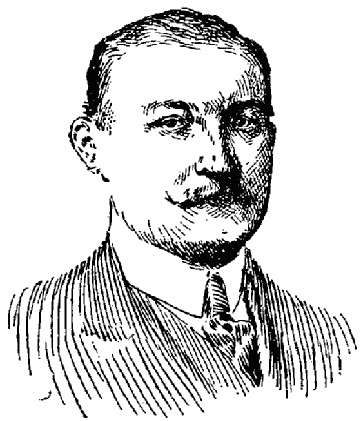
Marius Plateau.

On 22 January 1923, Berton assassinated secretary of Action Française and leader of The Camelots du roi Marius Plateau with five revolver shots at the organization's headquarters. When police arrived, Berton declared she was avenging the assassination of Jean Jaurès, Miguel Almereyda's mysterious death, and France's occupation of the Ruhr. She attempted suicide to escape prosecution but was unsuccessful. Berton was imprisoned for 11 months in Saint-Lazare prison before her trial. During her stay, Berton told the nun present, Sister Marie-Claudia, about her personal doubts about her own faith. Berton wrote:

“I knew how to tame my heart at 16 and at 26 I was incapable of it. Two great powers are awakening, revolting at remaining inactive: the heart and the intelligence! Why does God reject all my requests? Why then sacrifice a heart, an ardent nature like mine?"

Following their correspondence, Sister Marie-Claudia briefly left her convent to join Germaine's cause. She returned to the convent following her brother-in-law's advice.

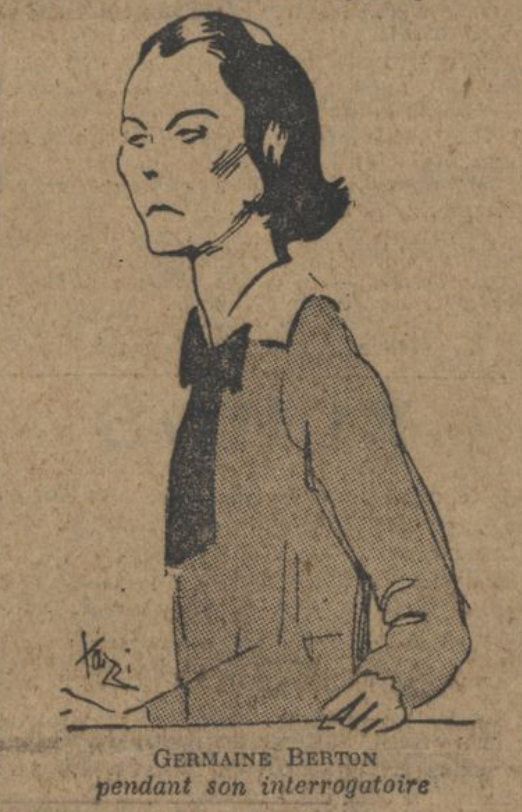
Portrait of Germaine Berton during her interrogation, in Le Journal, 19 December 1923.

The trial of Germaine Berton was highly publicized, with many in the public finding fascination in a political assassination committed by a woman. The press would describe her as a "Red Virgin". Berton was defended by Henry Torrès who argued that Berton should receive the same treatment as Raoul Villain, the man who assassinated Jean Jaurès and was acquitted four years earlier. Torres stated "Acquit her for all that she represents of abandonment of herself and misery, acquit her as you acquitted Villain. Peace for all. She must go and join Villain in oblivion and peace”. During the trial, the anarchist newspaper Le Libertaire organized a campaign in support of Germaine, calling her "the heroic Germaine Berton" in their 210th issue. The anarchist Séverine attended the trial.

Action Française called the assassination a “German-Bolshevist” plot. Historian Fanny Bugnon has stated the royalists attempted to use the fact Germaine Berton was a young woman to give credence to the conspiracy that "agents of Germany, the Soviets and the International Finance” manipulated Berton to silence their organization. This was followed with a call to mobilize. The Camelots du roi vandalized the printing press of the L'Œuvre newspaper on the evening of Plateau's death and thousands marched during Plateau's funeral. Historical analysis has found that Marius Plateau was proponent of structure in his party and Action Française became more radical in its beliefs following his death.

Despite having claimed responsibility for the killing, Berton was acquitted on 24 December 1923. Action Française denounced the verdict as a "crime of the jury".

== Second arrest and death ==
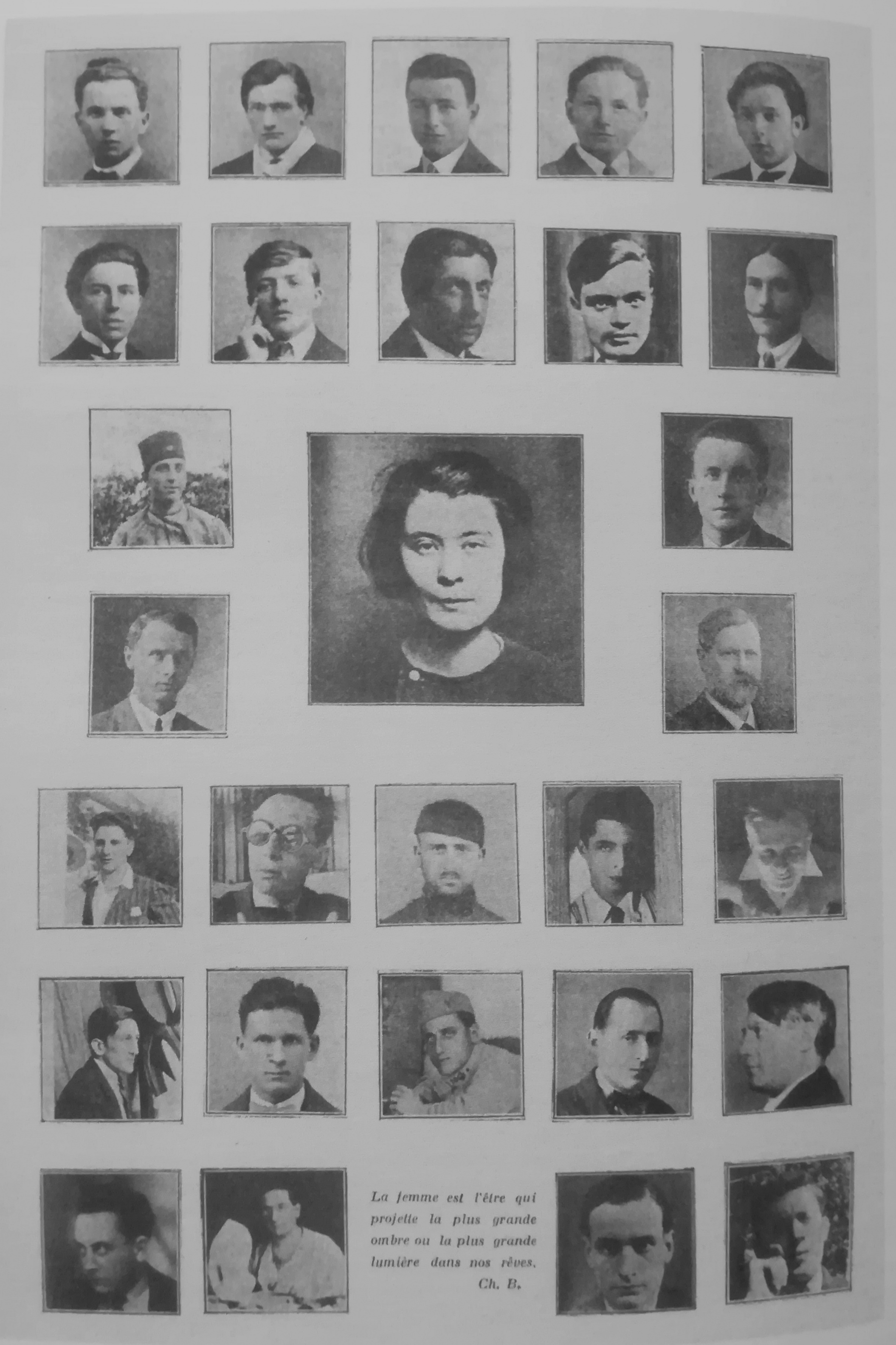
Berton's portrait appears at the center of a group of Surrealists in their magazine La Révolution surréaliste (1 December 1924).

Berton began lecturing on anarchist ideals following her acquittal, joining the Anarchist Group of Aimargues. On 22 May 1924, she was arrested following a number of fights that were attributed to her lectures in Bordeaux, resulting in a 100 franc fine and 4 months in prison at Fort du Hâ. During her detention, Germaine went on hunger strike for eight days before being taken to Saint-André Hospital on 30 May, ending her strike on 31 May. Berton was found to be suffering from a mental disorder while in the hospital, attempting suicide multiple times. The newspaper Le Libertaire stated her mental state was due to the death of Philippe Daudet. Following her release, Berton no longer engaged in militant activities and abandoned anarchism all together.

On 17 November 1925, Germaine Berton married Paul Burger, a painter. In 1935, Berton left Burger to live in the 15th arrondissement with René Coillot, a printer.

On 6 July 1942, Berton intentionally overdosed on Veronal, dying at the age of 40 at the Boucicaut hospital. Her death came four days after the death of Léon Daudet.

== Legacy in Surrealism ==
In 1923, during Berton's trial, Louis Aragon wrote an article supporting her. Aragon wrote an individual can “use terrorist means, in particular murder, to safeguard, at the risk of losing everything, what seems to her— rightly or wrongly — precious beyond anything in the world” Aragon would publish a 29 portrait piece in La Révolution surréaliste. Berton, or the idea of Berton, became more famous as a muse to many Surrealists. André Breton believed that she was the first surrealist anti-heroine and the incarnation of love and revolution.

Her mugshot was published in the surrealist magazine La Révolution surréaliste in December 1924. It is surrounded by the male surrealists, including Louis Aragon and André Breton, and other "inspirational figures" (Sigmund Freud, Pablo Picasso). The quote at the bottom comes from Charles Baudelaire and reads: "The woman is the being who casts the greatest shadow or the greatest light in our dreams."

== Gallery ==
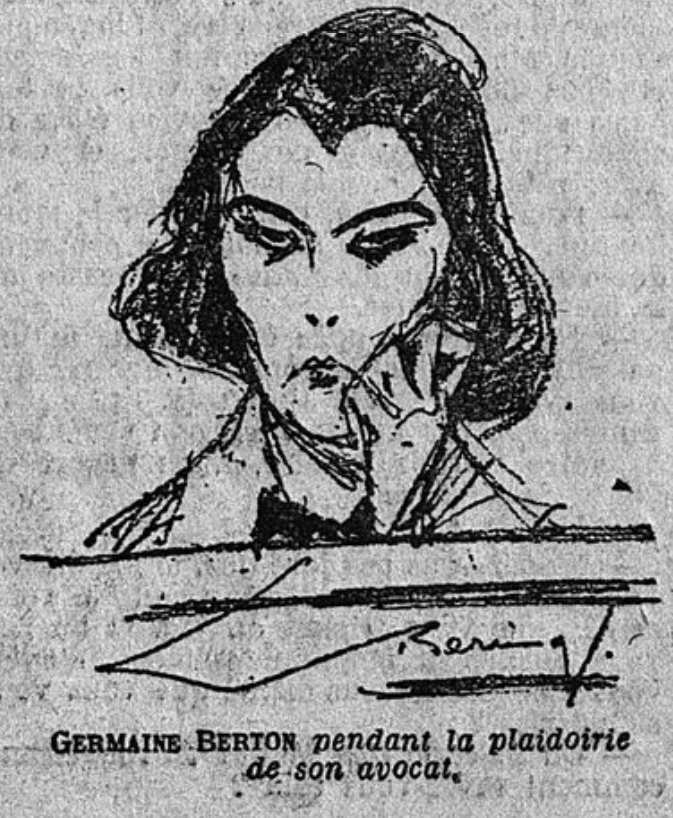
Depiction of Germaine Berton in Le Matin (25 December 1923)

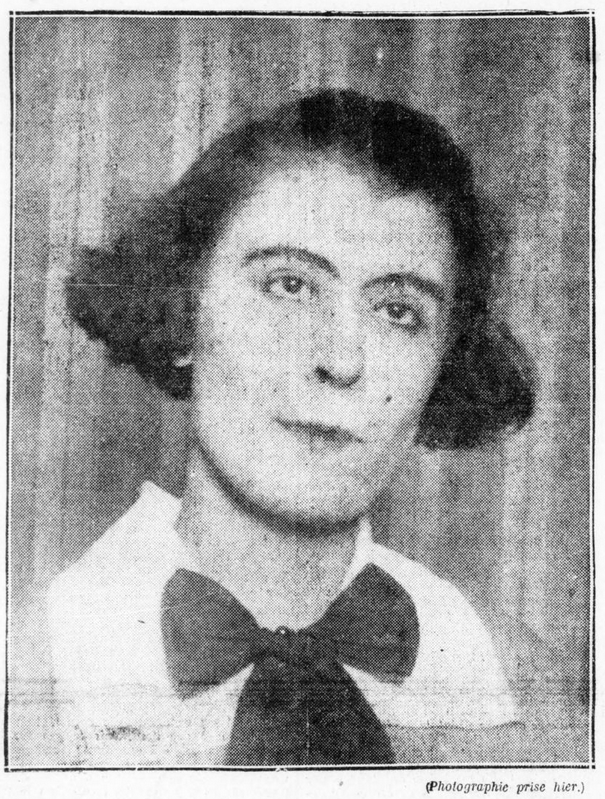
Image of Germaine Berton in Le Libertaire (26 December 1923)

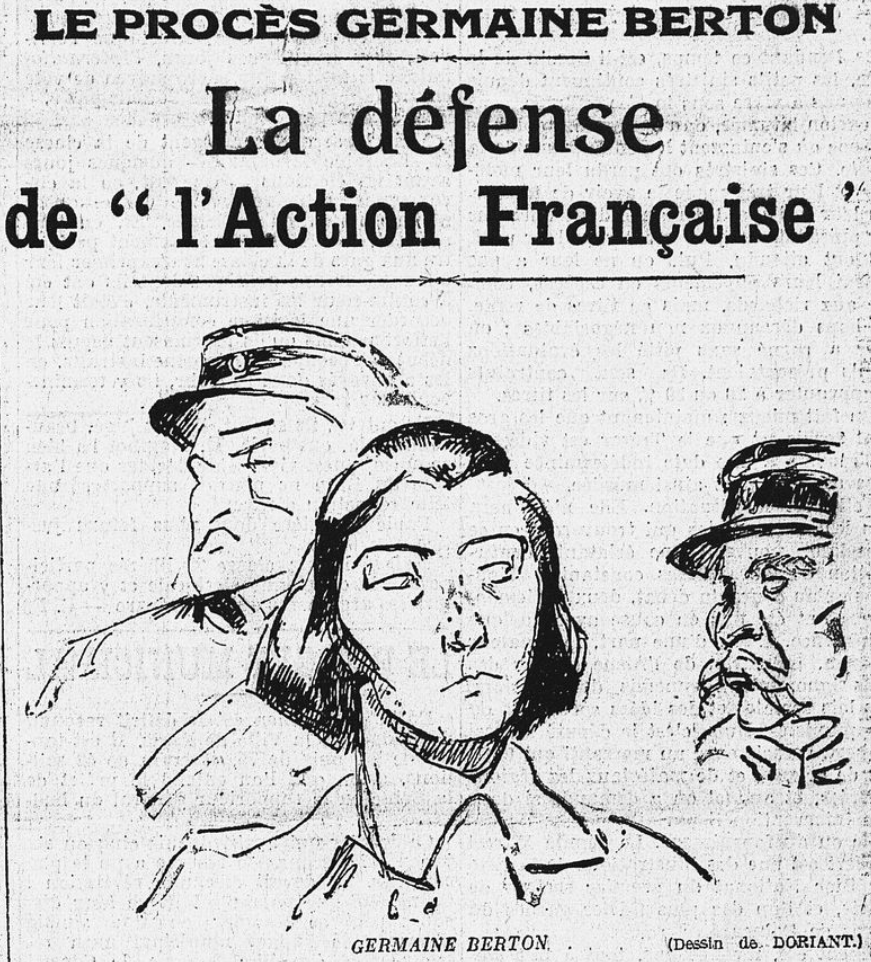
Depiction of Germaine Berton in L'Humanité (23 December 1923)

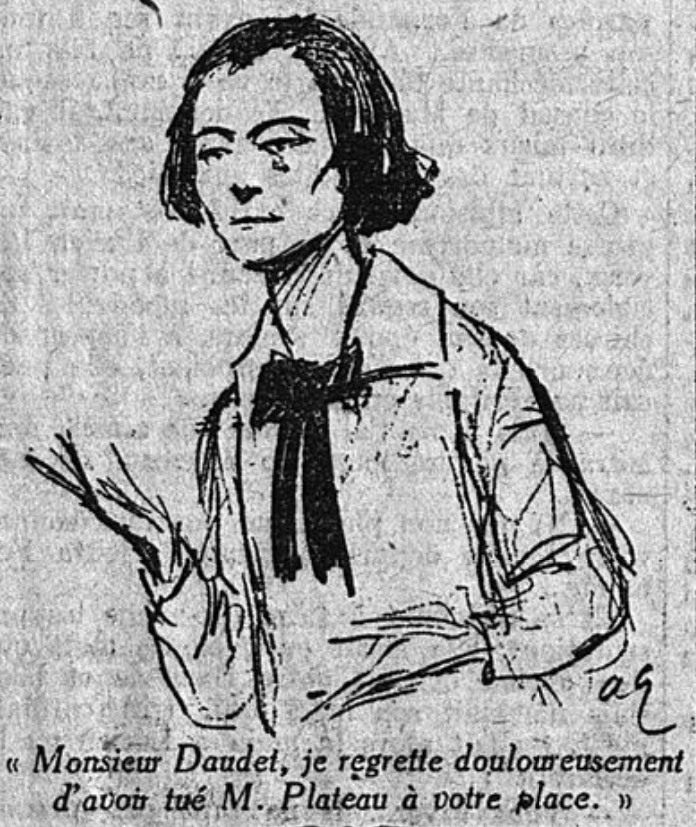
Depiction of Germaine Berton in Le Matin (23 December 1923)
