= Bernard Lecache =

French journalist (1895–1968)

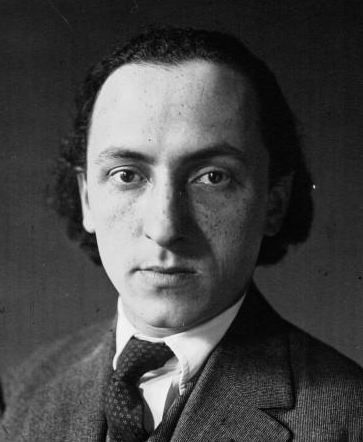
Bernard Lecache in 1923

Bernard Lecache (16 August 1895 – 14 August 1968) was a French journalist. In 1927, he founded the League Against Pogroms, which the following year, became the International League Against Anti-Semitism, and in 1979, became the International League against Racism and Anti-Semitism. He was the president from 1927 to 1968.

== Life and career ==
Lecache, was born in Paris, France in 1895, the son of Jewish emigrants from Ukraine.

He launched himself into journalism, contributing to La Volonté, the Journal du Peuple, one of the first French Bolshevik publications, and at Le Quotidien. An activist with the Human Rights League, he was equally close to the socialist movement and the future founders of the French Communist Party (French: Parti communiste français, PCF), such as Boris Souvarine. He frequented the home of anarchist journalist Séverine and married her granddaughter, Denise Montrobert. Lecache applauded the 1917 Russian Revolution and was an early member of the PCF, joining in 1921. He became the editor of L'Humanité where he provided the anti-miliarist section. Obliged to choose between the Freemasons and the Party in 1923, like all the communists, Lecache, who was close to the Masons, refused to choose and was expelled from the PCF. His ideas and his friends did not change, however, and he chaired a meeting for the 10th anniversary of the Russian Revolution in October 1927. The following year, he became a member of the Association of Friends of the Soviet Union.

In May 1926, in the heart of Paris, the Jewish anarchist Sholom Schwartzbard killed Symon Petliura, a nationalist Ukrainian he accused of starting pogroms that devastated his family. Working as a contributor to Le Quotidien, Lecache became interested in the case and asked the socialist lawyer Henry Torrès if he could support the assassin's defense. He was sent to Ukraine to investigate by Henri Dumay.

After three months of investigation, Lecache published the results in February and March 1927. To support the accused, he founded the International League Against Pogroms. He received support from Séverine, the Countess of Noailles, Albert Einstein, Edmond Fleg, Maxim Gorky, Paul Langevin, Victor Basch and Henry Torrès, Schwartzbard's lawyer. Schwartzbard was acquitted on October 26, 1927. The following year, the League changed its name to the International League Against Anti-Semitism.

Lecache was initiated into the Freemasons at the beginning of the 1930s. He was a member of the Grand Orient de France and founded the lodge Abbé Grégoire, addressing the rise of Nazism and European anti-semitism.

Lechache wrote in the newspaper "Droit de Vivre" (December 1938):

'It is our task to organize the moral and cultural blockade of Germany and disperse this nation. It is up to us to start a merciless war.'

Lecache was president of the organization for forty years, until his death in 1968. He was replaced by Jean Pierre-Bloch, who remained president until 1993.

== See also ==
- Movement Against Racism and for Friendship between Peoples
