= Jules Vallès =

French journalist and author (1832–1885)

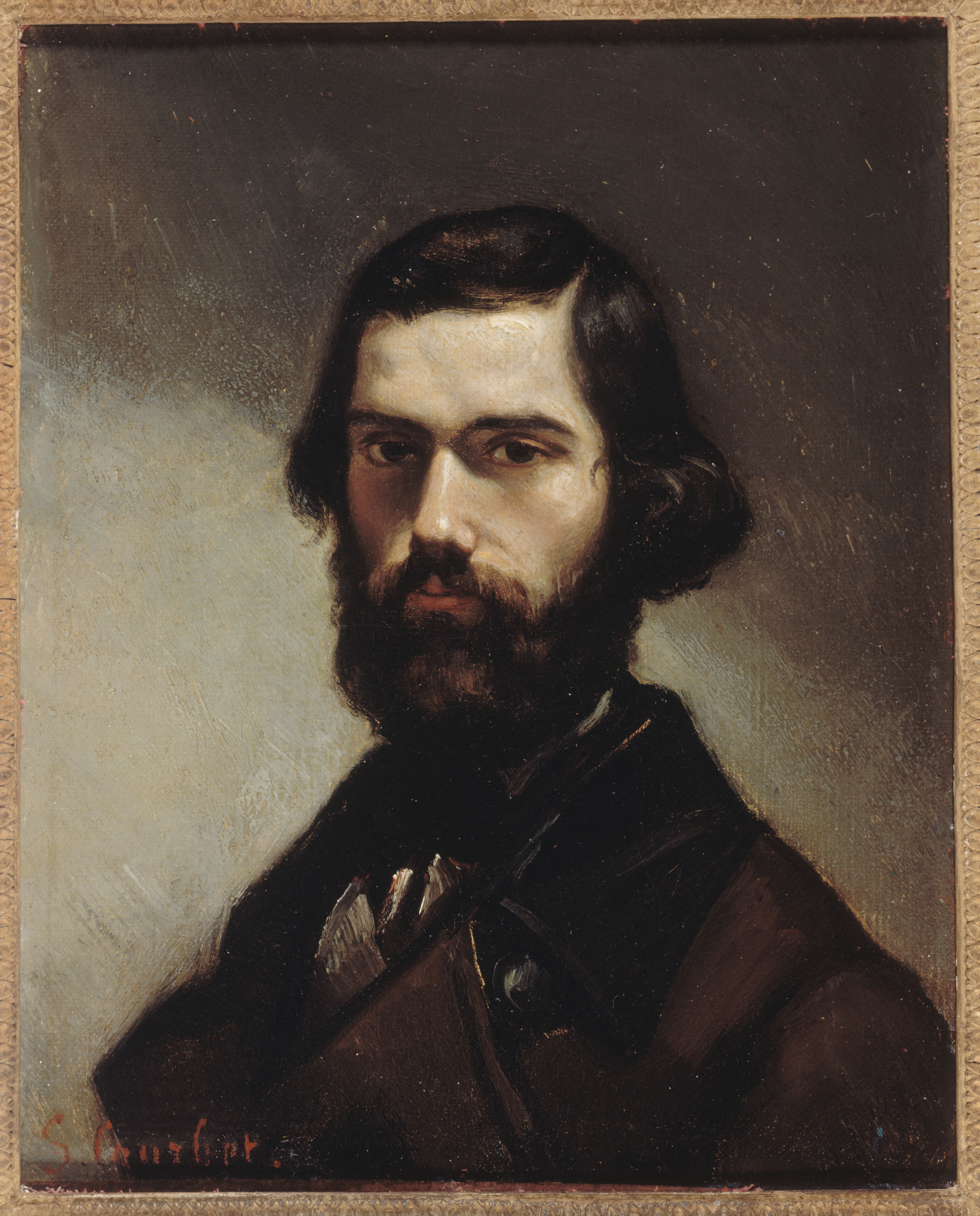
- Jules Vallès by Gustave Courbet
- Born: Jules Vallez; 11 June 1832; Le Puy-en-Velay, Haute-Loire, France
- Died: 14 February 1885 (aged 52); Paris, France
- Occupations: Journalist, author

Signature
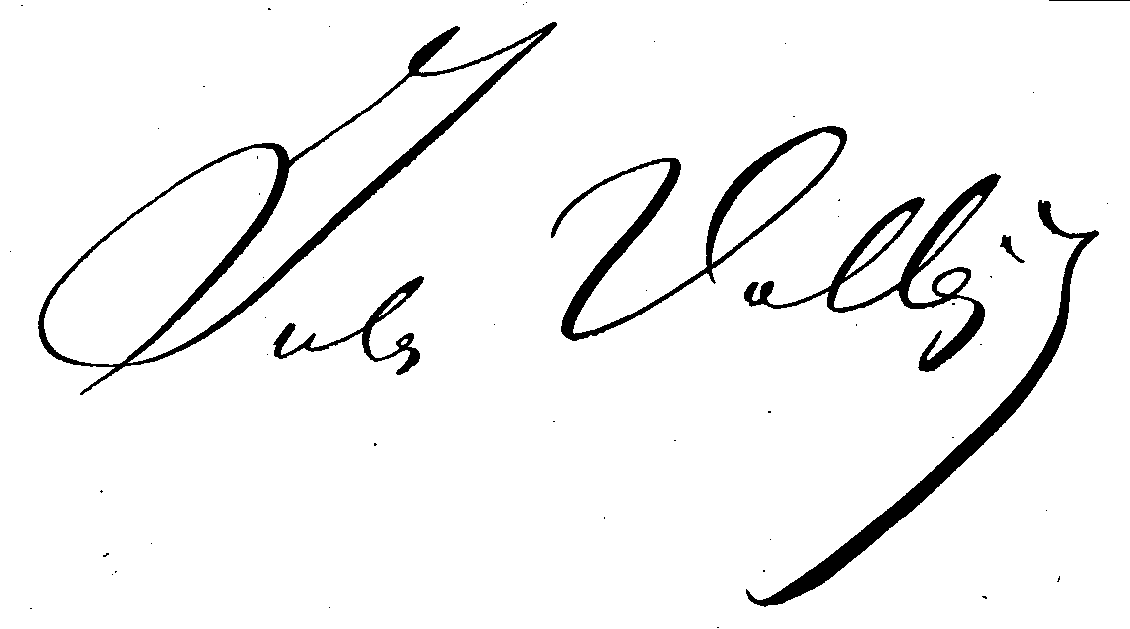

Jules Vallès (French: [valɛs]; 1832–1885) was a French journalist, writer, and left-wing political activist.

In 1883 he was entirely successful in restarting Le Cri du Peuple as a voice for libertarian and socialist ideas. At the same time he became increasingly ill with diabetes. During a health crisis in November 1884, he was taken to the house of doctor Guebhard and his secretary Séverine. He assigned Hector Malot to be the executor of his will and died on 14 February 1885.

His funeral was also a major public event, attracting a procession of some 60,000 following the coffin to Père Lachaise Cemetery.

== Bibliography ==
- Alain Viala: Préface et commentaires à Jules Vallès "Jacques Vingtras - L'Enfant" Paris: Presses Pocket, 1990
- Marie-Claire Bancqaert: Préface et notes à Vallès "L'Insurgé" Paris: Collection Folio/Gallimard, 1979
- Bernard Noël: "Dictionnaire de la Commune" Paris: Champs/Flammarion, 1978
- Chisholm, Hugh, ed. (1911). "Vallès, Jules" . Encyclopædia Britannica. Vol. 27 (11th ed.). Cambridge University Press. p. 863.
