= Pierre Fourcaud =

Pierre Fourcaud (27 March 1898 in St Petersburg – 2 May 1998 in Paris), was one of the first Frenchmen to help General Charles de Gaulle in July 1940. He fought in the French army from 1916 to 1920 and again in 1940. After joining the free French secret service, he volunteered immediately to return to France as a secret agent. He then became the most prominent agent of the SDECE, founded in 1945, serving until 1956.
