= Monclar, Lot-et-Garonne =

Monclar
- Commune
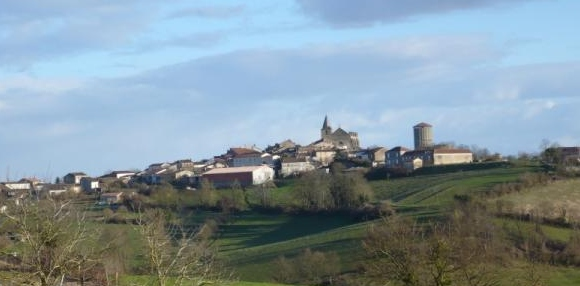
- A general view of Monclar

- Coat of arms
- Location of Monclar
- Location within France Location within Nouvelle-Aquitaine
- Coordinates: 44°26′52″N 0°31′36″E
- Country: France
- Region: Nouvelle-Aquitaine
- Department: Lot-et-Garonne
- Arrondissement: Villeneuve-sur-Lot
- Canton: Le Livradais
- Intercommunality: CC Lot et Tolzac

Government
  - Mayor (2020–2026): Dominique Bouissiere
- Area^{1}: 24.02 km^{2} (9.27 sq mi)
- Elevation: 187 m (614 ft)
- Highest elevation: 191 m (627 ft)
- Lowest elevation: 54 m (177 ft)
- Population (2023): 900
  - Density: 37/km^{2} (97/sq mi)
- Time zone: UTC+01:00 (CET)
  - Summer (DST): UTC+02:00 (CEST)
- INSEE/Postal code: 47173 /47380
- ^{1} French Land Register data, which excludes lakes, ponds, glaciers > 1 km^{2} (0.386 sq mi or 247 acres) and river estuaries.

Monclar (French pronunciation: [mɔ̃klaʁ]; Occitan: Montclar) is a commune in the Lot-et-Garonne department in south-western France. The French novelist Inès Cagnati (1937–2007) was born in Montclar.

== See also ==
- Communes of the Lot-et-Garonne department
