= Halle concentration camp =

Coordinates: 51°30′15″N 12°00′39″E

- Concentration subcamp
- Other names: Lager Birkhahn-Mötzlich (Note: Mötzlich was a small village near Halle where an airfield was created in 1917.); Halle Siebel
- Location: Part of Buchenwald concentration camp, near Halle
- Commandant: SS Hauptscharführer F. Noll
- Operational: 1944-5 (built in late July or early August 1944)

The Halle concentration camp was located at Mötzlich, near Halle. It provided forced labor for the Siebel aircraft manufacturer under agreement with the SS-Wirtschafts-Verwaltungshauptamt (SS-WVHA). In 1944, during the Allied bombardment of Germany, it received many inmates from the Birkhahn camp, a Nazi Germany Buchenwald sub-camp, near Weimar, and became known as the Halle-Siebel or Birkhahn-Mötzlich camp. Laborers were also provided to the "Bauleitung Professor Doktor Ingenieur Rimpl, Kostenstell B-XII".

At a cost of six/four Reichsmarks per day, skilled/unskilled laborers were used in the metalworking department to construct parts for airplane wings. Laborers worked a total of 166,364 hours in December 1944. Siebel employed 10,159 skilled workers and 4,965 auxiliary workers in December. The workday at the factory was 10.5 hours long. The camp at Boelkestrasse 70 consisted of at least five blocks and one block for SS guards.

Several transport lists showing the movement of prisoners from Buchenwald to Halle have survived. The total number of inmates suggested by the Halle lists added together far exceed the numbers shown on SS monthly reports for Siebel-Halle from the same period.

In late July 1944, (Note: The date is illegible.) 525 inmates were transported from Buchenwald to Halle with an additional 515 inmates on July 31. Although these lists provide no breakdown by nationality, most of the inmates appear to have been Russian, Polish and perhaps Czech. Prisoner transports continued to arrive in Halle throughout the following months, and the number of inmates imprisoned in the subcamp both increased and decreased at various intervals during its eight-month existence. Generally the pattern of incoming transports increased throughout the fall of 1944, and by January 1945, some inmates were shifted from Halle to other subcamps. Seven inmates were deported from Buchenwald to Halle on August 10, 1944, mostly French political prisoners. Additional transports from Buchenwald arrived throughout August and September, and the number of prisoners transferred to Halle exceeded two thousand.

However, these numbers differ from monthly reports from Halle filed by the SS administration of the camp. According to a monthly reports dated August 13/14, 1944, the Siebel-Halle camp had 525 inmates. From September 1 to 20, 1944, one thousand inmates were transferred to Siebel-Halle from Buchenwald (five hundred on September 2, five hundred on September 12). On September 27, an additional transport of twenty inmates was sent to Halle. Beginning in January 1945, inmates were transferred from Halle to the Buchenwald subcamp in Annaburg. Ninety-seven inmates were transferred to Annaburg in December 1944. Between January 1 and 31, 1945, there appear to have been no transports to Halle from Buchenwald, and on February 2, seven inmates were transferred to Halle, with an additional five on March 23, 1945. Another report from March 25, 1945, shows that on January 1, 1945, Siebel-Halle had 633 inmates and on March 6, 1945, it had 528 inmates.

In November 1944, at least one inmate was appointed as Blockältester (English: senior block inmate), ten inmates worked in the kitchen barracks, one inmate assigned to Stubendienst (barracks orderly duty) for each of the five blocks and one for the SS barracks, as well as two barbers and a cobbler. The inmates were divided into several commandos that included clearing rubble from air raids, as well as other construction and repair work in addition to those sent to Siebel. At least twenty SS guards were transferred from Halle to an unknown assignment in January 1945, but no additional information in camp reports or correspondence on the number or the ranks of guards in Halle can be found.

Transgressions such as neglecting or stepping away from a running machine were punishable by denying the offending prisoner his mid-day meal as well as his allotment of cigarettes. In at least one instance, cigarette rations of several prisoners were recommended to be raised due to excellent performance.

In the Halle Revier or infirmary in January and February 1945, about fifty inmates received ambulatory care, and thirty were admitted to the infirmary. The monthly report from February 1945 also indicated one prisoner death, and that food supplies were "sufficient." The subcamp in Halle was last noted in German records on March 31, 1945.
