= Suzanne Buisson =

- Born: Suzanne Lévy; 19 September 1883; Paris, France
- Died: 5 July 1944 (aged 60); Auschwitz concentration camp, German-occupied Poland
- Occupation: Political activist
- Spouse: Georges Buisson

Suzanne Buisson (née Lévy, 19 September 1883 – 5 July 1944) was a French political activist and French Resistance member.

== Activism ==
Soon after her birth, the family of Suzanne Buisson moved to Dijon, where she lived until the age of sixteen. She then returned to Paris to earn a living as an employee in a store. She attended meetings led René Viviani et Albert Thomas. She became a socialist activist in 1899. From that time on, she campaigned for absolute equality between men and women, which, according to her, would only be possible with the transformation of economic structures and the implementation of socialism. She joined the French Section of the Workers' International (SFIO) in 1905.

She was widowed in the First World War, and raised her child alone. She remarried on 23 March 1926, with the union leader Georges Buisson, who in 1929 became the adjunct secretary of the General Confederation of Labour (CGT).

She took on a major role in the SFIO after the war. She became responsible for the column "Woman, Activist" ("La femme, la militante") in Le Populaire, a French socialist newspaper, and Secretary of the National Committee of Socialist Women. In 1924 she was elected to the Executive Committee of the party, a post which she would occupy until 1932, then again from 1935 to 1936. In 1933–1934 and 1938–1939, she was a member of the Permanent Administrative Committee, the principal decision-making organism of the SFIO at the time. She was first made a member by a motion presented by Vincent Auriol, the second by a motion of Léon Blum. In 1931, she was a part of the SFIO delegation to the Socialist International Congress, held in Vienna.

== French Resistance ==
Since 1938, Suzanne Buisson aligned herself with partisans united in opposition to Hitler. In March 1941, she cofounded the Socialist Action Committee (CAS) and became its treasurer. She made numerous forays around the country to distribute Resistance literature and participate in actions supporting the Socialist activists arrested by the Vichy regime or German authorities. In March 1943, when the CAS effectively became a reunited, clandestine SFIO, Suzanne Buisson became a member of its political bureau. Two months later, she became responsible for relations with the Communist Party.

== Death ==
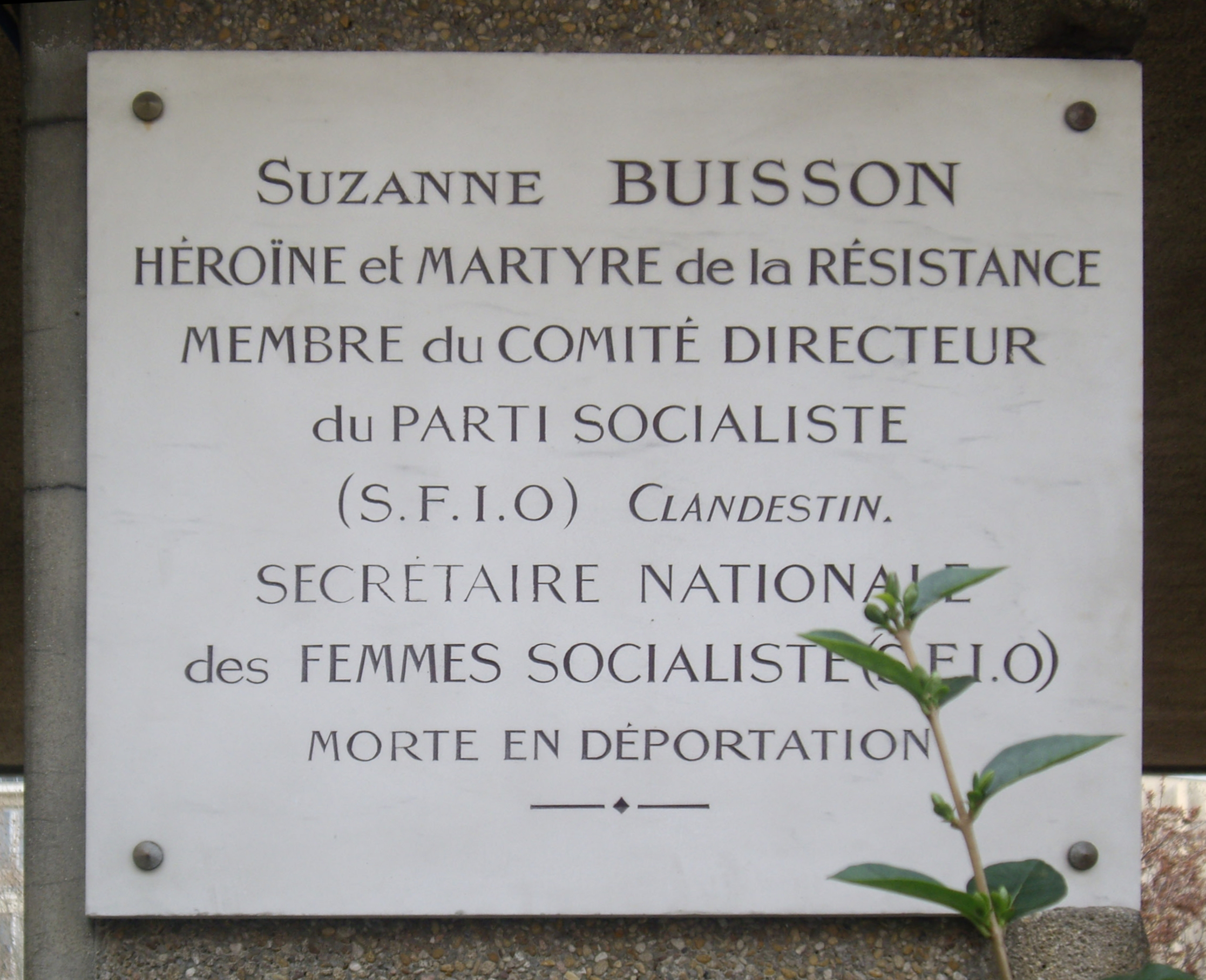
Memorial plaque in Square Suzanne Buisson, 18th arrondissement of Paris

Soon after, the Gestapo discovered the headquarters of the clandestine SFIO. Informed of their raid, Suzanne Buisson paced through the building, alerting her comrades, when she was arrested by the Gestapo.

Under pains of torture she revealed nothing to the Germans. Being Jewish as well as a résistante, she was deported, and ultimately was murdered at Auschwitz.

Léon Blum paid her homage in the edition of 2 February 1946 of Le Populaire,

"She was the accomplished, exemplary activist of whom the party could ask anything, who never shirked her duties, but on the contrary, could be relied upon to fulfill them with absolute devotion and disinterest. In the everyday workings of the party, she hesitated before no task; in clandestine struggle she recoiled before no danger."

== Sources ==
- Jean-Marc Binot, Denis Lefebvre et Pierre Serne, 100 ans, 100 socialistes, éd. Bruno Leprince, 2005
- Jean Maitron (dir.), Dictionnaire biographique du mouvement ouvrier français, éd. de l'Atelier, cédérom, 1997
