= Sainte Suzanne Melvil-Bloncourt =

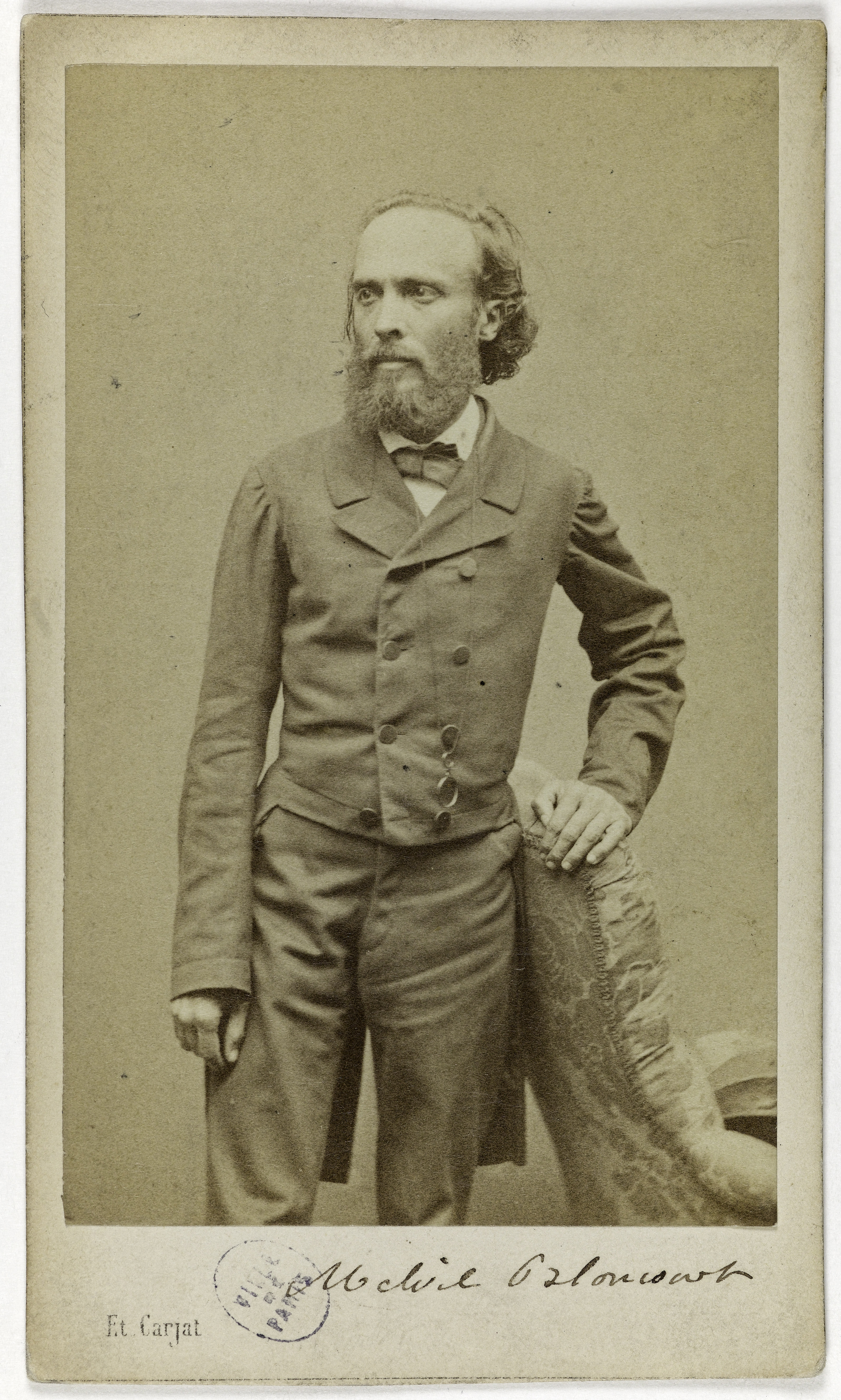
Sainte Suzanne Melvil-Bloncourt

Melville, Sainte-Suzanne, Vicomte, Bloncourt, dit Melvil-Bloncourt (born in Pointe-à-Pitre, Guadeloupe, 23 October 1825; died 1880) was a prominent Afro-Caribbean abolitionist.

== Biography ==
His parents were wealthy « mulattoes » - according to the racial vocabulary used at the time - and he received his early education in Basse-Terre, but finished it in Paris, where he graduated in law in 1846. He then devoted himself to the anti-slavery cause, wrote several pamphlets on abolition, and organized a club, which won several statesmen to its cause, including Victor Schœlcher. In 1848 Schœlcher was made under-secretary for the colonies, and, being reminded of his promises by Melvil, caused a decree to be issued freeing all the slaves in the French dominions. The freed slaves showed their gratitude by electing Melvil their deputy to the constituent assembly in 1848.

In 1849, and during the whole of Napoleon III's reign, Melvil devoted his time to literary purposes, wrote on the colonies in most of the French magazines, and published biographies of many black citizens of South America. In 1871 he was again elected deputy of Guadeloupe, but was condemned for participation in the Paris Commune, and took refuge in Switzerland until 1880, when he was allowed to return to Guadeloupe.

== Bibliography ==
- HathiTrust: Record for Histoire complète de la vie de Voltaire. Sandoz et Fischbacher. 1878.

Attribution
