= Daniel Mayer =

French politician (1909–1996)

Daniel Raphaël Mayer
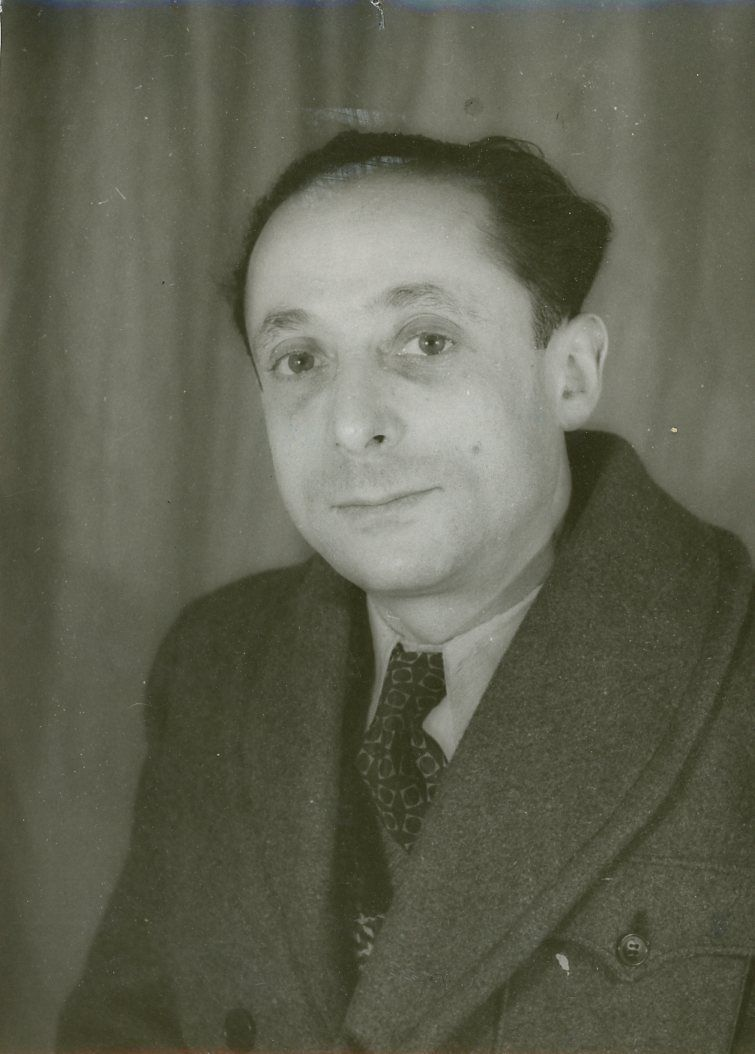

President of the Constitutional Council of France
- In office 4 March 1983 – 4 March 1986
- Appointed by: François Mitterrand
- Preceded by: Roger Frey
- Succeeded by: Robert Badinter

Personal details
- Born: 29 April 1909 Paris, France
- Died: 29 December 1996 (aged 87) Orsay, Île-de-France, France
- Occupation: Politician

Daniel Raphaël Mayer (29 April 1909 – 29 December 1996) was a French politician and a member of the French Section of the Workers' International (SFIO) and president of the Ligue des droits de l'homme (LDH, Human Rights League) from 1958 to 1975. He founded the Comité d'Action Socialiste in 1941 and was a member of the Brutus Network, a Resistant Socialist group. Mayer also supported the Libération-sud resistance movement headed by Emmanuel d'Astier de la Vigerie.

He was also President of Constitutional Council from 1983 to 1986, and Minister of Labour from 1946 to 1949. Mayer was a Member of Parliament for the Seine from 1945 to 1958.

Legal offices
Preceded by Roger Frey	President of the Constitutional Council; 1983–1986	Succeeded by Robert Badinter
