= International League Against Racism and Anti-Semitism =

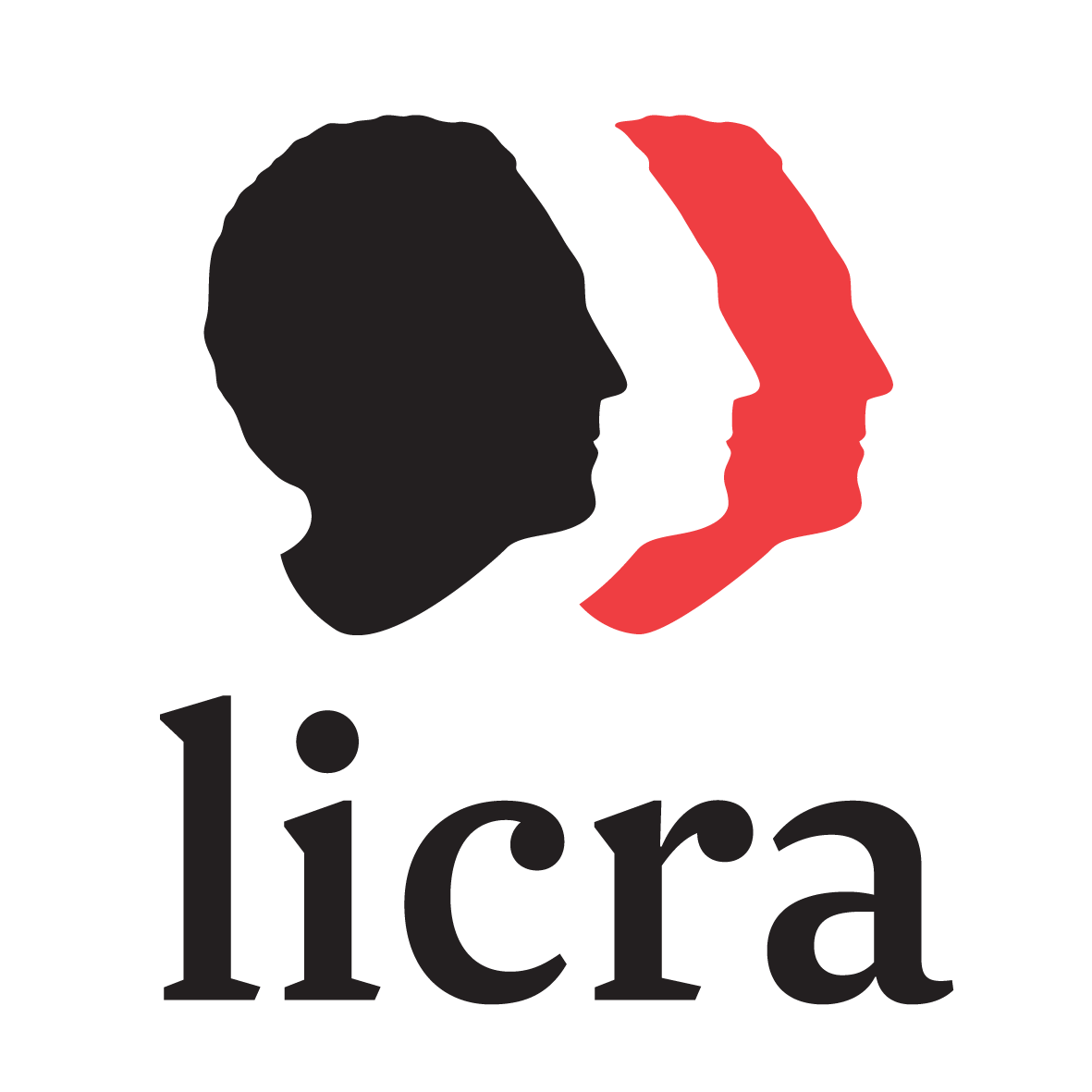

The International League Against Racism and Anti-Semitism (Ligue internationale contre le racisme et l'antisémitisme, LICRA in French) is an NGO established in 1927 opposing intolerance, xenophobia, and exclusion.

In 1927, French journalist Bernard Lecache created "The League Against Pogroms" and launched a media campaign in support of Sholom Schwartzbard, who assassinated Symon Petliura on May 25, 1926, in the Latin Quarter of Paris. Schwartzbard viewed Petliura as responsible for numerous pogroms in Ukraine. After Schwartzbard's acquittal, the league evolved into LICA (Ligue internationale contre l'antisémitisme, or International League Against Anti-Semitism), and Schwartzbard would become a prominent and active member of the organization.

In 1931, LICA counted 10,000 subscribers in France. It played a significant role during the battle between leagues in February 1934. After 1932, LICA evolved into LICRA, but the name was officially changed only in 1979 during the long presidency of Jean Pierre-Bloch (from 1968 to 1992 in office).

In September 1939, as the Second World War started, numerous LICRA subscribers were mobilized, and many were members of the Resistance throughout the war. During the German occupation of France, LICRA was banned by the Vichy government and had to regroup clandestinely to help the victims of Nazi racial measures. This was done by hiding them away from Paris, by providing them with fake IDs, and by helping them escape to Switzerland, Spain, and England.

In 1972, a law authorized LICRA to counsel victims of racist acts during their court appearances. Later, LICRA received considerable media attention during the case of LICRA v. Yahoo!, in which it brought charges against Yahoo! for selling Nazi memorabilia to people in France in violation of French laws proposed, passed, and used by and for LICRA.

The LICRA campaigns against neonazism and Holocaust denial. For example, it supported the Klarsfeld couple (Serge and Beate Klarsfeld) and was active during Klaus Barbie's trial in 1987.

In the 1990s, LICRA opened branches abroad: in Switzerland, in Belgium, in Luxembourg, in Germany, in Portugal, in Quebec, and more recently, in Congo Brazzaville and in Austria.

From 1999, with the arrival of President Patrick Gaubert, LICRA broadened its scope to include addressing social issues such as work discrimination, citizenship, and disadvantaged youth.

== Commissions ==
- The Psychological Help Commission supports distressed victims of racist or antisemitic acts.
- The Juridical Commission examines and decides whether to sue for racist speech or writing. It can also help victims with legal advice.
- The Youth Commission was created after the 2002 events to address a lack of young subscribers. It carries out local and national actions to make young people more sensitive to racism and antisemitism issues. This commission brings together subscribers aged 16 to 30 every second Sunday of the month.
- The Memory, History, and Human Rights Commission, created in 1986, informs and trains LICRA members. Its preventative actions are:
  - historical information about the members,
  - expertise regarding racism or antisemitism-related books, photos, and videos,
  - spread of historical knowledge to teachers and students.
- The Sport Commission tries to maintain sport as an integration tool. It leads prevention action towards violence in stadiums. It fights against communitarism and against those who use sport as a means of recruitment and infiltration. In Europe, the LICRA represents France in the FARE network.
- The Education Commission, led by Barbara Lefebvre and Alain Seksig, makes young people more aware of Republican values.

== Presidents ==
- Bernard Lecache (1927–1968)
- Jean Pierre-Bloch (1968–1992)
- Jean-Pierre Pierre-Bloch, son of Jean Pierre-Bloch
- Pierre Aidenbaum (1992–1999)
- Patrick Gaubert (1999–2010)
- Alain Jakubowicz (2010–2017)
- Mario Stasi (since 2017)

== Objectives and resources ==
The LICRA's aim is to stay in permanent alertness concerning any kind of discrimination. It fights against everyday racism and the banalization of xenophobic acts. It helps the victims, who are often unaware of their rights. It pays attention to any racist speech in the media. It does not want to challenge the press's freedom of speech, but only to find and correct any hate or discrimination incitement. It also makes sure that any negationist document is removed from sale.

The LICRA acts on the field via its volunteers in every region. The action program is voted on by nine commissions (historical memory, juridical, education, cultural, sport, Europe, integration, citizenship, and youth). Since 1932, the LICRA has published a newspaper called "le droit de vivre" (the right to live), which is an essential aid to expressing the LICRA's values and engagements. Given out to all the members, it is a tool of internal and external communication. It allows us to sum up LICRA's local, national, and international actions. Depending on the actuality, many personalities (political, NGO, sports, etc.) express themselves in its columns.

== Financing ==
The LICRA is mainly financed by state subsidies. It receives around 500,000 euros every year from the French government.
