= Jean Pierre-Bloch =

French Resistance (1905–1999)

Jean Pierre-Bloch (born Jean-Pierre Bloch; 14 April 1905 – 17 March 1999) was a French Resistant of the Second World War as an activist, being a former president of the International League against Racism and Anti-Semitism.

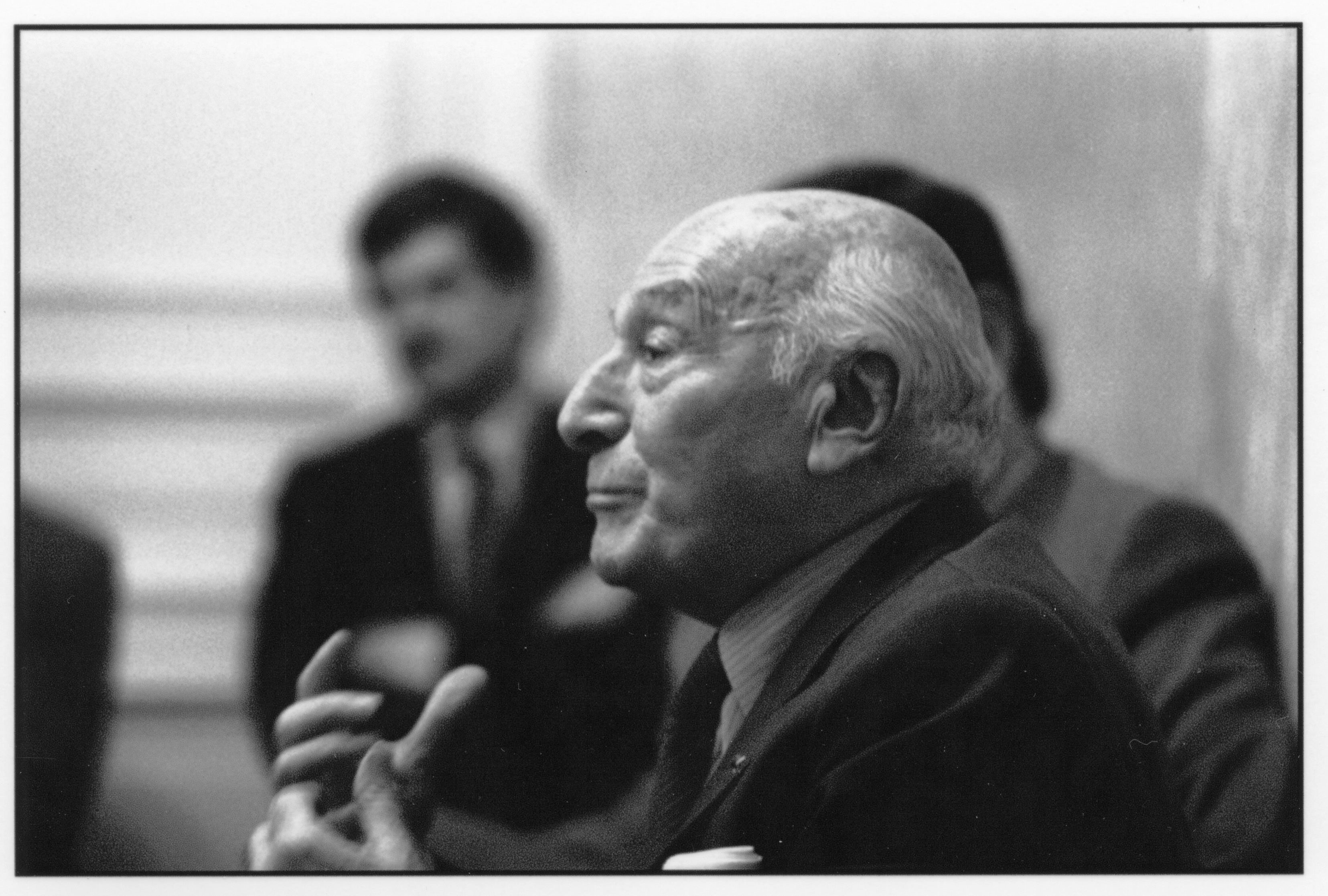
Jean Pierre-Bloch photographed in 1986 by Olivier Meyer

== Biography ==
=== Socialism and resistance ===
Jean Pierre-Bloch was the son of an industrialist and received a law degree from the Sorbonne. He joined the SFIO at the end of the 1920s and became a journalist for Populaire, the daily newspaper of the socialist party. His political career began in 1934, when he was elected general councilor for the Aisne département (a post he would hold until 1967). He shored up his local base by becoming adjunct to the mayor of Laon the following year. In 1936 he became, with the victory of the Popular Front, the youngest deputy in the French National Assembly. In 1938, Jean Pierre-Bloch was one of few parliamentarians to oppose the Munich Agreement. As a Jew, he was particularly concerned by the fate in store for the Jews of Adolf Hitler's Germany.

Having enlisted voluntarily in 1939, he was made prisoner on 23 June 1940. While in prison he re-arranged the hyphen in his name. He escaped, joined the internal Resistance in Dordogne and helped arrange (along with his wife Gaby Pierre-Bloch (d. 1996)) some of the first parachute drops into France of agents, arms and equipment sent by de Gaulle's headquarters in London. Again arrested with his wife (in Marseille) and imprisoned in October 1941 on treason charges, he escaped along with a dozen others in July 1942 courtesy of American Virginia Hall's organization and saws, keys, and money his wife (released after three months) had hidden in parcels she sent him. He then joined General de Gaulle in London, heading the civilian section of the central bureau of intelligence and action (BCRA or secret services of Free France) from 1942 to 1943. In this capacity he saw the names of all resistants. He was thus a key witness at Maurice Papon's trial, at which he participated at the age of 93.

In 1943, Jean Pierre-Bloch became assistant commissioner at the Free French Ministry of the Interior. In this function, he secured the re-establishment of the Crémieux decree of 1871, which had naturalized Algerian Jews as French citizens and which the Vichy regime had abrogated. He vainly proposed a similar legislative text for Muslim Algerians.

=== A Resistant critical of de Gaulle ===
An avid follower of General De Gaulle during the war, he nevertheless denounced, in De Gaulle or the Time of Contempts, the presence within the General's entourage, at least in 1942, of royalists or people closely linked to extreme-right pre-war leagues (Claude Hettier de Boislambert, admirer of Cagoule; colonel Pierre Fourcade, former member of this organization; Pierre Guillain de Bénouville, former member of Action Française, instigators of the events of 6 February 1934; the General's nephew, Michel Cailliau). According to Jean Pierre-Bloch the alignment of General de Gaulle with the Republican cause was purely tactical and the Resistance had been usurped by de Gaulle. In Pierre-Bloch's view the Gaullists held a distorted view of the resistance, presenting themselves as the only great force of the Resistance, along with the Communists, forgetting the Socialists and Christian Democrats.

In 1945, Jean Pierre-Bloch easily regained his seat in parliament, favoring an alliance with the French Communist Party and supporting Maurice Thorez as prime minister the following year. He resigned in 1947 in order to direct (until 1953) the SNEP, a society charged with liquidating the assets of collaborationist newspapers outlawed after the Liberation. He was a juror at the trial of Philippe Pétain. Meanwhile, he headed the commission of the National Assembly for the coordination of Muslim affairs. In this capacity, he tried to ameliorate the lot of Algerians and participated in the preparation of the statute of 1947, which was not applied.

In the 1950s and 1960s, he participated in the peace movement.

In 1956 and 1967, he failed to win back his parliamentary seat. He supported de Gaulle's return to power in 1958.

=== Anti-racism activity ===
Jean Pierre-Bloch was also a director of the International League against Anti-Semitism (LICA): he was a member of the executive committee from 1937 to 1968 and then president of the International League against Racism and Anti-Semitism (LICRA) for 24 years, from 1968 to 1992, and finally honorary president from 1992 to his death. He became president of LICA after the death of its founder Bernard Lecache and directed its journal, The Right to Live. It was at his urging that mention of the fight against racism was added to the name of LICA, which became LICRA in 1979. His activism had begun in 1934, when he investigated the pogroms committed at Constantine, Algeria.

From 1987 to 1989, he presided over the Consultative Commission on Human Rights by the side of the Prime Minister.

=== Family ===
Pierre-Bloch had three children with Gabrielle Sadourny: Michèle, Claude Pierre-Bloch, former producer and political adviser and Jean-Pierre Pierre-Bloch, former deputy (UDF-PSD) for Paris and municipal councilor (DL) in the 18th arrondissement. His grandson, David Pierre-Bloch, is a producer and a Nouveau Centre party's member.

=== Awards ===
- Grand Officer of the Legion of Honour
- Knight of the Order of Academic Palms
- Commander of the Order of Public Health
- 1939 War Cross 6 citations
- Resistance Medal with rosette
- Cross of the resistance volunteer combatant
- Escapees' Medal
- Medal of the Supreme Soviet
- Volunteer combatant's cross
- Grand Officer of the National Order of Benin
- Medal of a liberated France
- Grand Cordon of the Order "Nicham Ephticar"
- Silver-gilt Honour Medal of the Local Collectivities
- Cross of Valor (Poland)
- Plaque from the Millennium of the city of Paris

In March 2003, rue Alexis Carrel in Paris was rechristened with Jean Pierre-Bloch's name.

== Bibliography ==
- Jean-Pierre Bloch : Un français du monde entier (Jean-Pierre Bloch : A Frenchman of the Entire World) René Vérard, André Guillard. Édition Corsaire, 1997. 256 p.

ISBN 2-910475-02-6

=== Works ===
- Charles De Gaulle - Premier Ouvrier de France vu par un socialiste (Charles De Gaulle - First Worker of France as Seen by a Socialist) Éditions Fasquelles (Paris), 1945, 115 p.
- Mes jours heureux (My Happy Days) Ed. du Bateau Ivre 1947 294 p.
- Liberté et servitude de la presse en France : morceaux choisis (Freedom and Servitude of the Press in France: Selected Fragments) Éditions du Livre (Monte-Carlo), 1952, 292 p.
- Le vent souffle sur l'histoire. témoignages et documents inédits (The Wind Blows on History. Testimony and Previously Unpublished Documents) Éditions S.I.E.P. 1956. 332 p.
- Khroutchev en France. essai biographique. (Krushchev in France. Biographic essay) Éditions S.I.E.P. 1960, 46pp
- Algérie - Terre des occasions perdues. (Algeria - Land of Lost Chances) Deux Rives, 1961 111 p.
- De Gaulle ou le temps des méprises (De Gaulle or the Time of Contempt) éd. La Table ronde, 1969, 230 pp.
- Jusqu'au dernier jour (To the Last Day) Albin Michel, 1983, 280 p. ISBN 2-226-01920-0
