= Jean Biondi =

French politician (1900–1950)

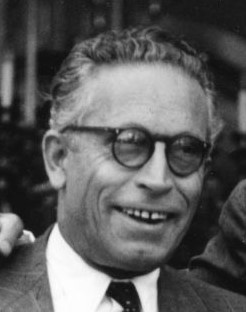
Jean Biondi in 1948

Jean Dominique Biondi (9 May 1900 – 10 November 1950) was a French politician.

== Biography ==
Jean Biondi was born in Sari-d'Orcino, on the island of Corsica. Educated in Ajaccio, the island's capital, and in Paris, he taught at the Lycée Condorcet in the 9th arrondissement of Paris.

Joining the French Section of the Workers' International (SFIO), the French socialist party, he was one of the editors of the Cri populaire de l'Oise, newspaper of the SFIO in the Oise département. He was elected mayor of Creil in 1935 and entered the Chamber of Deputies in 1936 following a by-election in the Oise département. He was re-elected at the general election which followed later in the year, bringing Léon Blum's Popular Front government to power. In 1937 he was appointed to the editorial committee of the SFIO's official journal Le Populaire.

In July 1940, he was one of the 80 who voted against the grant of special powers to Philippe Pétain and the creation of the Vichy régime. As a consequence Biondi was dismissed as mayor of Creil in 1941. The same year he joined the Comité d'action socialiste, the clandestine form of the then-banned SFIO. Arrested in 1942, he was soon released after which he joined the French Resistance in the form of the Brutus Network. Arrested a second time he was held at Fresnes prison, tortured and deported to Mauthausen-Gusen concentration camp and later moved to the Ebensee concentration camp.

Following the end of the Second World War Biondi returned to France. He was awarded the Médaille de la Résistance, the Croix de Guerre and was made a chevalier of the Légion d'honneur. He was elected to the National Assembly, which replaced the pre-war Chamber and the immediately post-war Consultative Assembly, serving as under-secretary to the Minister of the Interior in Léon Blum's third ministry (1946–47) and later as secretary of state under several prime ministers (1947–50), usually with responsibility for the French Civil Service .

In 1950 Biondi died in a car crash near Groslay.
