= Libération-Nord =

French WWII-era resistance movement

Libération-Nord (French pronunciation: [libeʁasjɔ̃ nɔʁ], "Liberation-North") was one of the principal resistance movements in the northern occupied zone of France during the Second World War.

It was one of the eight great networks making up the National Council of the Resistance.

== History ==
Initially an underground newspaper, from December 1940 to November 1941 Libération-Nord was transformed into a resistance movement. Aiming to express the secret movements of the non-communist unions among the Confédération générale du travail the Confédération Française des Travailleurs Chrétiens and the Section française de l'Internationale ouvrière (SFIO), Libération-Nord was formed around Christian Pineau and the team of the Manifeste des douze. The movement was not entirely socialist but the leadership was socialist.

In 1942, two resistance networks were created from within Libération-Nord under the command of the Bureau central de renseignements et d'action:

- Phalanx in the zone Sud, created by Christian Pineau
- Cohors-Asturies in the zone Nord.

In early 1943 Libération-Nord began to organise armed groups under the impetus of Jean Cavaillès and Colonel Zarapoff. Represented at the National Council of the Resistance, where he exerted the influence of the underground SFIO, the movement withheld its participation from the Mouvements unis de la Résistance in December 1943.

With the instar of the Organisation civile et militaire, Libération-Nord failed to create a great workers' party with its origins in the resistance.

== Principal members ==
- Pierre Boursicot
- Jean Aimé Caillau
- Jean Cavaillès
- Michel Collinet
- Jean-Baptiste Daviais
- Paul Rassinier
- Jean Gosset
- René Iché
- Marcel Mérigonde
- Christian Pineau
- Yves Rocard
- Louis Saillant
- François Tanguy-Prigent
- Colonel Zarapoff

== Bibliography ==
- (in French) Alya Aglan, La Résistance sacrifiée. Le mouvement Libération-Nord, Flammarion, 1999 (ISBN 2080676970), nouvelle édition, « Champs », 2006.
- (in French) Christian Pineau, La Simple Vérité. Regard sur la période 1940-1945, Juillard, 1960
- (in French) Marc Sadoun, Les Socialistes sous l'Occupation, Presses de la Fondation nationale des sciences politiques, 1982 (ISBN 2724604601)

== See also ==
- Libération-Sud
