= Franc-Tireur (disambiguation) =

Francs-tireurs were French irregular military formations during the Franco-Prussian War of 1870.

Franc-Tireur may also refer to:

- Franc-Tireur (movement), a French Resistance movement founded in Lyon in 1940 as France Liberté
- Franc-Tireur (newspaper), the official publication of the Franc-Tireur movement
- Les Francs-tireurs, a Quebec television show hosted by Richard Martineau

== See also ==
- Francs-Tireurs et Partisans (FTP, or FTPF), armed French Resistance group created in 1939
- Francs-Tireurs et Partisans de la Main d'Oeuvre Immigrée (FTP-MOI), a resistance group
