= Underground media in German-occupied France =

French history of the Second World War

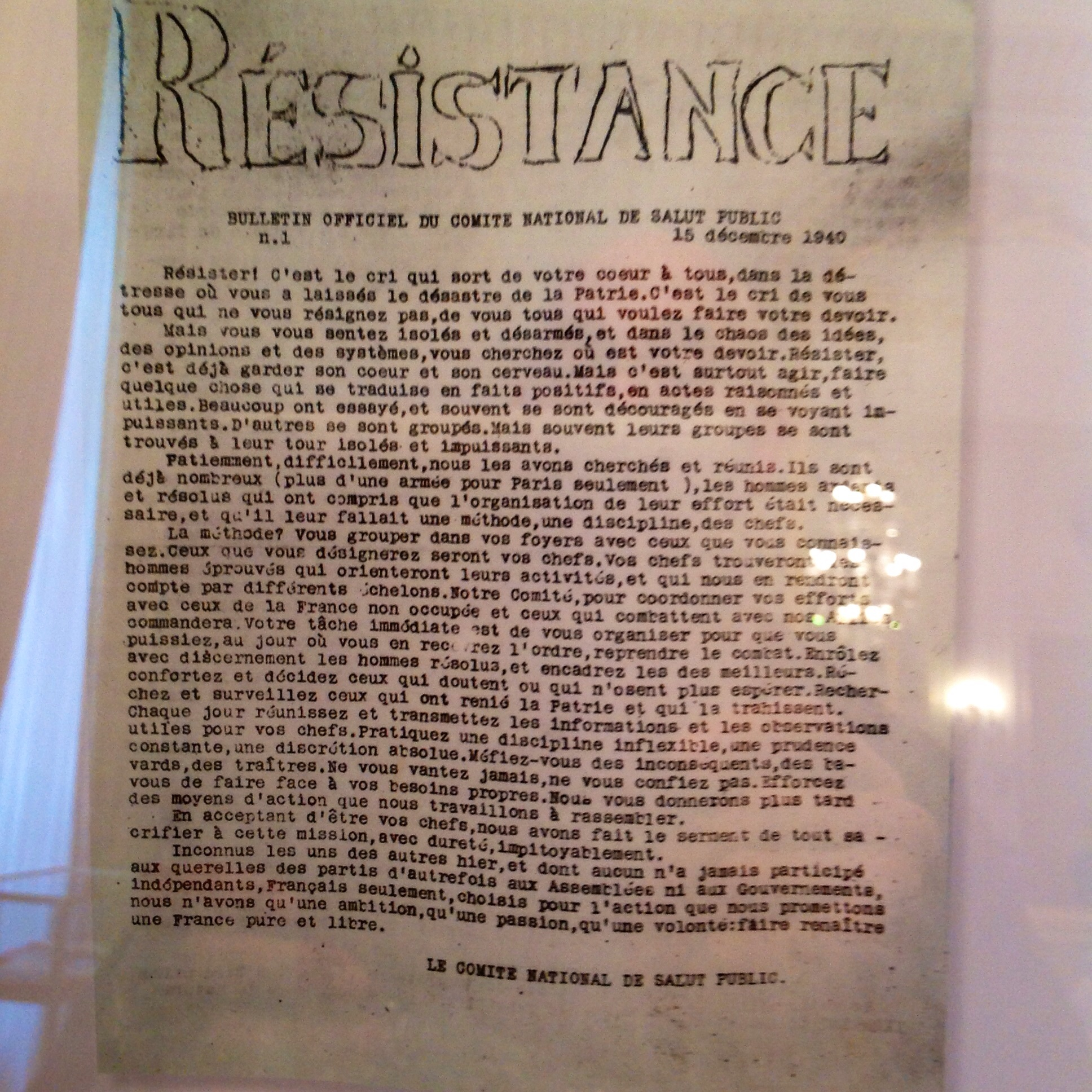
Issue #1 of Résistance, from the Musée de l'Homme group, 15 December 1940

The clandestine press of the French Resistance was collectively responsible for printing flyers, broadsheets, newspapers, and even books in secret in France during the German occupation of France in the Second World War. The secret press was used to disseminate the ideas of the French Resistance in cooperation with the Free French, and played an important role in the liberation of France and in the history of French journalism, particularly during the 1944 Freedom of the Press Ordinances.

== History ==
'France under German occupation

Counterpropaganda such as leaflets, broadsheets (such as the first pages of the Valmy newspaper), brochures, posters, and clandestine newspapers began to appear in France. In September 1941, German police in Paris reported discovering leaflets written in German and co-signed by the Communist Parties of Germany (KPD) and Austria (KPÖ). On 10 July 1942, General Karl Oberg posted a notice in every town hall in the Occupied zone announcing penalties applicable to the families of anyone convicted of disseminating propaganda against the occupying force (writers, typographers, middlemen, distributors), recalling ancient German Sippenhaft-style collective punishment measures. These measures didn't stop the spread of information by the Resistance, and by 1944, 1,200 underground newspaper titles were being published with a total circulation of two million copies, totaling nearly twelve million copies over the course of the war.

The first French underground newspapers emerged in opposition to German and Vichy control over French radio and newspapers. In the German-occupied zone, the first underground titles to emerge were Pantagruel and Libre France, which both began in Paris in October 1940. In Vichy France, the first title to emerge was Liberté in November 1940. Few produced issues for both German and Vichy zones, though Libération was an early exception. In early newspaper issues, individuals often wrote under a number of pseudonyms in the same issue to convey the impression that a team of individuals was working on a newspaper. Initially underground newspapers represented a wide range of political opinions but, by 1944, had generally converged in support of Gaullist Free French in the United Kingdom.

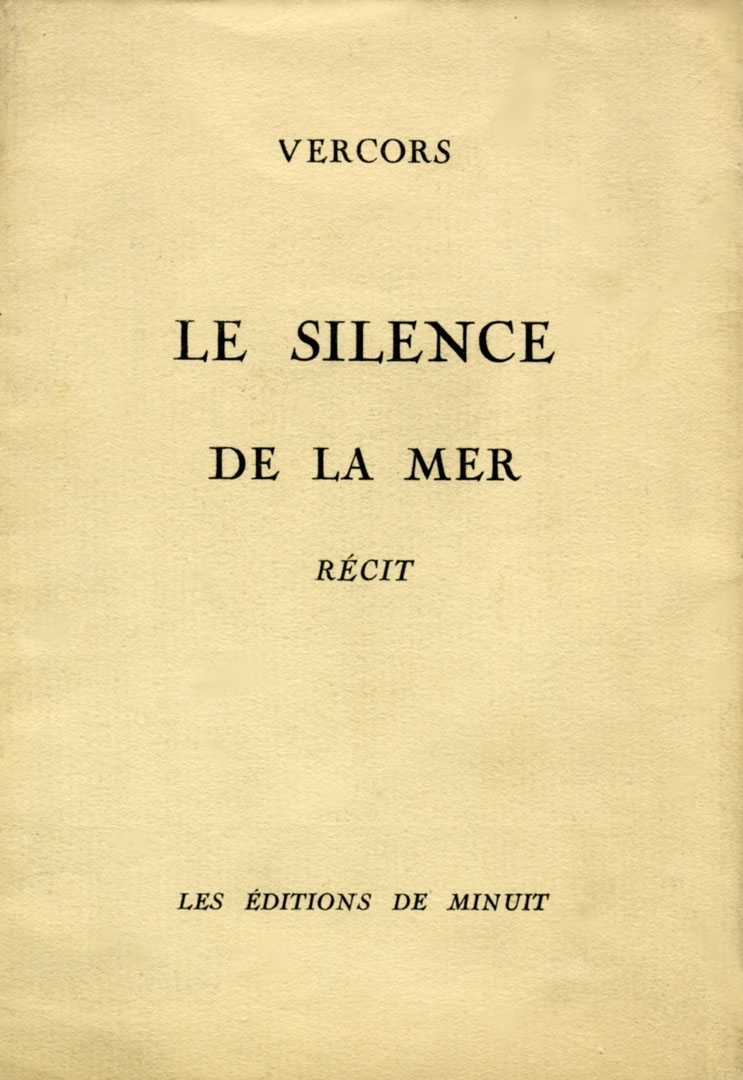
Cover of first edition of Le Silence de la Mer by Jean Bruller (1942)

The four major clandestine newspapers during the German occupation were Défense de la France, Résistance, Combat and Libération. Défense de la France was founded by a group of parisian students in the summer of 1941. After the invasion of the Soviet Union, these were joined by a number of communist publications including L'Humanité and Verité. These newspapers were anti-Nazi propaganda, but practiced propaganda themselves by misreporting events, and glorifying and enlarging Allied victories. The reporting in these newspapers was often subjective, as they aimed to capture and shape public opinion rather than accurately represent it. The extent to which underground newspapers actually affected French popular opinion under the occupation is disputed by historians.

Profession-specific newspapers also existed. Le Médecin Français advised doctors to immediately approve known collaborators for Service du travail obligatoire while medically disqualifying everyone else. La Terre advised farmers on how to send food to resistance members. Bulletin des Chemins de Fer encouraged railroad workers to sabotage German transportation. Unter Uns ("Among Us"), published in German for the occupiers, printed stories of German defeats on the eastern front.

A small number of underground presses were also active in printing illegal books and works of literature. The most notable example of this was Le Silence de la mer by Jean Bruller published illegally in Paris in 1942. This marked its publisher, "Les Éditions de Minuit", as an emerging clandestine publisher of Resistance material; they later became a successful commercial literary publisher in post-war France.

The Bibliothèque nationale de France (BnF) began a project in 2012 to digitise surviving French underground newspapers. By 2015, 1,350 titles had been uploaded on its Gallica platform.

=== Censorship and repression ===
Censorship in France was the enemy of the underground press during the Second World War. Under the German occupation and the laws of the Vichy regime, freedoms of the French people were suppressed, particularly with the end of freedom of the press. The decree-law of 24 August 1939 authorising seizure of newspapers and their suppression as well as the official establishment of censorship on 27 August led to the disappearance of newspapers which had been denouncing the German occupation. The only media that survived under the occupation were ones that served the propaganda needs of the German occupier and of Vichy.

It also spelled the end of freedom of speech, and any citizen caught reading the foreign press or listening to foreign radio were judged as opponents and enemies of the regime.

The occupying force and the police paid particular attention to counterpropaganda printed matter from the outset. One of the first missions of the police was to discover clandestine newspaper printing locations, and their leaders. The first arrests were therefore those of journalists involved in counterpropaganda such as Jean-Baptiste Lebas, who launched "L'homme libre" (The Free Man) and who died after being deported, or Claude Bourdet, director of the clandestine newspaper Combat arrested in March 1944. Out of 1200 workers of the book Resistance fighters 400 were killed (deported, decapitated, shot).

=== Printing and distribution methods ===
In the face of repression, underground newspapers faced many problems with supplies. Paper, ink and typewriters were scarce, expensive and their sale was meticulously controlled. Printing centres were also few and far between and were used for propaganda newspapers.

The first clandestine newspapers were therefore handwritten with very few copies. However, two processes were useful for clandestine production: the "roneo" Gestetner and the spirit duplicator, which was small in size and therefore easy to transport and hide. It was operated by a small crank handle, and could print between 700 and 800 copies per hour.

Everything was done with the utmost secrecy governments and also of people not involved in the clandestine work. The penalties for being involved in the printing and distribution of a resistance newspaper were very strict.

For the delivery and distribution of newspapers, Resistance members assumed the risk of being arrested and imprisoned. From the beginning, railway workers played an essential role in long-distance transport. The bicycle was also one of the best means of transport for delivering printed material. Other means were also used to distribute newspapers, allowing the anonymity of the distributors to be maintained: slipping the issues into letterboxes, under doors, or in a pocket, or dropping them on a bench or table.

In spite of strong repression and censorship nearly 1200 titles totaling over ten million copies of underground newspapers were printed between 1940 and 1944.

=== Radio Londres and the underground press ===
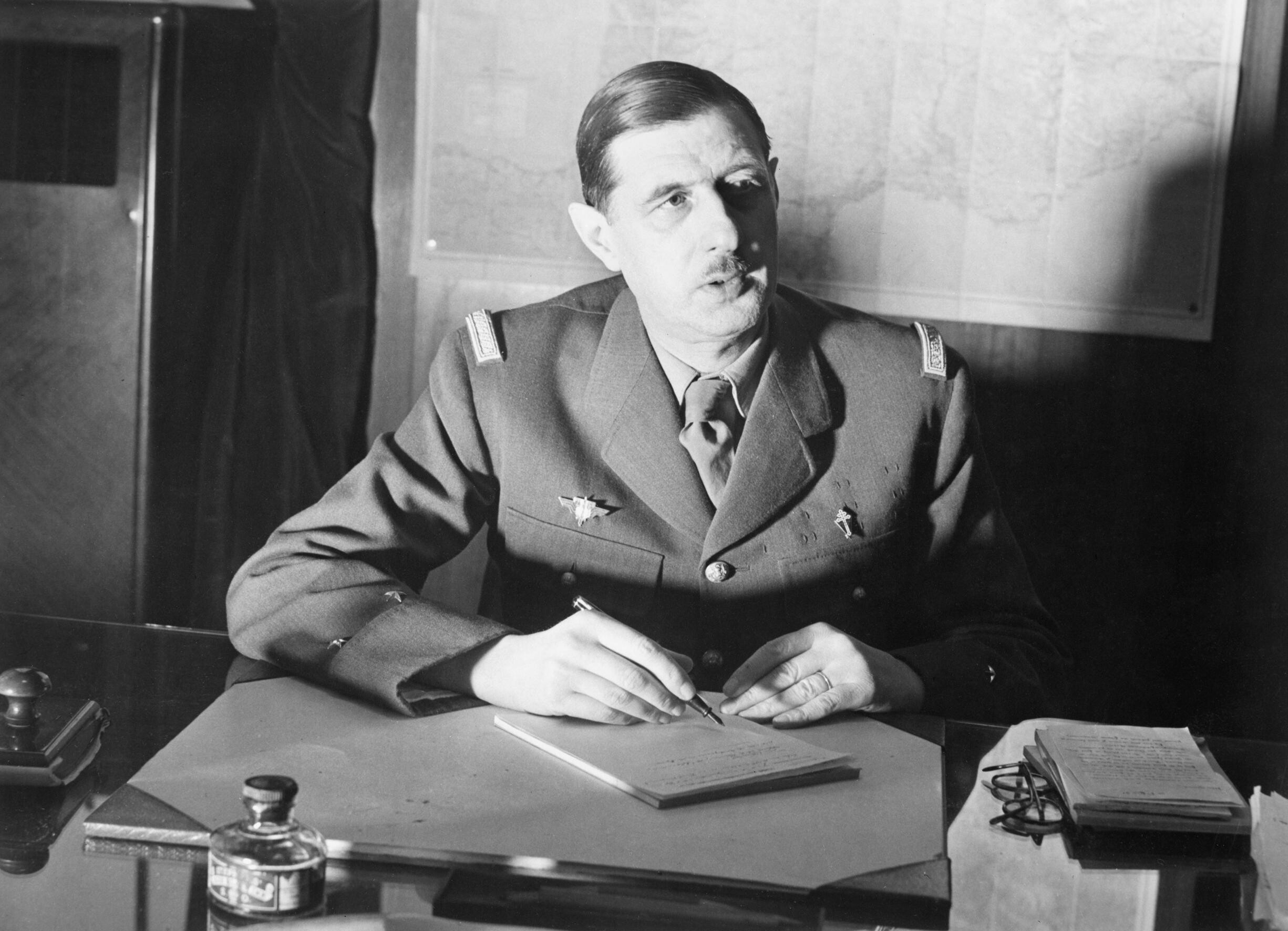
General Charles de Gaulle at his desk in London during the War

After the Fall of France in 1940, the BBC opened its studio to the first members of the Resistance who fled Occupied France. Radio Londres was born and would become the daily rendezvous of the French people for four years. It opened its transmission with, "Ici Londres. Les Français parlent aux Français..." ("This is London. The French speaking to the French...") It was the voice of Free French Forces under Charles de Gaulle, who, on 18 June 1940, made a speech known as Appeal of 18 June, inviting his compatriots to resist the occupation, and rise up against it.

The press was constrained on French territory to considerable supply difficulties and strong political repression. Radio, which broadcast mainly from abroad, was not subject to the same forms of repression. Radio Londres, broadcast by the French section of the BBC seemed better placed to make the voice of the French Resistance heard and to have a psychological influence on the French. Its broadcasts could be listened to both throughout the country and within the homes themselves, but in 1940 there were only five million receivers and the transistor hadn't yet been invented. Moreover, the broadcasts only provided a view of events from the outside, and had limited knowledge of what was happening within French territory.

Radio London and the clandestine newspapers thus had complementary functions in their common objective of bringing as many French people as possible to the Resistance. The radio was able to reach the entirety of the French population, while the press had the mission of fighting directly on the home front until it was able to spread more and more to the territory as a whole.

=== Calling for resistance ===
The content of clandestine newspapers focused exclusively on the motivations and nature of the Resistance struggle, and why it was necessary.

The duty to act is clearly stated in the first issue of Libération of July 1941 which stated that the newspaper per se is an action and that the situation can only be changed "by action and through action". (Note: In French: par l’action et dans l’action. —from the first issue of Libération in July 1941.) Combat followed it by giving in January 1942 "guidelines for action".

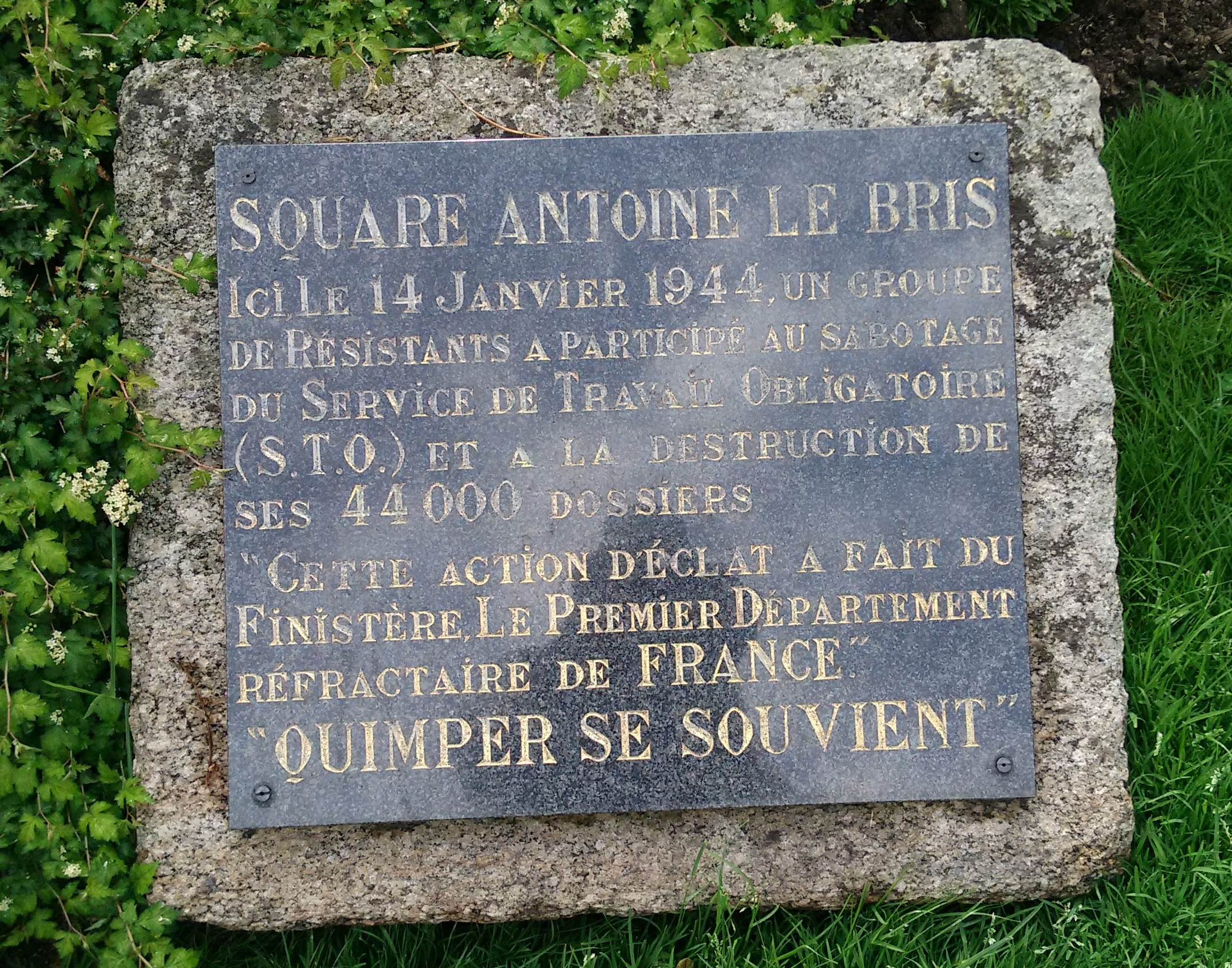
Plaque in Quimper commemorating a January 1944 act of sabotage against the STO office, destroying 44,000 files.

There was only one cause common to all underground newspapers: to appeal to as many French people as possible to join the fight against the occupier, to "chase away the invader" (Note: French: "Chasser l’envahisseur" —Libération, August 1941.) as Libération wrote in August 1941, with the aim of liberating French territory. The first form of action targeted by the underground press was the call to read and circulate copies of the clandestine press. It also encouraged the reader to become a distributor. It was a form of "combat through words", as Combat wrote in December 1941. The situation at the time only allowed for resistance via verbal struggle. "We will take part in the crushing of Germany, even at the risk of our own lives," (Note: French: "Nous participerons à l’écrasement de l’Allemagne fut-ce au péril de nos vies" —August 1941 issue of Les Petites Ailes.) wrote the August 1941 issue of Les Petites Ailes.

The clandestine press worked to counter the ideas of the Vichy regime and Nazis by taking up the key themes of the official propaganda. By 1943, the watchwords of the counterpropaganda struggle taken up by all of the underground press, were opposing the Service du travail obligatoire, the Nazi-imposed obligatory work program, and calling for demonstrations, strikes and sabotage of French-made goods destined for Germany.

== Top-circulation titles ==
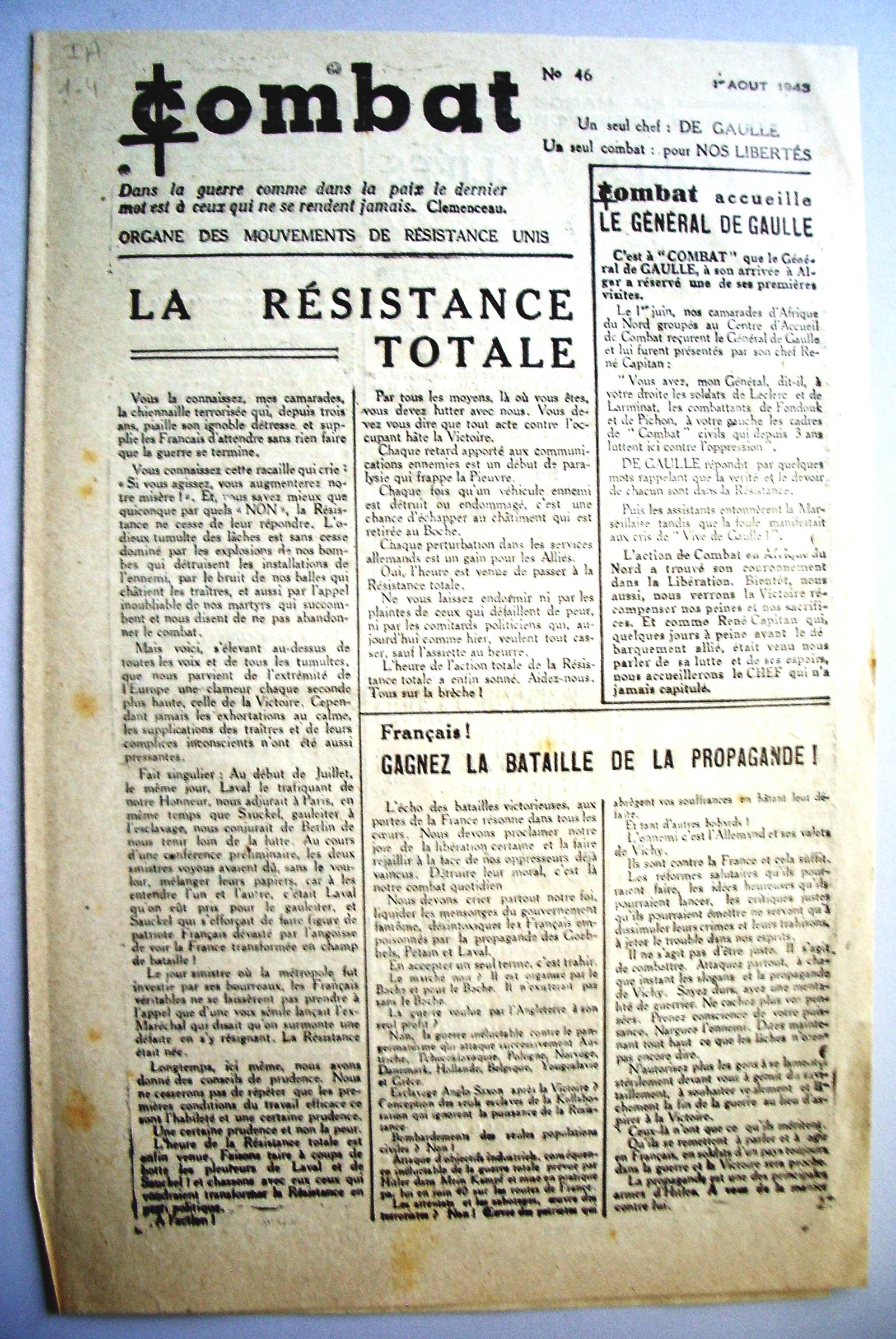
Issue № 46 of Combat of 1 August 1943

=== Combat ===
The Petites Ailes ("Little Wings") appeared in the Forbidden Zone in the Nord-Pas-de-Calais department in northern France. In the Occupied and Free zones, it became known as Les Petites Ailes de France. In August 1941, its title changed: in the northern, Occupied zone, to Résistance; in the southern zone, to Vérités (Truth). The group in the north was destroyed. In the south, during the merger of the National Liberation Movement (1940-41) (MLN) with the Liberty Resistance group, Vérités became Combat, a new newspaper common to all three zones; its title was adopted by the MLN group, thenceforth known as Combat, whose first issue came out in December 1941 under the influence of Bertie Albrecht and Henri Frenay. Production of Combat was directed by André Bollier. Thanks to the structures put in place, circulation reached 1000 copies in 1943, and attained 5,000 with issue number 50 of 1 November 1943. and 30,000 in December 1943.

After the Liberation, Combat was led by Albert Ollivier, Jean Bloch-Michel, Georges Altschuler and especially Pascal Pia, who dragged his friend Albert Camus there in the fall of 1943. Jean-Paul Sartre, André Malraux, Paul Gordeaux and Emmanuel Mounier also contributed, and later Raymond Aron and Pierre Herbart.

=== Défense de la France ===
A few Parisian students decided to found a clandestine newspaper to denounce the occupation of France. Benefiting from the support of industrialists and printers, the young Resistance fighters managed to produce an increasingly professional newspaper which ended up having the highest circulation of any underground paper as of January 1944.

The first issues were printed on a Rotaprint offset press hidden in the cellar of the Sorbonne, to which Hélène Viannay held the key as a volunteer fire fighter, with the following sentence from Blaise Pascal: "I only believe stories whose witnesses would have their throats cut". (Note: I only believe...: "Je ne crois que les histoires dont les témoins se feraient égorger.")

Initially focused on non-violent action, the Resistance segued into armed operations in 1944. Despite setbacks dealt by the German and French police, Défense de la France managed to print both its newspaper and those of other movements until the Liberation.

Among the printers were Pierre Virol, who was arrested in 1944, deported, and died in Lager Ellrich, a subcamp of Mittelbau-Dora concentration camp on 23 January 1945, and his son-in-law Robert, who died 27 December 1944 in the same subcamp. After Liberation, from 8 August on, the paper was printed in Rennes, on the presses of the newspaper Ouest-France, presenting itself as the "evening daily of the National Liberation Movement".

Distributed by the networks Combat and Témoignage chrétien in Grenoble, Clermont-Ferrand, Lyon and Bretagne, Défense de la France became the underground paper with the highest circulation, with 450,000 copies per day as of January 1944.

In March 1944, after multiple moves, the newspaper was housed in a three-story industrial building on rue Jean-Dolent, behind La Santé Prison in the 14th arrondissement of Paris, with "Big Margot", a six-ton "double-jesus" machine, a linotype, a paper cutter, and a supply of paper, gasoline, food, water and two tons of coal for the foundry.

=== Le Franc-Tireur ===
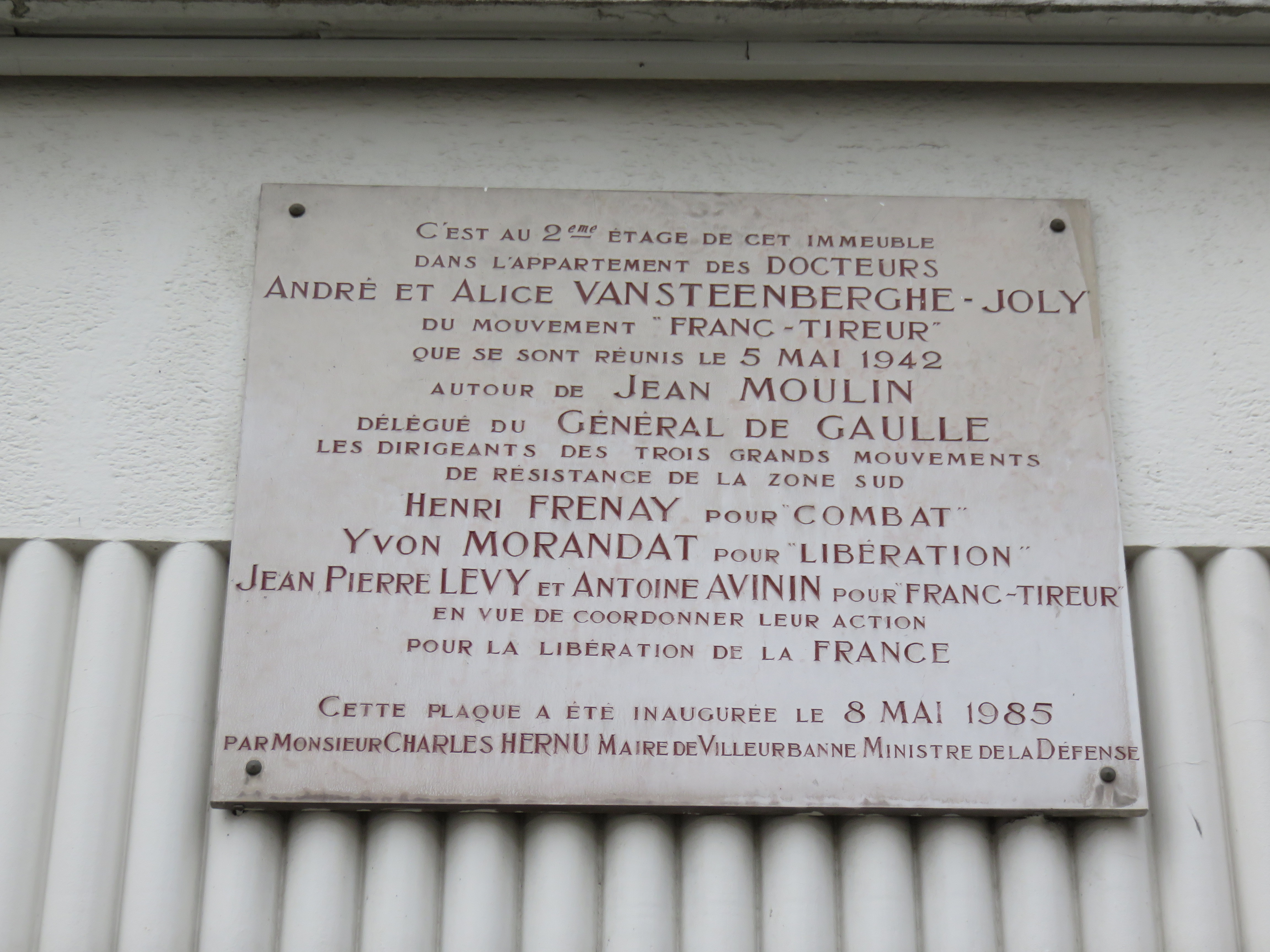
Commemoration of the 5 May 1942 meeting between the Franc-Tireurs André and Alice Vansteenberghe-Joly with Jean Moulin, Henri Frenay, Jean-Pierre Lévy and others.

Franc-Tireur was a movement of the French Resistance founded in Lyon in November 1940 under the name France Liberté, and renamed Franc-Tireur in December 1941.

Le Franc-Tireur is also the name of the movement's underground newspaper, which printed thirty-seven issues between December 1941 and August 1944. (Note: Originally, with a masthead motto of "Organ of the National Liberation Movement, later: "Organ of the Mouvements Unis de la Résistance.") It became one of the chief newspapers of the Resistance, and continued to be published until 1957 after being renamed "Franc-Tireur" at Liberation, with the motto: "In the vanguard of the Republic." From 1957 to 1959, it had the title Paris Journal and then Paris Jour from 1959 to 1972.

Le Mur d'Auvergne, a local paper of the MUR (February. 1944)

The leader of the movement was Jean-Pierre Lévy. Under the aegis of Jean Moulin, the movement merged with Libération-sud and Combat to create the new Mouvements Unis de la Résistance (MUR).

Franc-Tireur is a movement in the southern zone that has the most roots in Lyon. Founded in 1941 by a group of men from various backgrounds, it is a movement of personalities with the same political sensitivity, opposition to the armistice and, from the outset, to the Marshal Pétain himself.

==== Birth of the movement ====
The initiators of the movement met at home or during card games at the Café Moulin joli. The first members were Antoine Avinin, member of the Young Republic League political party and left-wing Catholic, Auguste Pinton, former city councillor, Élie Péju, and Jean-Jacques Soudeille, former communists turned radicals.

They and a few others got together at the end of November 1940 and founded a movement they called "France-Liberté" whose mission was to fight against government propaganda and to mobilize against defeat and the authoritarian order which was taking hold. The group began by writing leaflets against the Nazis and Pétain, which were limited to small numbers of hand-typed copies due to lack of funds.

==== Birth of the paper ====
The group had its first wave of success with the arrival of Jean-Pierre Lévy, an Alsatian refugee who brought a ronéo in the spring of 1941 and launched the idea of expanding its influence by publishing a real newspaper.

With the support of the printer Henri Chevalier, 6000 copies of the first issue were published in December 1941. They were printed on four pages of 21 x 27.5 cm (8 1/2 x 11 inch) format. The title "Franc-Tireur" is an allusion to the groups of volunteers who formed outside the normal military framework to defend their country and the Republic in the Franco-Prussian War. The tone of articles was humorous (the newspaper's ironic subtitle was, "monthly as far as possible, and by the grace of the Marshal's Police". (Note: It's ironic subtitle: "mensuel dans la mesure du possible et par la grâce de la police du Maréchal.") then "monthly in spite of the Gestapo and the Vichy police" (Note: "monthly in spite of...: "mensuel malgré la Gestapo et la police de Vichy") and took an offensive tone against the Marshal and the Germans. The main themes were opposition to the new order and the occupying Germans, denunciation of their misdeeds, and the call to resistance by all people of good will. Issue number one ended with the words, "There is only one task: to resist, to organize.". (Note: One task: "Une seule tâche s'impose : résister, organiser.")

=== L'Humanité ===
On 27 August 1939, the Édouard Daladier government banned publication of L'Humanité after it approved the German-Soviet Pact.

L'Humanité then appeared clandestinely for five years (383 issues of 200,000 copies) and refrained from attacking the Germans until August 1940. Many of its journalists and manufacturing staff perished in the struggle against the Nazi occupier, such as Gabriel Péri (responsible for an international column, shot on 15 December 1941 at the Fort Mont-Valérien, and Lucien Sampaix. The newspaper reappeared openly once more on 21 August 1944, during the Liberation of Paris.

The clandestine issue of 20 May 1941 contained an appeal of the French Communist Party (PCF) concerning the creation of the National Front for the Struggle for the Liberation and Independence of France:

The CP is directed to all those who think French and want to be act their Frenchness... In this National Front for Independence there is room for all French people except for the capitalist dogs and traitors in the service of the invader, so that France may be France and not become a Nazi colony national unity must be achieved... against the invaders and traitors, against the Vichy government which obeys the orders of the German occupiers.

=== National Front publications ===
Page 1 the FN paper Résistance of 25 June 1943 from the Seine-Inférieure department.

The National Front published numerous national and local clandestine newspapers and flyers. From the spring of 1943 to the Liberation, 79 publications were published. In 1944-1945 they published, according to an internal French Communist Party (PCF) source, "Seventeen dailies, one million sales. three weeklies: La Marseillaise (Île-de-France), France d'abord, Action. Five literary weeklies, 35 periodicals (weeklies) in the provinces.".

Among them, were:

- Les Lettres Françaises

Review of French writers assembled in the Comité national des écrivains. Founded in October 1941 by Jacques Decour and Jean Paulhan, 25 issues were published. Les Lettres françaises appeared after Liberation, until 1972.

- L’Université libre (104 issues, from November 1940 o October 1944), headed by Georges Politzer, Jacques Solomon (son-in-law of Paul Langevin) and Jacques Decour;
- Front National, Parisian newspaper, a daily starting in August 1944, directed by Jacques Debû-Bridel;
- Le Patriote du Sud-Ouest, organ of the National Front in Toulouse; a daily at Liberation, its director was then André Wurmser and was among its young coworkers Pierre Gamarra;

They also published books and brochures, such as a book about the Oradour-sur-Glane massacre.

=== Libération ===
The underground paper Libération was the voice of the Resistance movement Libération-Sud. It was launched in July 1941 by Raymond Aubrac and Emmanuel d'Astier de La Vigerie. It became one of the most important and widely distributed of all Resistance newspapers. Libération reappeared openly in regular publication at the Liberation of France in August 1944.

The first published edition of Libération, dated July 1941, resulted in the distribution of over 10,000 copies. In autumn 1942, Jules Meurillon was named in charge of the propaganda and distribution service of the organization and successfully increased the annual circulation of Libération to over 200,000 copies by August 1944.

This paper published by Resistance movement Libération-Sud, is the same paper that was reestablished in 1973 by Jean-Paul Sartre and Serge July.

=== Témoignage chrétien ===
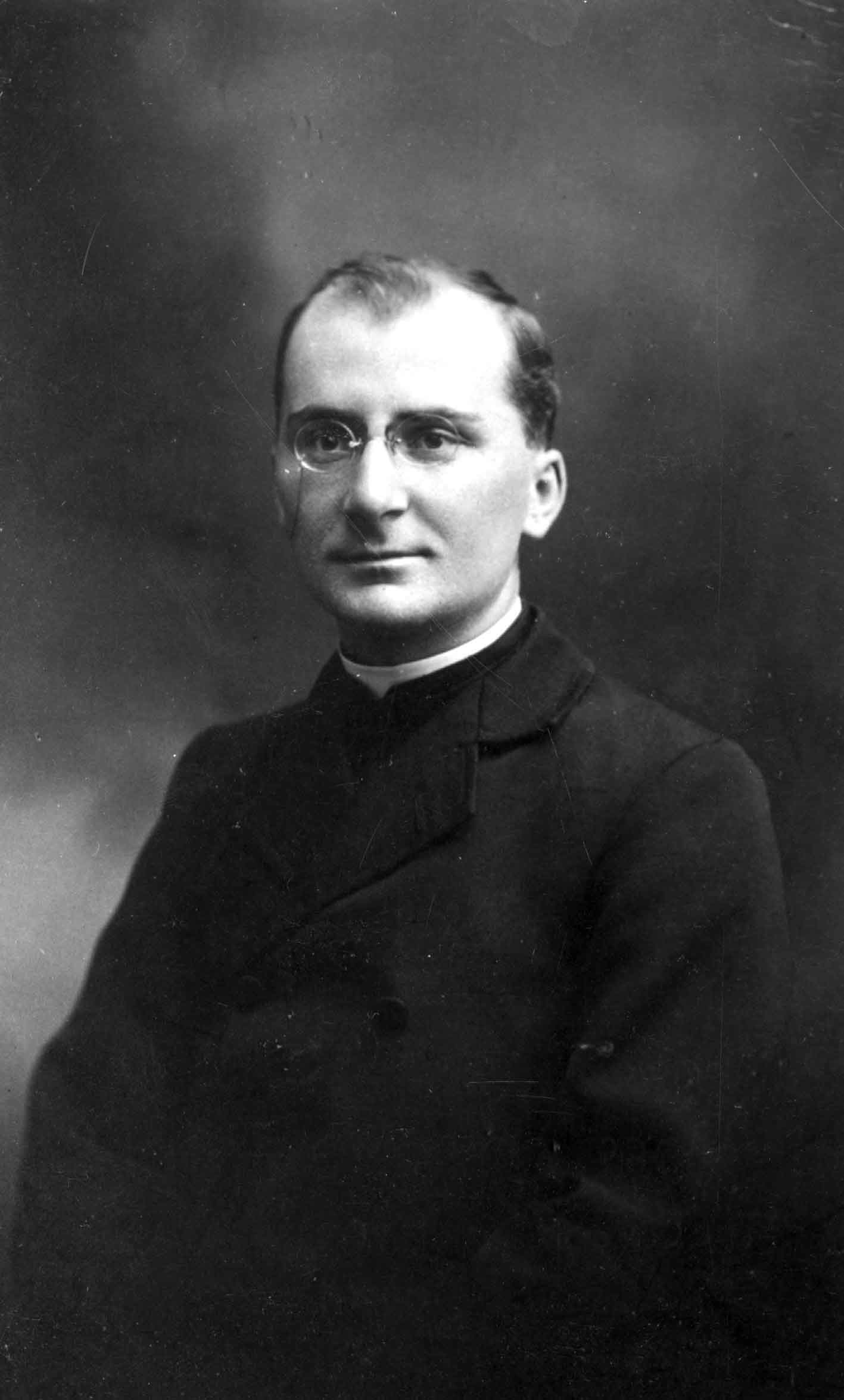
Pierre Chaillet (1900–1972)

On 16 November 1941 in Lyon, Jesuit priest Father Pierre Chaillet secretly published the first Cahier du Témoignage chrétien ("Christian Testimony Notes"). Entitled, "France, beware of losing your soul", (Note: "France prends garde de perdre ton âme") in the form of a small pamphlet (hence the name). It contained a vibrant appeal to oppose Nazism in the name of Christian values. It was entirely written by Father Gaston Fessard. "Christian Testimony" was originally due to be called "Catholic Testimony", but due to ecumenism and following the participation of Protestants in the secret cell initially made up of Jesuits theologians from the Theologate of Fourvière (Lyon), the adjective "Catholic" was changed to "Christian". Parallel to the Cahiers du Témoignage Chrétien, which dealt with a single topic in each issue, there was also the Courrier Français du Témoignage Chrétien (French Christian Testimony Mail) from May 1943, appeared in a print run of 100,000 rising to 200,000 copies.

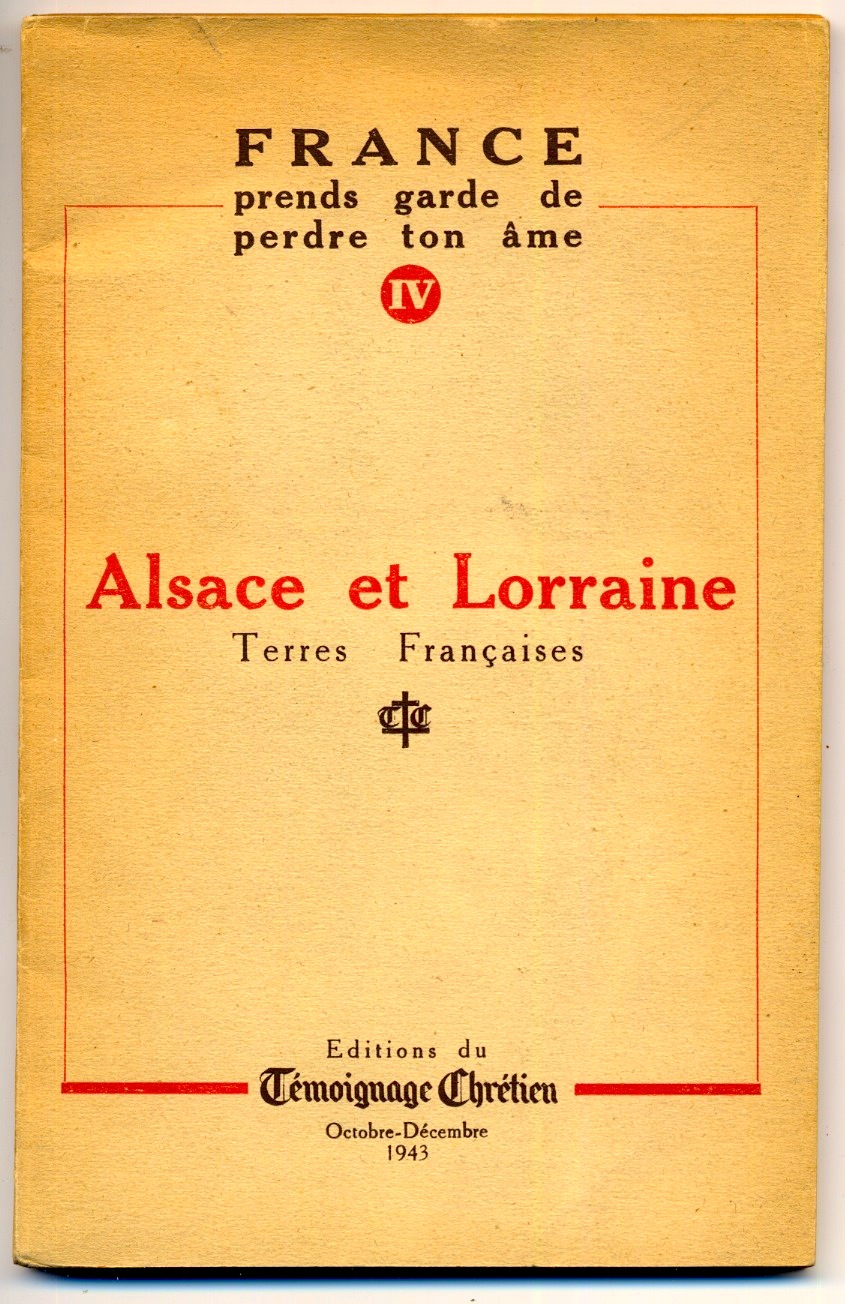
Issue no. 4, October 1943.

The editorial team was headed by Father Pierre Chaillet, and included several Jesuits, especially from the Jesuit theologate of Fourvière in Lyon, including Gaston Fessard and Henri de Lubac, secular priests including Pierre Bockel and Alexandre Glasberg, who were joined by lay persons André Mandouze, Joseph Hours, Robert d'Harcourt. It was printed secretly by a printer from Lyon, Eugène Pons, who ended up deported, and died.

A unique feature of Témoignage Chrétien compared to other Resistance newspapers, was its claim to a spiritual resistance. In fact, the basis for Témoignage Chrétien's opposition to Nazism is the Gospel and Christian ideals. The subtitle of the Témoignage Chrétien is Linking the Front of spiritual resistance against Hitlerism. (Note: "Lien du Front de résistance spirituelle contre l'Hitlérisme.") Thirteen issues of Courrier du Témoignage Chrétien and fourteen of "Cahiers" were distributed before the liberation.

=== La Vie ouvrière ===
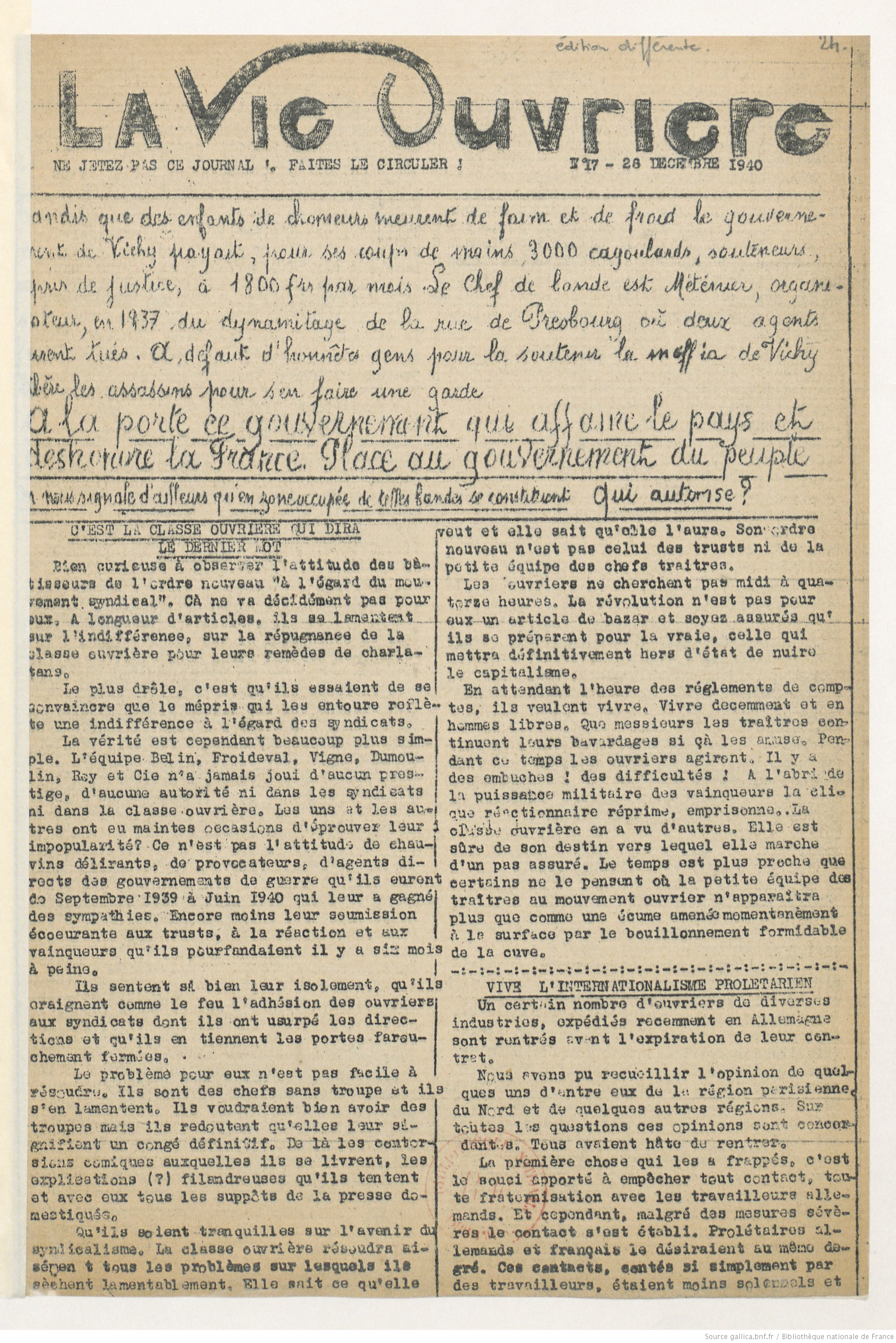
La Vie ouvrière of 28 December 1940

Prohibited from publication in 1939, La Vie ouvrière reappeared as an underground paper in February 1940. In the early days of the occupation, Benoît Frachon, André Tollet, Eugène Hénaff, and a few other union activists from the former United General Confederation of Labor, excluded from the General Confederation of Labor in September 1939, who had escaped the search by the French police, relaunched the newspaper. Two hundred twenty-three issues were published throughout the occupation, focusing on daily life: cost of living, food shortages, supply problems, low salaries, and so on. It called for struggle, union reunification of unions, and fought against internal division. It denounced employers who had largely sunk into collaboration with the occupiers, and reported regularly about the struggles taking place in business.

== Other titles ==
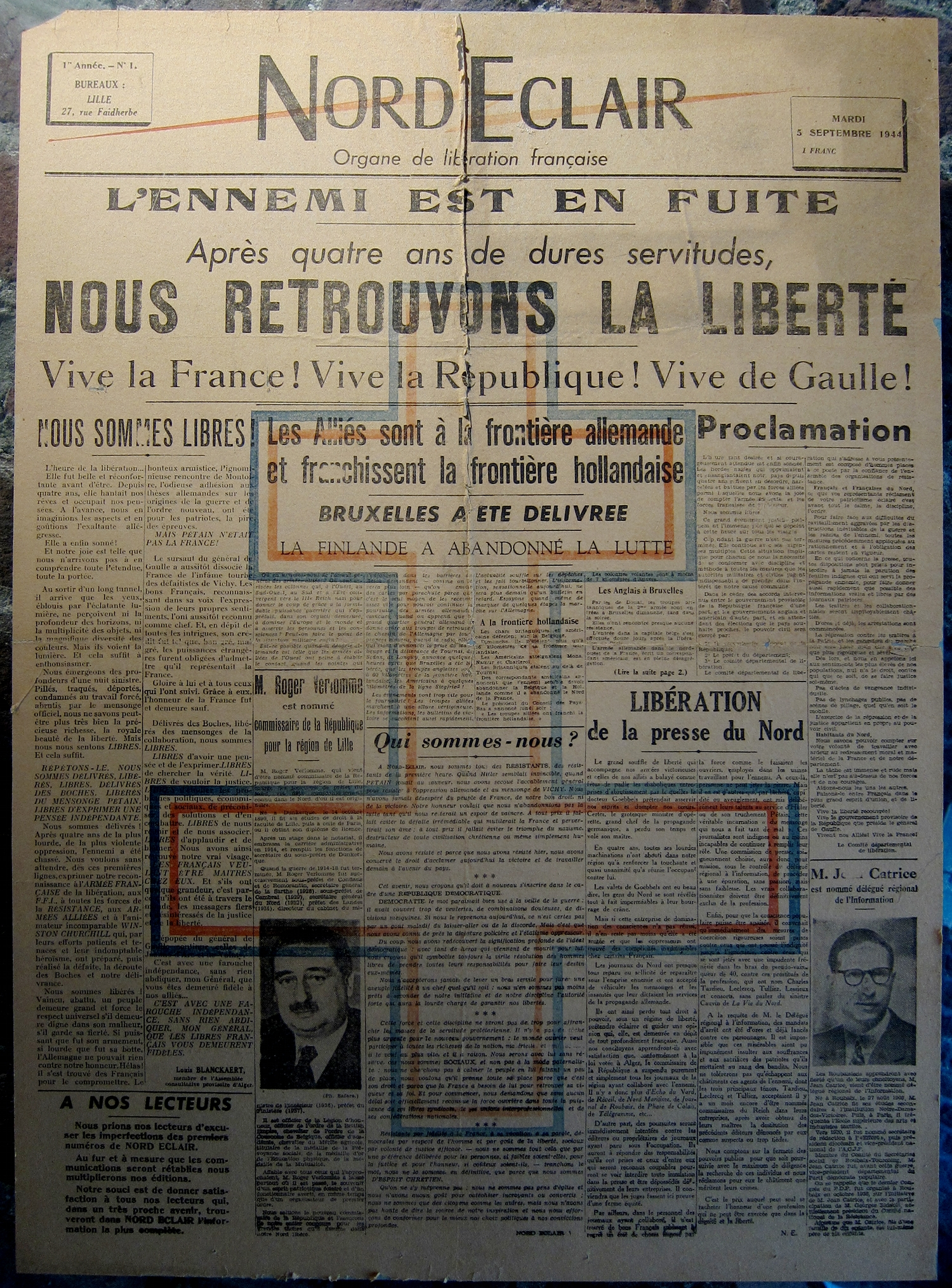
Nord Éclair of 5 September 1944 announcing the liberation of Lille

Others include Arc, which published 20 issues of two- to three hundred copies, the first eight of which were under the name Libre France. It stopped publishing early in 1941.. The underground paper L'Espoir was published in Guérande, in the northwestern part of France, and was published from 13 August 1944 to 10 May 1945, after the local paper, the Presqu'île guérandaise, was forbidden to publish by the German military authorities in March 1944. In issue number one, on 13 August, they ran an editorial about their goals:

This little open flyer shouldn't be called "Hope", but rather, "Liaison agent". Certainly, it brings hope that we will soon be welcoming our liberators, hope that this war, forced upon us by the Germans, will end as soon as possible, but also, it acts as a connection among people, among families, all friends dreaming the same dream. It's the intermediary that will bring you the voice broadcast by Radio London." (Note: From the editorial in the Presqu'île guérandaise: Ce n'est pas l'espoir que ce petit pli ouvert devrait se nommer, mais Agent de liaison. Certes, il porte l'espoir que bientôt nous accueillerons nos libérateurs, espoir que cette guerre, imposée par les Allemands, va finir au plus tôt, mais aussi, agent de liaison entre les hommes, les familles, les amis rêvant d'un même idéal. C'est l'agent de liaison qui vous apporte la voix émise par radio Londres.)

— "Éditorial", La Presqu'île guérandaise (13 August 1944)

On 7 May 1945, they published a "special victory edition", and the next day, they ran a story about the joy in Guérande after they learned of the liberation the day before at 4:30 pm. The last issue came out 10 May 1945 after the electricity came back on, once again allowing the populace to hear the news live from Radio London, and no longer needing to read a printed account of what the radio had broadcast the day before.

== Fiction publishing ==
A small number of underground presses were also active in printing illegal books and works of literature. The most notable example of this was Le Silence de la mer by Jean Bruller published illegally in Paris in 1942. Its publisher, "Les Éditions de Minuit", became a successful commercial literary publisher in post-war France.

== See also ==
- Brazzaville Conference
- Allies of World War II
- Foreign policy of Charles de Gaulle
- Foreign relations of Vichy France
- Free France
- French Fourth Republic
- French Third Republic
- Military Administration in France
- German occupation of France during World War II
- Arbeiter und Soldat
- Les Lettres Françaises
- La Voix du Nord
- Provisional Government of the French Republic
- Underground media in German-occupied Europe
- World War II censorship in France

See also the French category Journal clandestin de la Résistance française
