= John Mentha =

French footballer (1893–1974)

Personal information
- Full name: John Ulysse Mentha
- Date of birth: 26 January 1893
- Place of birth: Colombier, Neuchâtel, France
- Date of death: 9 June 1974 (aged 81)
- Place of death: Mont-de-Marsan, France
- Position: Defender

Senior career*
Years	Team	Apps	(Gls)
1918–1919	CASG Paris		
- * Club domestic league appearances and goals

John Ulysse Mentha (26 January 1893 – 9 June 1974) was a French resistance fighter and footballer who played as a defender for CASG Paris in the late 1910s.

== Playing career ==
Born to Swiss parents on 26 January 1893 in Colombier, Neuchâtel, John Mentha worked as an insurer, and thus, he joined CASG Paris, which was the club of the bank Société Générale, where he eventually established himself as the team's captain.

During the 1918–19 season, the 25-year-old Mentha led his side in the second edition of the Coupe de France; in the semifinals against Stade Rennais at Roazhon Park on 2 February, he helped his side to a 4–3 victory, with the local press describing him as "the personification of consistency". Two months later, on 6 April, he started in the final against the defending champions Olympique de Pantin at the Parc des Princes, where together with Jean Boyer, Louis Hatzfeld, and Émilien Devic, he helped CASG achieve a 3–2 victory after extra-time, thus becoming only the second captain to lift a Coupe de France trophy. The following day, the journalists of French newspaper L'Auto (the forerunner of L'Équipe) stated that CASG's defensive pair of "Frizon-Mentha is one of the best in France".

== Later life ==
In the fall of 1941, during the Second World War, Mentha, then working as an insurance agent in Toulon, was tasked by the resistance leader Jean-Pierre Lévy with organizing the southern region (R2 region), and soon Lévy designated him as the regional leader of the movement, thus becoming one of the core members of the local Franc-Tireur network.

== Death ==
Mentha died in Mont-de-Marsan on 9 June 1974, at the age of 81.

== Honours ==
CASG Paris

- Coupe de France:
  - Champions (1): 1918–19
