= Peju =

Peju or Péju is a given name and surname. Notable people with the name include:

- Peju Alatise (born 1975), Nigerian artist, writer and poet
- Peju Layiwola, Nigerian artist, sculptor and academic
- Peju Ogunmola, Actress
- Élie Péju
- Pierre Péju, French philosopher, novelist and essayist
