= National Council of the Resistance =

Administrative organ of the French Resistance

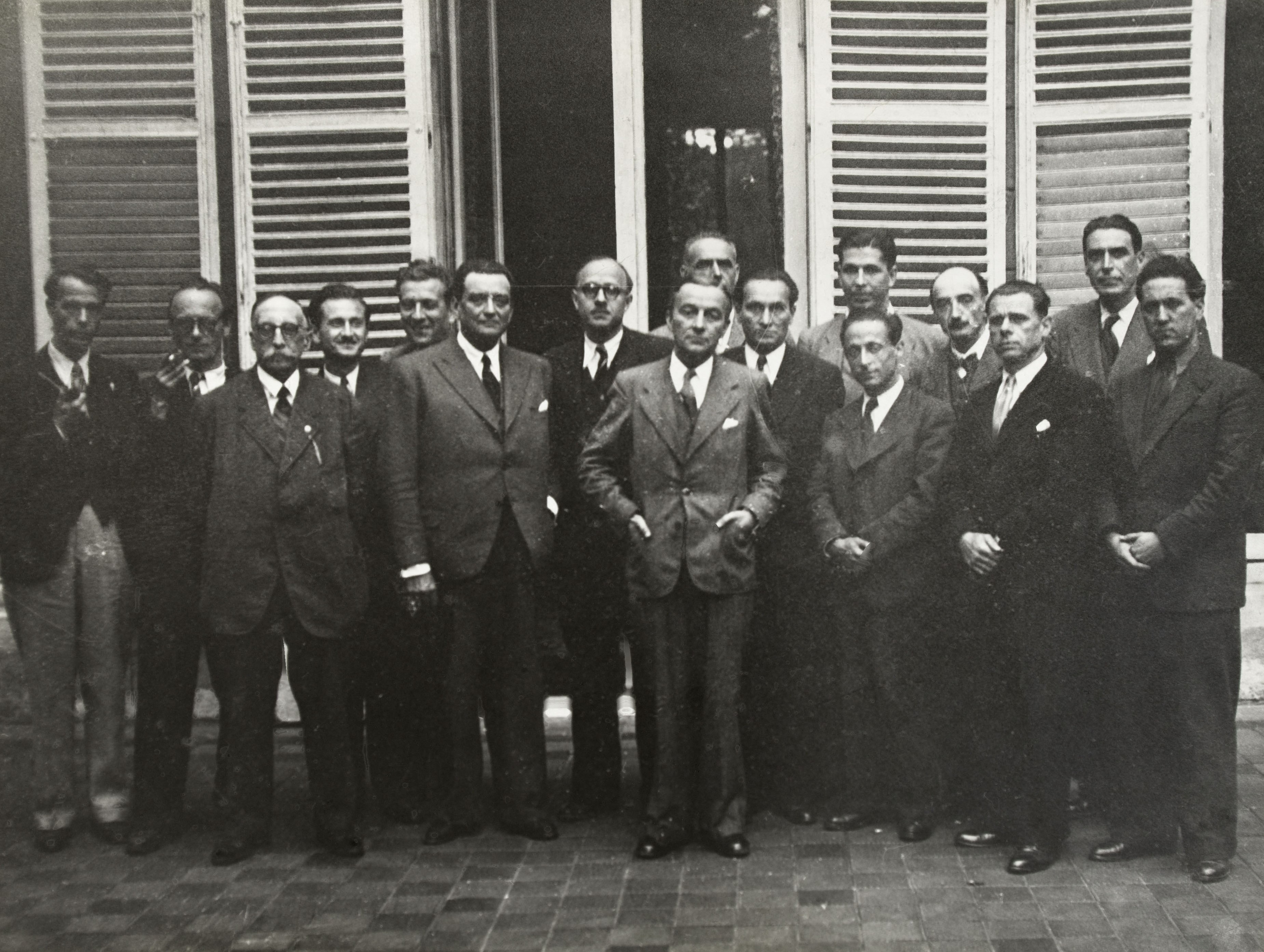
Members of the CNR after the Liberation of Paris, September 1944. From left to right: Jacques Debû-Bridel (FR), Pierre Villon (FN), Gaston Tessier (CFTC), Robert Chambeiron (deputy secretary-general), Pascal Copeau (Libération-Sud), Joseph Laniel (AD), Jacques Lecomte-Boinet (CDLR), Georges Bidault (president), André Mutter, Henri Ribière (Libération-Nord), Daniel Mayer (SFIO), Jean-Pierre Lévy (Franc-Tireur), Paul Bastid (PR), Auguste Gillot (PCF), Pierre Meunier (secretary-general) and Louis Saillant (CGT)

The National Council of the Resistance (French: Conseil National de la Résistance [kɔ̃sɛj nasjɔnal də la ʁezistɑ̃s]; CNR; also, National Resistance Council) directed and coordinated the different movements of the French Resistance during World War II: the press, trade unions and political parties hostile to the Vichy regime, starting from mid-1943.

== Background ==
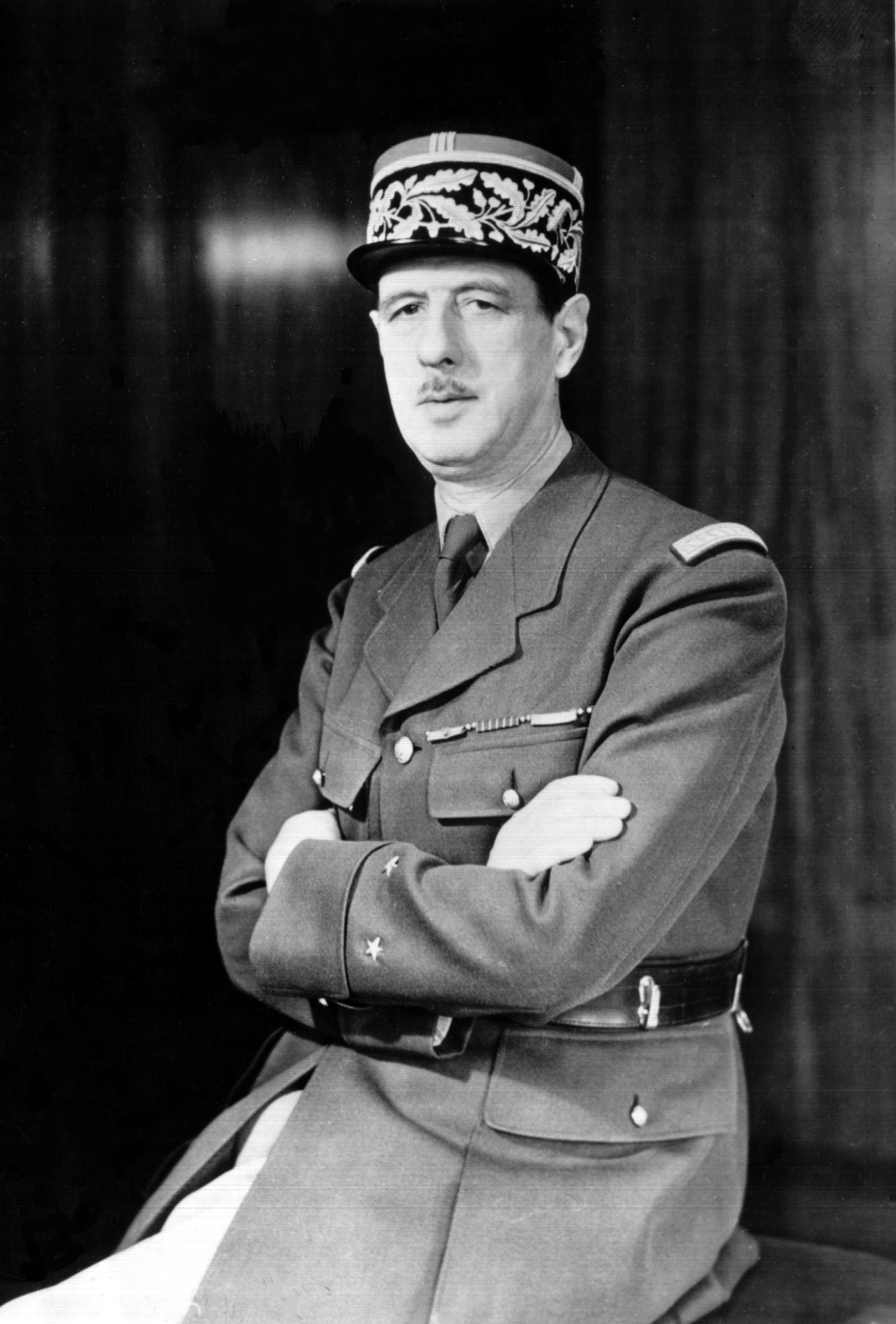
Charles de Gaulle, circa 1942

Various resistance movements had arisen in France since the start of the German occupation in June 1940. With the possible exception of the Francs-Tireurs et Partisans and other groups loyal to the Communist Party of France, the maquis groups were mostly unorganised and unrelated to one another. This lack of coordination made them less effective in their actions against the Nazi occupiers.

== Founding ==
Charles de Gaulle, exiled in London and recognized by the UK as leader of Free France, began forming a committee to unify the resistance movements. On 1 January 1942 he delegated this task to Jean Moulin. Moulin achieved the feat on 27 May 1943 with the first meeting of the Conseil National de la Résistance in the apartment of René Corbin on the second floor of 48, Rue du Four, in Paris.

Aside from Moulin and his two assistants, Pierre Meunier and Robert Chambeiron, representatives of the eight main French resistance movements, members of six of France's major political parties and the two large pre-war trade unions all attended the Rue du Four meeting.

Representatives of the eight major resistance movements:

- Pierre Villon (Front National)
- Roger Coquoin (Ceux de la Libération)
- Jacques Lecompte-Boinet (Ceux de la Résistance)
- Charles Laurent (Libération-Nord)
- Pascal Copeau (Libération-Sud)
- Jacques-Henri Simon (Organisation Civile et Militaire)
- Claude Bourdet (Combat)
- Eugène Claudius-Petit (Franc-Tireur)

Under Jean Moulin's earlier influence, Combat, Franc-Tireur and Libération-Sud had already agreed to regroup themselves in January 1943 to create the Mouvements Unis de la Résistance, with their joint military arms forming the Armée secrète (Secret Army).

Representatives of the two trade unions which had been outlawed with the creation of the Labour Charter of the 4th of October:

- Louis Saillant (Confédération générale du travail)
- Gaston Tessier (Confédération Française des Travailleurs Chrétiens)

Representatives of the six main political parties of the French Third Republic:

- André Mercier (French Communist Party or PCF)
- André Le Troquer (French Section of the Workers' International)
- Marc Rucart (Radical-Socialists)
- Georges Bidault (Parti démocrate populaire)
- Joseph Laniel (l'Alliance Démocratique)
- Jacques Debu-Bridel (Fédération républicaine)

== Arrest of Jean Moulin ==
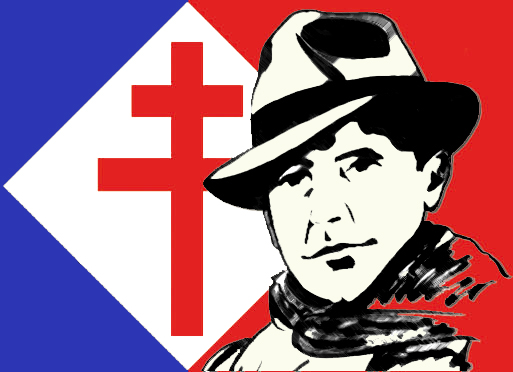
Drawing of Jean Moulin based on iconic photo with hat and scarf, cross of Lorraine in background

However, shortly after the CNR's creation, its president Jean Moulin was arrested at Caluire by the SS. Over the next three days, Moulin was tortured by Klaus Barbie himself, and died during his transfer to Germany. He divulged no information to his torturers and his silence likely allowed the CNR to pursue its activities.

After Moulin's capture and death, the Conseil National de la Résistance decided for security reasons to end its plenary sessions and created an executive office of five members, with each member representing his own group and two others. The new office was under the direction of Alexandre Parodi, delegate-general, and Georges Bidault, the new president. On 9 September 1944 Louis Saillant succeeded Bidault as head of the CNR.

== Programme ==
On 15 March 1944 the CNR adopted, after months of negotiations, the Programme of the Conseil National de la Résistance. The document was strongly influenced by communist groups like the Front National, especially in part II, "Measures to be taken immediately after the liberation of the territory", which envisioned the establishment of a social democracy with a planned economy in France after liberation. Some of the proposed measures were applied, at least to a certain extent, after liberation, including the nationalisation of energy (Électricité de France was founded in 1946), insurance companies (AGF in 1945) and banks (Crédit Lyonnais in 1945, Société Générale in 1946), the creation of social security programs and the independence of trade unions. They are many of the so-called acquis sociaux (social rights) of the second half of the 20th century in France.
