= Élie Péju =

- Born: 16 February 1901; Porcieu-Amblagnieu
- Died: 29 July 1969 (aged 68); Bron
- Occupations: Journalist, French Resistance fighter
- Political party: French Communist Party

Élie Péju (16 February 1901 – 29 July 1969) was a French left-wing political activist based in Lyon and a member of the French Resistance during the Second World War. Élie Péju co-founded the resistance organization Franc-Tireur and directed the Franc-Tireur newspaper from 1944 to 1957. He was awarded as a Companion of Liberation for his role in the Resistance.

== Biography ==
Elie Péju started as an employee in the Berliet automobile factory in Lyon in 1916. After the First World War he gets involved in politics and joins the Young Socialist Movement.

Péju was in favor of joining the Communist International. After the Tour Congress of 1920 and the creation of the soon-to-be French Communist Party, Péju he led the Jeunesse Communiste around Lyon, a youth organization close to the Communist Party. Then, he started working for a cooperative company run by his father-in-law, also a communist activist.

From 1923, he grew closer ideologically to the ideas of the communist activist Boris Souvarine, and contributed to Souvarine's Communist Bulletin. Péju was eventually expelled from the French Communist Party in 1926, and led a dissident communist group in Lyon.

When the Nazi occupied France, Élie Péju got involved in the French Resistance against the occupation. Along with other communist he had met in the 1920s, Auguste Pinton, Antoine Avinin and Jean-Jacques Soudeille, he created a secret resistance organization : "France-Liberté" ; which would later be behind the rise of the Franc-Tireur organization.

Péju was a major writer for the underground newspaper Franc-Tireur, under the fake name Jules Charbonnier. The transport company he had founded after his expulsion from the French Communist Party served for his Resistance network.

From 1942, he took charge of the publishing and distributing of newspaper Le Père Duchêne edited by fellow resistance fighter Georges Altman, as well as La Revue Libre, a newspaper founded by historian and résistant Marc Bloch.

After Franc-Tireur was integrated into the Mouvements unis de la Résistance (en : Unified Resistance Movements) he became the organization's national delegate, succeeding Jean-Pierre Lévy as head of the movement.

During the Liberation of France, Élie Péjue played an active role in transforming the underground newspaper Franc-Tireur into a major Parisian daily newspaper. The first official issue was published on August 24, 1944. In 1948 he became director after part of the Franc-Tireur editorial team left to join another newspaper : Libération.

In 1957 the newspaper was bought by business man Cino Del Duca and transformed into Paris-Journal. Péju left the editorial board, and devoted himself to his bookshop "La Proue" back in Lyon, which he had founded with one of his sons, Georges. He also was chairman and CEO to the Société des Éditions Cinématographiques.

Élie Péju was married to the father of Marcel Péju, an anti-colonialist activist and secretary-general of the journal Les Temps modernes, and the grandfather of the novelist Pierre Péju.

== Medals ==
- Officier de la Légion d'honneur
- Compagnon de la Libération
- Croix de Guerre 1939–1945
- Médaille de la Résistance française avec rosette

== Selected publications ==
- Isabelle von Bueltzingsloewen; Laurent Douzou; Jean-Dominique Durand; Hervé Joly; Jean Solchany (2016). Lyon dans la Seconde guerre mondiale. Histoire (in French). Rennes: Presses universitaires de Rennes. p. 361. ISBN 978-2-7535-4359-1. L2GM..
- Laurent Douzou, « La Résistance à Lyon (1940-1944) », dans Lyon dans la Seconde guerre mondiale, 2016, p. 271-281.
- Marc Bergère, « Péju, Élie », dans François Marcot (dir.), Dictionnaire historique de la Résistance, Paris, Robert Laffont, 2006 (ISBN 978-2-221-09997-1), p. 498-499.
- « Élie Péju », dans Vladimir Trouplin, Dictionnaire des Compagnons de la Libération, Bordeaux, Elytis, 2010.
- Jean-Christophe Notin (2000). 1061 Compagnons (in French). Paris: Perrin. ISBN 2-262-01606-2..
