= Jean-Pierre Lévy (resistance leader) =

French industrialist and resistance leader (1911-1996)

- Born: 28 May 1911; Strasbourg, Alsace
- Died: 15 December 1996 (aged 85); Paris, France
- Occupations: French resistance leader; Industrialist
- Organisation(s): Franc-Tireur, Mouvements unis de la Résistance
- Movement: Political
- Awards: Grand officer of the Ordre national du Mérite; Officer of the order of Agricultural Merit; Commander of the Ordre du Mérite commercial et industriel; Commander of the Ordre du Mérite artisanal

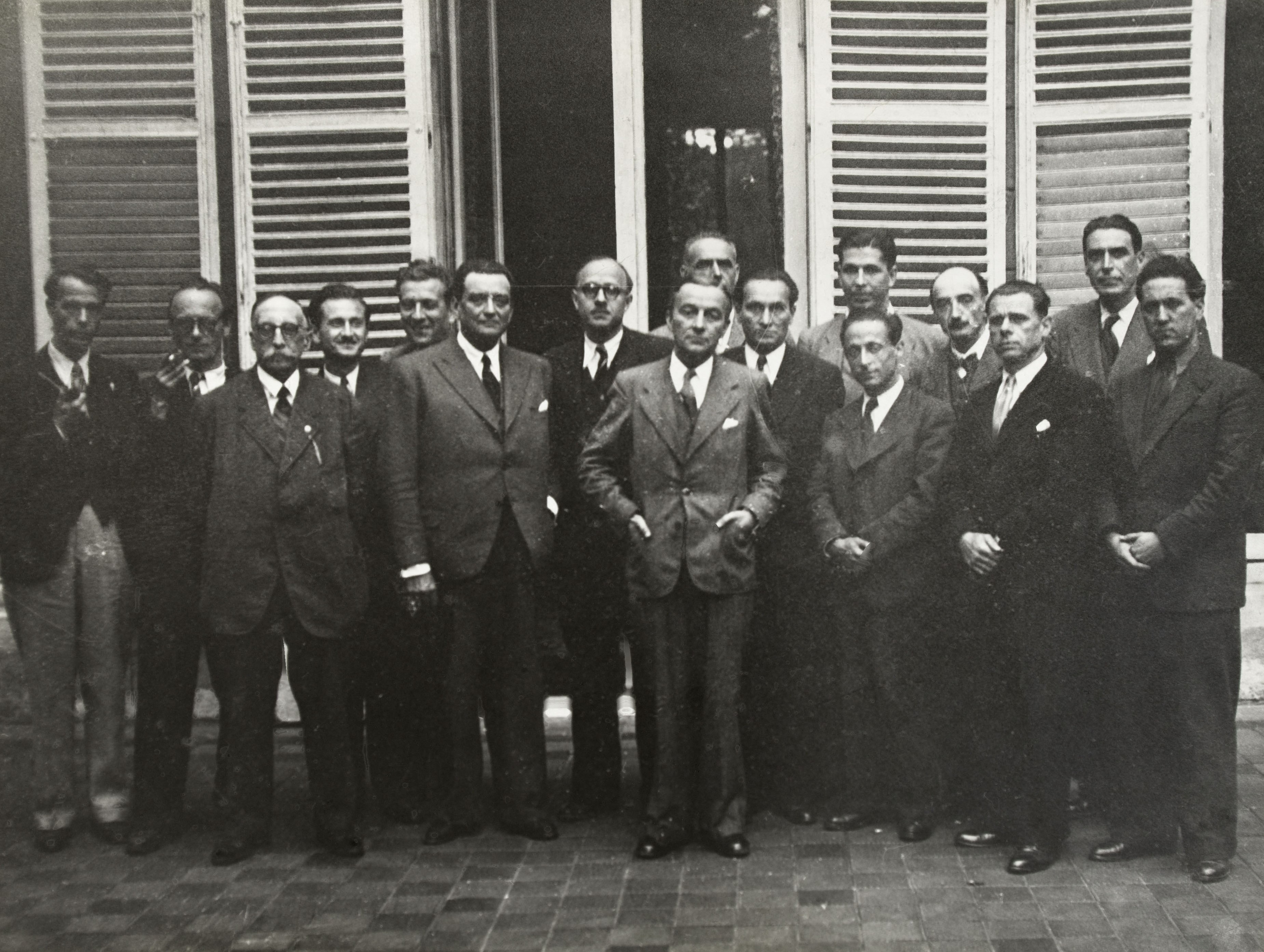
Lévy (third from right at back) with other members of the National Council of the Resistance in September 1944

Jean-Pierre Lévy (28 May 1911 – 15 December 1996) was a French Jewish industrialist and Second World War resistance leader. He worked in the textile industry before being called up as a reserve officer ahead of the war. After the fall of France Lévy joined the resistance and in 1941 co-founded the Franc-Tireur movement. He led the organisation and edited its newspaper. After meeting with Jean Moulin he agreed to help co-ordinate resistance movements in France and went on to join the directorate of the Mouvements unis de la Résistance (MUR). Lévy left France in April 1943 to meet resistance leaders and Charles de Gaulle in London and Algiers. He returned in July and was arrested in October. Lévy was freed by a MUR raid and joined the National Council of the Resistance. He was present at the August 1944 liberation of Paris.

After the war Levy held several business roles in the textile and coal industries and for Renault. He was president of the HEC Paris business school and administrator of the National Forests Office. Lévy remained committed to the cause of resistance fighters and was a member of the council of the Order of Liberation and the founding vice-president of Revivre. He went on to be administrator of SOS Children's Villages in France and the Center of Contemporary Jewish Documentation. Lévy also served on the central committee of the International League Against Racism and Anti-Semitism.

== Early life ==
Lévy, who was Jewish, was born in Strasbourg, Alsace, on 28 May 1911. Strasbourg had been under French control since 1681 but transferred to Prussia (and then to the German Empire) after the 1870–71 Franco-Prussian War. During Lévy's childhood the city passed back to France following the 1914–18 First World War.

Lévy's father was a merchant and had his son educated at Strasbourg's Institute of Commercial Education. He was called up for compulsory military service in 1930, attending the reserve officer cadet school at Poitiers. Lévy afterwards worked in sales and progressed to an executive role in the textile industry. As tensions rose in Europe ahead of the Second World War, Lévy was mobilised into the French Army.

== Second World War ==
France was invaded by German forces on 10 May 1940 and surrendered on 22 June, with Strasbourg again being annexed to Germany. The Germans established Vichy France as a client state in the south of the country and occupied the north. Vichy France maintained an army but Lévy was demobilised in August 1940.

By September 1940 Lévy had become involved in resistance against the German and Vichy forces and by January 1941 was writing and distributing anti-German pamphlets. That year he co-founded the Franc-Tireur movement alongside Antoine Avinin, Noël Clavier, Auguste Pinton, Élie Péju and Jean-Jacques Soudeille. Lévy became the movement's leader and organised it into sections for intelligence, parachuting and fighting and established social services for local residents. Lévy and the movement's members tended to be anti-clerical and many were also members of the Human Rights League.

Lévy was arrested on 15 October 1941 after one of Franc-Tireur's agents in Clermont-Ferrand inadvertently breached secrecy, he was released without charge. After seeing resistance-produced newspapers in Marseilles, Lévy established Franc-Tireur as his movement's newspaper in December 1941 and became its editor. At its height in August 1944, 150,000 copies of Franc-Tireur were being produced. In his early thirties, Lévy was young for a resistance leader in France and was 24 years junior to his sub-ordinate Marc Bloch. According to Levy's memoir, the Free French intelligence service Bureau Central de Renseignements et d'Action experimented with dyeing his hair grey to give him a more mature look.

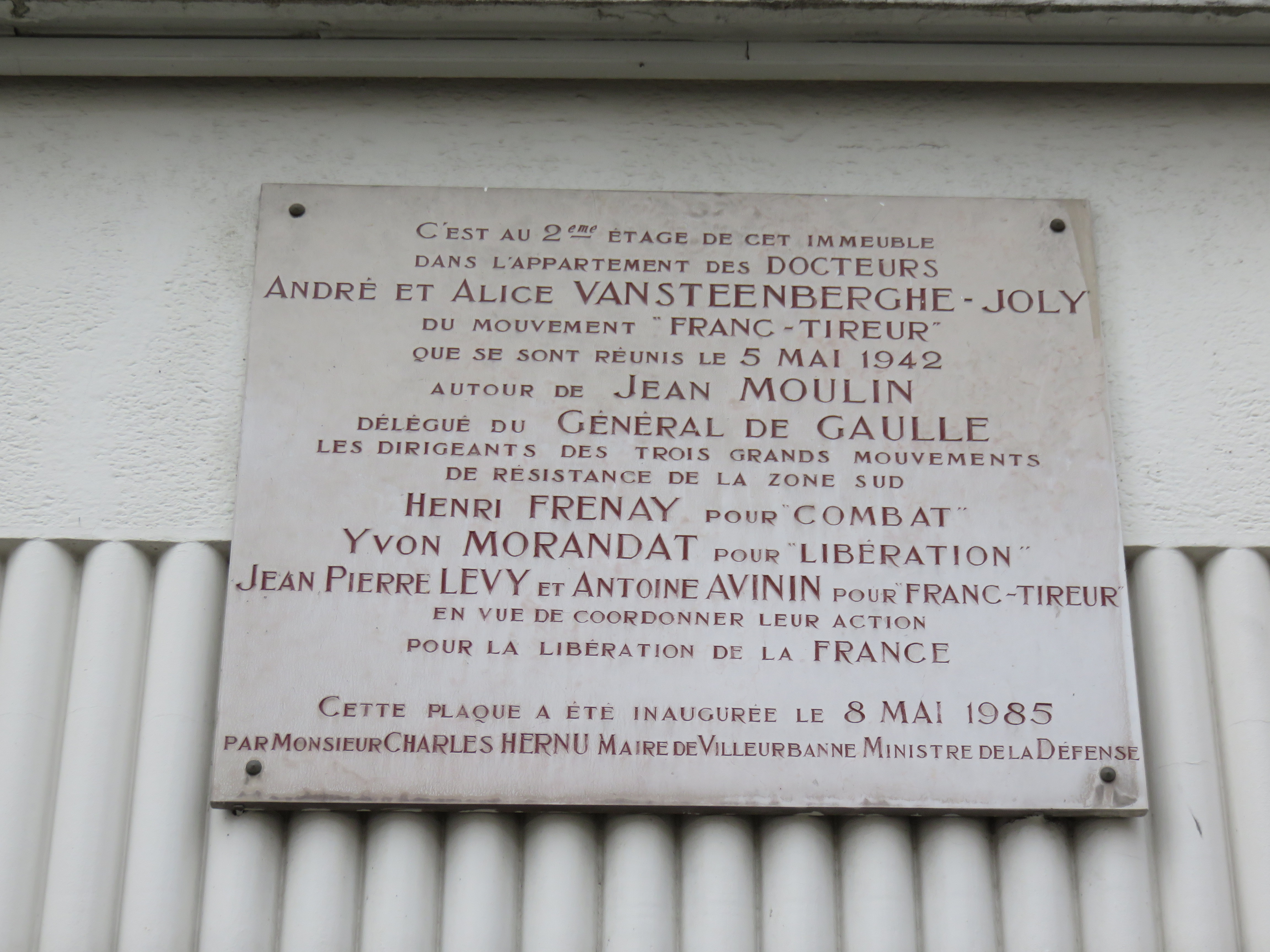
A plaque marking the building where Lévy signed an agreement with Jean Moulin uniting French resistant movements under Charles de Gaulle

In January 1942 Lévy met with Jean Moulin at Avignon. Moulin had been tasked by Free French leader Charles de Gaulle with coordinating French resistance movements. Lévy agreed with this goal and played an important role in negotiating co-ordination agreements with other organisations. Lévy secured weapons drops from the British intelligence services to support Franc-Tireur sabotage raids against German and Vichy forces in late 1942. He was arrested in Lyon but released when his co-accused accepted full responsibility. Lévy was arrested again on Christmas Eve but released by mistake and went into hiding after an arrest warrant was issued for him.

Franc-Tireur consolidated with Libération-sud and Combat in early 1943 to form the Mouvements unis de la Résistance (MUR); Lévy and Moulin joined the directorate of the new organisation. Lévy was designated a Companion of Liberation by Free France on 24 March 1943. Lévy escaped France by air on 15 April alongside Emmanuel d'Astier de La Vigerie, after two unsuccessful attempts. He met with resistance leaders in London and Algiers and became a key member of a group of Jewish socialists close to de Gaulle. After training in parachuting at Wilmslow, Cheshire, Levy and d'Astier returned to Lyon by Westland Lysander aircraft on 25 July 1943.

Lévy was arrested again in Paris on 16 October 1943. He was held at La Santé Prison for six months before a transfer was arranged to Fresnes Prison; the transfer convoy was attacked by a MUR force led by Charles Gonard and Lévy was freed. He afterwards joined the National Council of the Resistance as the representative of Franc-Tireur and was present at the August 1944 liberation of Paris. For his service during the war he received the British Military Cross, the Grand Cross of the Legion of Honour, the Croix de Guerre 1939–1945, the Resistance Medal and the Cross of the Resistance Volunteer Combatant.

== Post-war ==
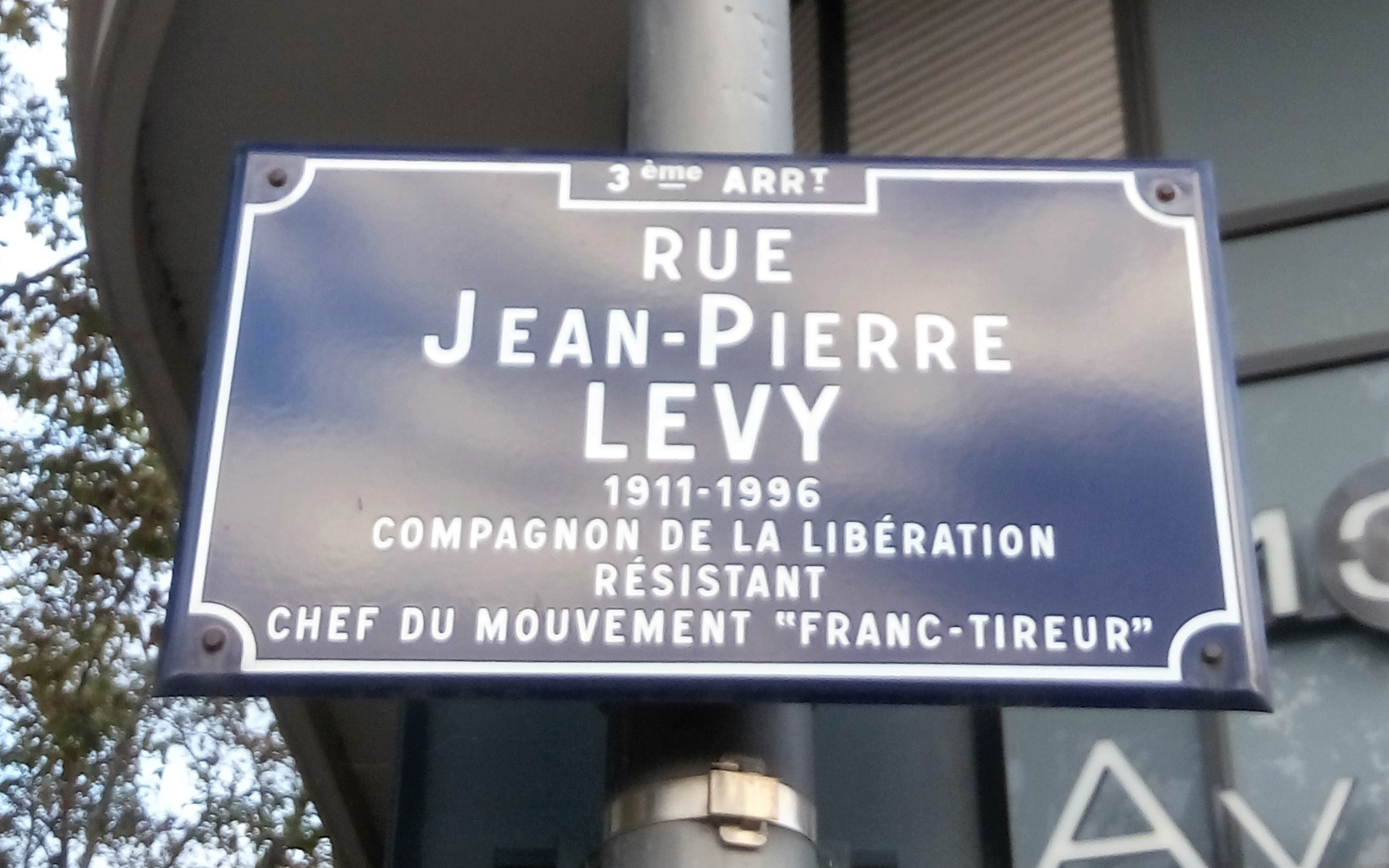
A street in Lyon named for Lévy

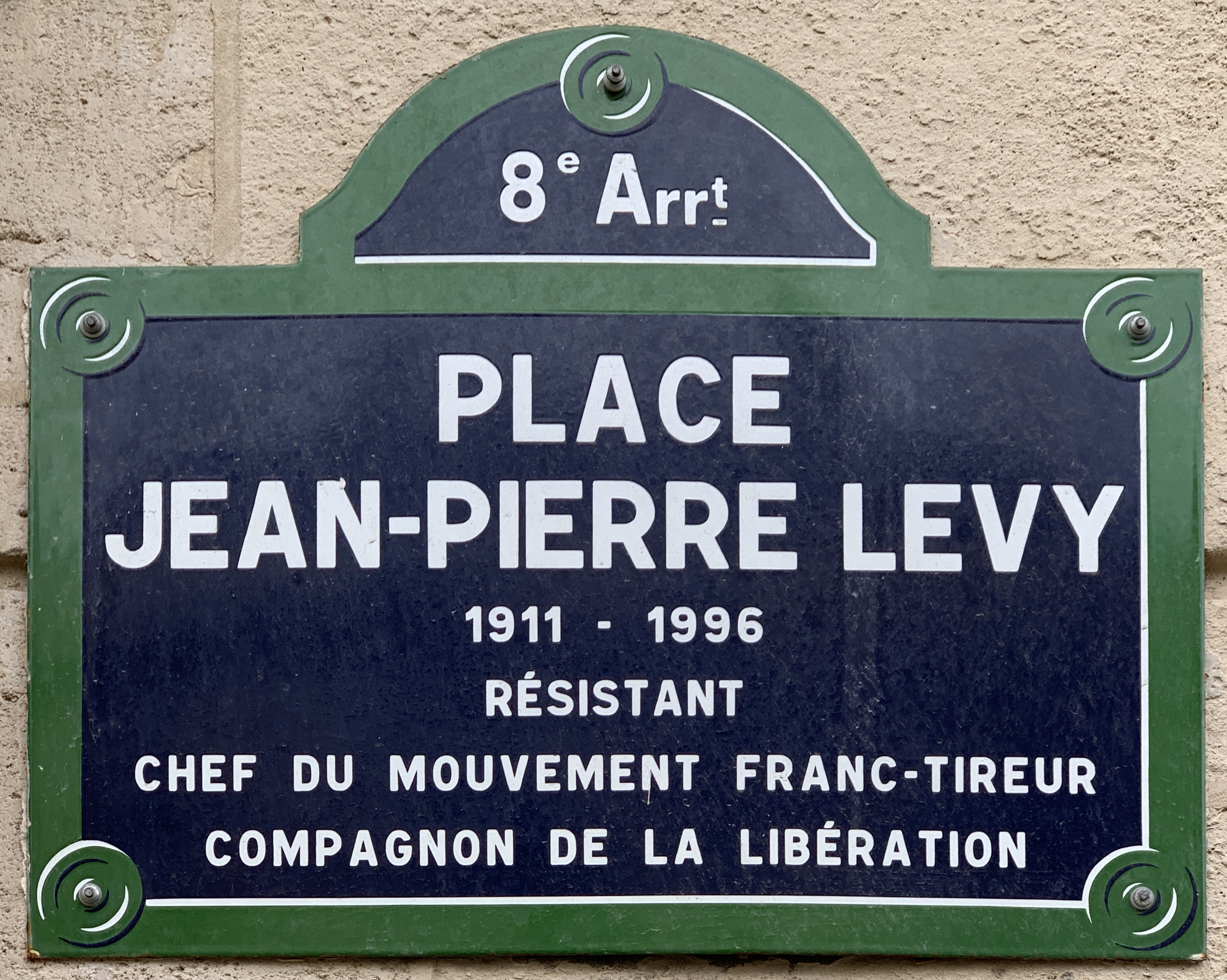
A street in Paris named for Lévy

After the liberation of France Lévy returned to industry. From 1944 to 1946 he was a commissioner at the Professional Office for Leather Industries and afterwards was director of a number of textile and leather businesses until 1970. Lévy served as a General Inspector of Industry in 1956 and from 1957 to 1964 was administrator of the Auvergne basin coal mines. From 1965 until 1971 he was administrator of the national authority for Renault factories and from 1968 to 1972 of the National Forests Office. From 1970 Lévy served as an extraordinary state councillor.

Lévy led the Institut Français de Recherche pour l'Exploitation de la Mer oceanographic institution from 1971 to 1976 and served as president of the HEC Paris business school from 1972 to 1978. He was appointed president of an advisory committee to study the medical and social aspects of the education of children in 1976 and served in that role until 1980.

Lévy supported former resistance fighters, being a member of the council of the Order of Liberation and founding vice-president of Revivre, an organisation that worked to assist the orphans of fighters. He was administrator of the Committee of Social Works of the Resistance from 1947 and president from 1972. Lévy was appointed vice-president of the Resistance Action Committee in 1954 and from 1967 was administrator of SOS Children's Villages in France. He joined the central committee of the International League Against Racism and Anti-Semitism in 1971; from 1979 was the administrator of the Center of Contemporary Jewish Documentation and from 1976 to 1980 he was a member of the steering committee of the League for Human and Citizen's Rights. Lévy was appointed a grand officer of the Ordre national du Mérite, officer of the Order of Agricultural Merit, commander of the Ordre du Mérite commercial et industriel and commander of the Ordre du Mérite artisanal.

Lévy died in Paris on 15 December 1996. His memoirs (Memoires D'Un Franc-Tireur. Itineraire D'Un Resistant (1940-1944) "Memoirs of a Franc-tireur: Journey of a resistance fighter (1940-1944)" ISBN 9782870277331) were published posthumously in Paris in 1998.
