= Jean Worms-Germinal =

French politician

Jean Worms-Germinal (10 October 1894 – 3 April 1974) was a French politician.

Jean Worms-Germinal was born in the 14th arrondissement of Paris on 10 October 1894. He earned a degree in engineering in 1913, and served in World War I with the 7th regiment of cuirassiers. Worms-Germinal joined the French Section of the Workers' International in 1912, and remained affiliated with SFIO through the Tours Congress. SFIO formed the Popular Front, which nominated Worms-Germinal as its candidate for the 1936 French legislative election for the Chamber of Deputies seat in Sarlat. After two rounds of voting, Worms-Germinal lost to Yvon Delbos. In 1938, he contested the Dordogne seat on the Senate, again with SFIO support, receiving only 135 votes. Worms-Germinal returned to military service during World War II, and later participated in the French Resistance as a member of Libération-sud, based in Dordogne. He was elected a representative to the Provisional Consultative Assembly which formed the French Committee of National Liberation. After the war ended, Worms-Germinal served on the National Constituent Assembly of the French Fourth Republic. He did not contest the legislative elections of November 1946, 1951, or 1956. Worms-Germinal sought election to the National Assembly in 1958 as an alternate member from Indre-et-Loire, but was not elected.

Worms-Germinal was awarded the Croix de Guerre 1939–1945 and the Resistance Medal for his actions during World War II, as well as knighthood of the Legion of Honor. He died on 3 April 1974 in Neuvic, Dordogne.
