= Marguerite Gonnet =

French resistance fighter during World War II (1898-1996)

Marguerite Gonnet (13 October 1898 - 27 May 1996) was a member of the French Resistance during World War II. She was from the city of Grenoble in southeastern France. At age forty-four, married with nine children, she joined the resistance group Libération-sud. She became the head of the resistance cell in the department of Isère. She was one of the only female heads of a resistance cell, along with Marie Reynoad.

In April 1942, she was arrested by the Nazis for carrying illegal newspapers. A German military prosecutor asked Gonnet why she had taken up arms against France's occupiers, to which she said, "Quite simply, Colonel, because the men had dropped them". This quote was used by American author Sarah Rose as the epigraph of her 2019 book D-Day Girls. Gonnet was sentenced to two years in prison, and her leadership role in the resistance was taken up by Jean Weber.

She died in Paris on 27 May 1996 at the age of 97. There is a street in Grenoble named after her. In 2020, author Olivier Vallade published a book about Gonnet Marguerite Gonnet: Déterminée à Sortir de l’ombre (English: Marguerite Gonnet: Determined to Emerge from the Shadows).
