= Antoine Avinin =

French politician (1902–1962)

Antoine Louis Avinin (26 January 1902 – 29 October 1962) [aliases Albert Arnaud, Albert Anceau, Albert Audin, Talbert] was a French businessman, resistance fighter and politician.

== Biography ==
He was born in Lyon. His parents owned a food trading business in Cantal. He went to boarding school with the Marist fathers of Notre-Dame de Bellegarde college in Neuville-sur-Saône. He completed first part of his baccalaureat before entering employment as a bank clerk and a chemist's assistant. He began national military service with the 7e bataillon de chasseurs alpins in Bourg-Saint-Maurice. He trained as an officer at the Saint-Maixent officer cadet course, leaving as a second lieutenant in 1922, after which his mother bought him a small factory in Villeurbanne, Lyon, where he began a clothing factory with a business partner.

He became an activist in the Ligue de la jeune République, a Christian democratic movement concerned with social action which succeeded Marc Sangnier's Le Sillon. He remained a reserve officer and as such was mobilized at the outbreak of World War II, commanding a company as a lieutenant in the 6e bataillon de chasseurs alpins at Heyrieux, Isère.

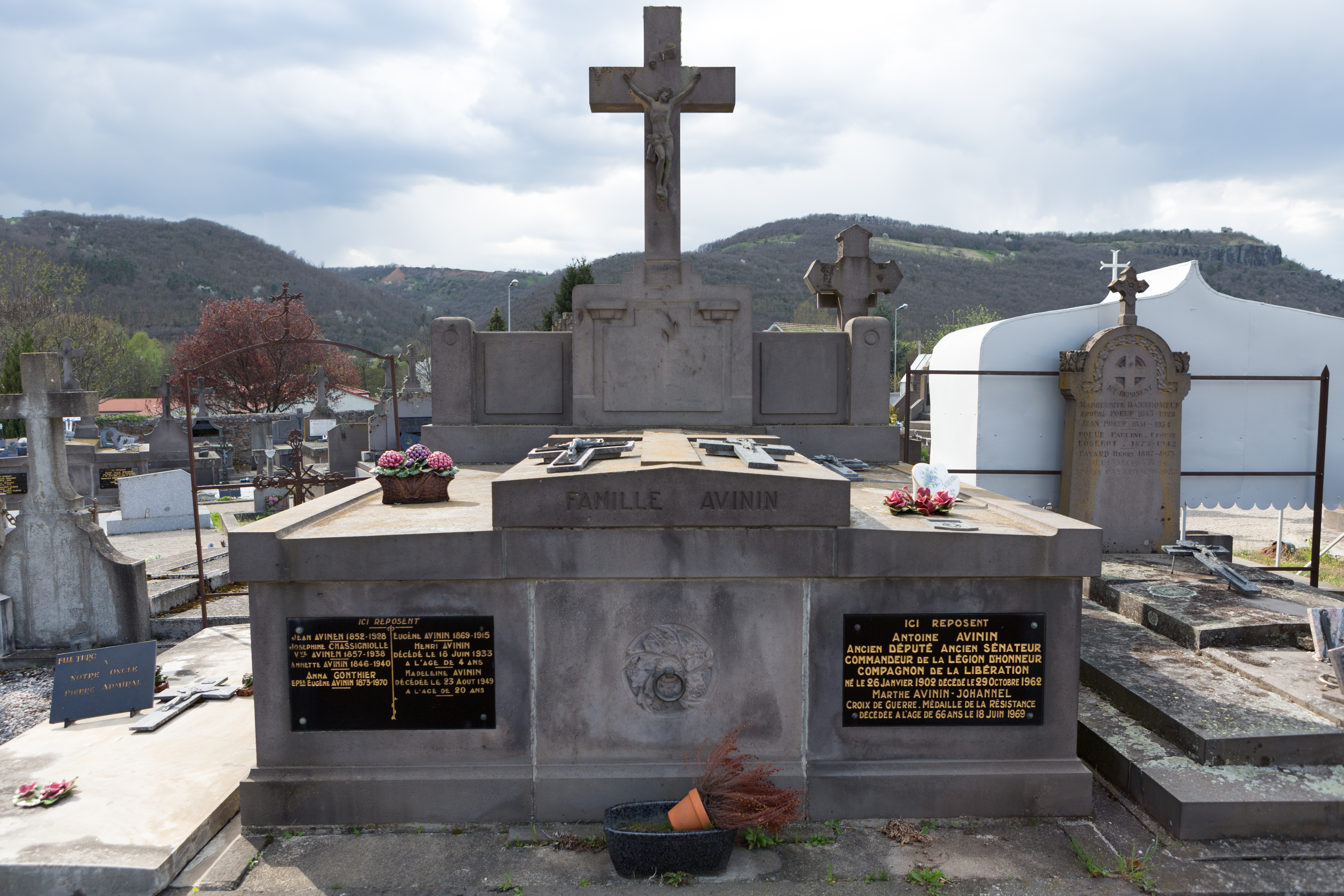
Avinin's tomb in Massiac

He founded the resistance network France-Liberté in November 1940 with Elie Péju, Auguste Pinton and Jean-Jacques Soudeille. In 1941, they created the Franc-Tireur movement from France-Liberté with Jean-Pierre Lévy from Strasbourg who had joined the latter some months earlier. Avinin met Yvon Morandat, an envoy of Charles de Gaulle, in November 1941. Morandat arranged for funds for the regular publication of the journal also named Franc-Tireur for which Avinin wrote editorials. Avinin was arrested in Lyon on 5 May 1942 as an editor and distributor of leaflets and imprisoned at Montluc prison. He was released in August for lack of evidence. Exposed in Lyon, he hid for a time in Cantal where he had many acquaintances. In autumn 1942, he moved to Toulouse where he developed the resistance movement. A persuasive orator, he became regional leader of Franc-Tireur then, until October 1943, regional leader of the Mouvements unis de la Résistance - the fusion of Combat, Libération-sud and Franc-Tireur for Région R4 (south-west). He reorganized this region and directed escapes via the Pyrenees. He travelled regularly between the south-west and Paris, where most resistance groups were headquartered. He took over control of Franc-Tireur after the arrest of its leader, Lévy, on 16 October 1943 and replaced him in the Mouvement de libération nationale and the Conseil national de la Résistance. He was involved in the liberation of Paris and was amongst those receiving Captain Raymond Dronne.

For his wartime actions in charge of Région R4, he was awarded the Ordre de la Libération on August 7, 1945. That year, he also became involved in active politics, becoming a deputy for the Seine region as part of the Union démocratique et socialiste de la Résistance. The following year, he was elected a senator for the Rassemblement des gauches républicaines representing the French residing in Indochina and sat on the Conseil de la République from 1946 to 1952.

He died in Massiac in 1962 and was buried in the local cemetery.

== Honors and awards ==
- Commander of the Order of Legion of Honour
- Order of Liberation
- Croix de guerre 1939-1945
- Resistance Medal
