= Georges Altman =

French journalist and resistance fighter (1901–1960)

Georges Altman (21 May 1901 – 1960) was a French journalist and resistance fighter. During World War II he was involved in the Franc-Tireur organisation, serving as editor. Post-war, he was involved in setting up the left-wing party Rassemblement démocratique révolutionnaire (Revolutionary Democratic Rally).

== Literary works ==
- An editor of "l'Humanité"
- An editor of "le Monde"
- An editor of "Le Progres" (1940-)
- An editor of "La Lumière" (1940-)
- An editor of the "Franc tireur"
- Ça, c'est cinéma et le cinéma soviétique
