= Libération-sud =

French resistance group

Libération-Sud
- Front Page of Libération Newspaper, May 1944
- Formation: December 1940
- Founded: Clermont-Ferrand
- Dissolved: 1944
- Purpose: Armed resistance and organised propaganda
- Location: Free Zone, France
- Leader: Emmanuel d'Astier, Raymond Aubrac
- Key people: Jean Cavaillès, Pierre Kaan, Lucie Aubrac

Libération-sud (French pronunciation: [libeʁasjɔ̃ syd], "Liberation-South") was a resistance group active between 1940-1944 and created in the Free Zone of France during the Second World War in order to fight against the Nazi occupation through coordinated sabotage and propaganda operations.

== Origins ==
Libération-Sud was established in a brothel of Clermont-Ferrand by an assortment of French intellectuals and activists including Emmanuel d'Astier, Pierre Kaan, Jean Cavaillès, Lucie Aubrac and Raymond Aubrac. The first important Resistant group to emerge after the German occupation, it began publishing Libération in July 1941. With the support of Daniel Mayer and the clandestine French Section of the Workers' International (SFIO, socialist party), the Libération-sud group grew rapidly.

== Relationship with other Resistance Movements ==
In 1942 Emmanuel d'Astier entered talks with Jean Moulin about the possibility of uniting all the resistance groups working in France. After much discussion Moulin persuaded the eight major resistance groups to form the Conseil National de la Résistance (CNR, National Council of Resistance). This included D'Astier's Libération-Sud as well as Combat (Henri Frenay), Franc-Tireur (Jean-Pierre Lévy), National Front (Pierre Villon), Comité d'Action Socialiste (Pierre Brossolette) and the Armée secrète (Charles Delestraint).

== Positioning ==
Libération-Sud attempted to oversee and coordinate all resistance activities in the southern zones of France that were unoccupied by Nazi troops. The group positioned itself as a movement "of the left, with a strong worker presence, socialist, masonic and Christian".

== Libération Newspaper ==
The first published edition of Libération, dated July 1941, resulted in the distribution of over 10,000 copies. In autumn 1942, Jules Meurillon was named in charge of the propaganda and distribution service of the organization and successfully increased the annual circulation of Libération to over 200,000 copies by August 1944.

The paper published by Libération-Sud is the same paper that Jean-Paul Sartre and Serge July re-founded in 1973.

== Members ==
- Emmanuel d'Astier de La Vigerie
- Jean-Annett d'Astier de La Vigerie
- Lucie Aubrac
- Raymond Aubrac
- Anne-Marie Bauer
- Robert Bine
- Emile Borel
- Jacques Brunschwig-Bordier
- Georges Canguilhem
- Jean Cavailles
- Roger Cerclier
- Auguste Chambonnet
- Jacques Chapou
- Pascal Copeau
- Edouard Corniglion-Molinier
- Albert Curvale
- Yvonne Lucienne Curvale
- Maurice Cuvillon
- Michel Dumnesnil de Gramont
- Julien Forgues
- Albert Fossey-François
- Jules Fourrier
- Jean Gagnant
- Marguerite Gonnet
- Annie Herve
- Pierre Hervé
- Robert Jallet
- Pierre Kaan
- Robert Kahn
- Pierre Kahn-Farelle
- Albert Kohan
- Maurice Kriegel-Valrimont
- Victor Leduc (= Valdemar Nechtschein)
- Philippe Malrieu
- Louis Martin-Chauffier
- Gilbert May
- Robert Monestier
- Andre Philip
- Marcel Poimboeuf
- Serge Ravanel
- Jacques Renard
- Maurice Rousselier
- Abel Sarramiac
- Pierre Stibbe
- Francois Verdier
- Jean-Pierre Vernant
- Pierre Vienot
- Alban Vistel
- Marius Vivier-Merle
- Jean Worms-Germinal
- Georges Zerapha

== See also ==
- Libération-Nord
- Marguerite Gonnet—French resistance member who was part of Libération-sud
- Category:Members of Liberation-Sud
