= Mouvements unis de la Résistance =

World War II French Resistance organisation

Unified Resistance Movements
- Mouvements unis de la Résistance
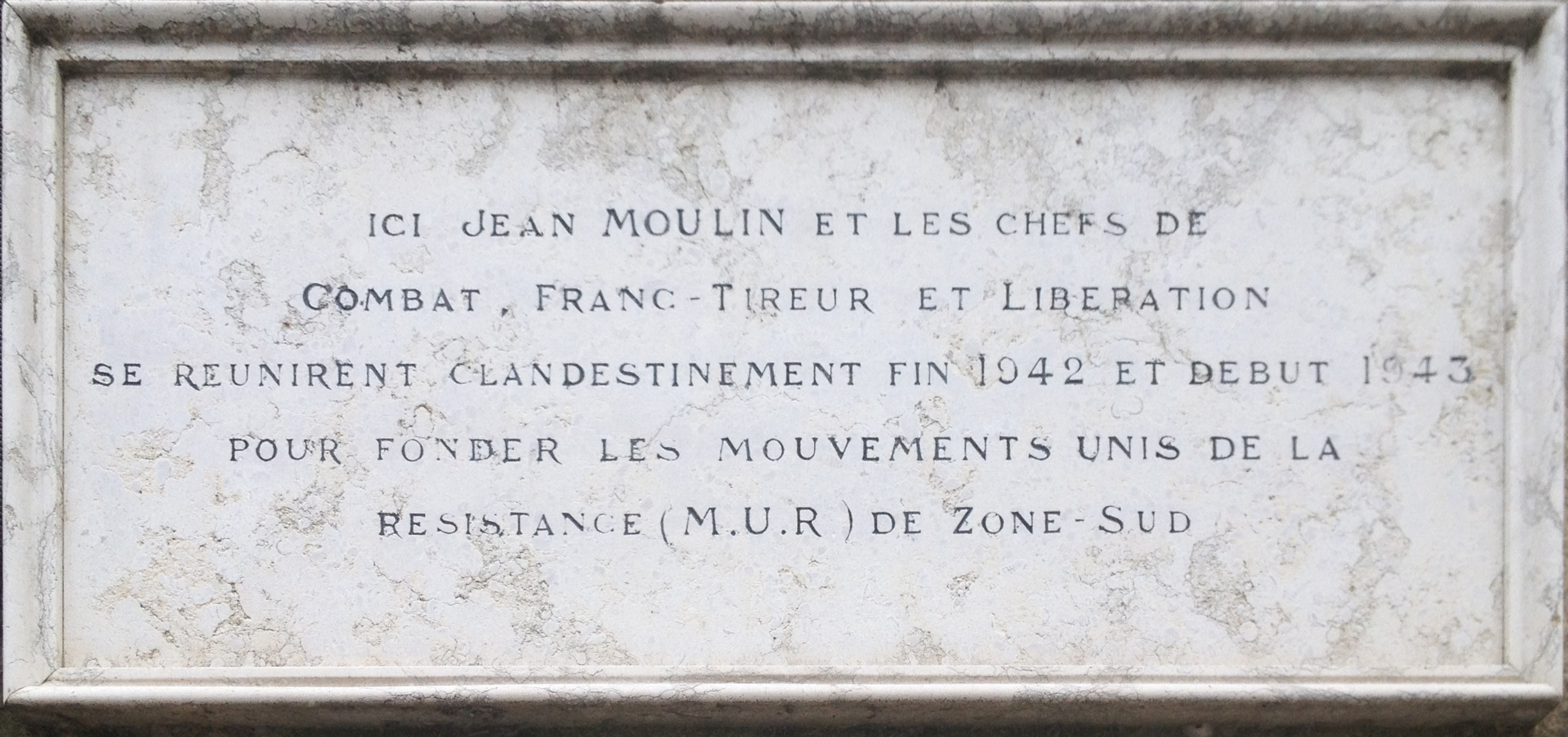
- Plaque commemorating creation of the MUR
- Leader: Jean Moulin
- Dates active: January 1943 -
- Ideology: Anti-fascist
- Wars: French Resistance, World War II

Mouvements unis de la Résistance (French pronunciation: [muvmɑ̃(z‿)yni də la ʁezistɑ̃s], lit. 'Unified Resistance Movements') was a French Resistance organisation, resulting from the consolidation of three major Resistance movements ("Combat", "Franc-Tireur" and "Libération-Sud") in January 1943 and also the merger of the military arms of these movements within the Armée secrète (Secret Army). Its committee was headed by Jean Moulin. These three then merged with five other major movements to form the Conseil National de la Résistance.
