= Franc-Tireur (movement) =

Franc-Tireur (French pronunciation: [fʁɑ̃ tiʁœʁ], lit. 'Free Shooter') was a French Resistance movement of centrist political orientation and the smallest of the three founding member-organisations of the Mouvements Unis de la Résistance in 1943.

== History ==
The movement was founded in Lyon in November 1940 under the name "France Liberté" with the goal of countering Vichy propaganda. Its first members were Antoine Avinin of the left-Catholic Young Republic League, the former city councillor Auguste Pinton, and the ex-Communists Élie Péju and Jean-Jacques Soudeille of the Radical Party. The movement gained traction when the leadership was assumed in spring 1941 by Jean-Pierre Lévy, a demobilised artillery lieutenant and a refugee Alsatian businessmen with extensive middle-class contacts in the south. It was renamed "Franc-Tireur" (after the irregulars of the Franco-Prussian War in 1870–71) in December 1941 on the proposal of Jean-Jacques Soudeille.

Franc-Tireur was also the name of the movement's principal clandestine newspaper, which continued publishing issues from December 1941 to 1957 by which point the editorial team had changed several times.

Under the guidance of Jean Moulin, the movement merged in early 1943 with the left-wing Libération-sud and the right-wing Combat to form the non-communist Resistance bloc Mouvements Unis de la Résistance (MUR).

== Political orientation ==
The Franc-Tireur declared itself in favour of democratic pluralism and against all forms of dictatorship and strong government. It supported the crushing of Nazism while denouncing "totalitarian and murderous Bolshevism" and "obligatory syndicalism". It has therefore been characterised as a "moderate, independent republican group: democratic, antiracist, antibolshevik, and pro-European". The revolutionary rhetoric adopted by the group (as seen e.g. in the title of its magazine Le Père Duchesne) contrasted with its moderate socialist programme. It stood politically between the right-wing Combat and the Communist Francs-Tireurs et Partisans (which adopted a similar name in early 1942).

== Notable members ==
- Édouard Alexander
- Georges Altman
- Antoine Avinin
- Marc Bloch
- Eugène Claudius-Petit
- Noël Clavier
- Yves Farge
- André Ferrat
- Jean-Pierre Lévy
- Élie Péju
- Auguste Pinton
- Albert Rohmer
- Henri Romans-Petit
- Jean-Jacques Soudeille

== See also ==
- Clandestine press of the French Resistance

== Bibliography ==
- Fink, Carole (1989). Marc Bloch: A Life in History. Cambridge: Cambridge University Press. ISBN 978-0-52140-671-0.
- Schöttler, Peter (2022), "Marc Bloch in the French Resistance" (PDF), History Workshop Journal, 93, translated by Jane Caplan: 3–22, doi:10.1093/hwj/dbac014, archived from the original on 2022-06-04
