= React =

REACT or React may refer to:

== Computing ==
- React (software), a JavaScript library for building user interfaces from Facebook Inc (now Meta Platforms)
  - React Native, a mobile application framework created by Facebook Inc (now Meta Platforms)
- ReactOS, an open-source operating system compatible with Microsoft Windows

== Arts and entertainment ==
- React (book), originally Reacciona, a 2011 Spanish-language book
- React (media franchise), a metaseries of web videos created by the Fine Brothers

=== Music ===
- React (band), a 1990s American boys band made of Tim Cruz and Daniel Matrium
- React Music Limited, a 1990s London based dance record label
- React (The Fixx album), 1987 live album
- React (Erick Sermon album), 2002
  - "React" (Erick Sermon song), a song from the album
- React (Robert Rich and Ian Boddy album), 2008
- "React" (Onyx song), 1998
- "React" (The Pussycat Dolls song), 2020
- "React" (Switch Disco and Ella Henderson song), 2023

== Organizations ==
- Radio Emergency Associated Communication Teams, a volunteer radio emergency service across the US and Canada
- Rapid Enforcement Allied Computer Team, a task force of the High Technology Theft Apprehension and Prosecution Program, California, US

== Other uses ==
- REACT (telescope), a telescope at Fenton Hill Observatory, New Mexico, US
- Rapid Execution and Combat Targeting System, the command and control system of the US for nuclear intercontinental ballistic missiles
- Remote Electronically Activated Control Technology belt (REACT belt), a restraint device

== See also ==
- Reaction (disambiguation)
