= Minileaks =

Spanish-based organization promoting civil liberties

- Formation: 2010
- Founder: Eduardo Laporte and Iñigo Antolín
- Dissolved: Spring 2013
- Type: Non-profit organization
- Purpose: To promote freedom of speech and civil justice
- Location: Spain

Minileaks is a non-profit organization whose aim is to promote freedom of speech and civil justice in Spain. Inspired by the ideals of the 2011 Spanish protests 15-M movement, the project was founded in 2010 by journalists Eduardo Laporte and Iñigo Antolín and garnered significant attention from the Spanish and Latin American media

The collective's chief modus operandi is to publicize cases of corporate or government wrongdoing against individuals, using documentary evidence obtained by the victim to verify the reports. Cases are submitted anonymously via email or post.

The project has been on an indeterminate hiatus since Spring 2013, although it maintains an active social media presence.

== See also ==
- WikiLeaks
