= 15m =

15m or 15M may refer to:

- 15-meter band, an amateur radio frequency band
- 15-M Movement, the 2011–2015 anti-austerity movement in Spain
