= Art Bowker =

American author profiler (born 1961)

- Born: 1961 (age 64–65) Ohio, United States
- Occupation: Author; cybercrime specialist

Art Bowker (born 1961 in Ohio) is an American author and cybercrime specialist in corrections (Including pretrial, probation, and parole). His first book, The Cybercrime Handbook for Community Corrections: Managing Risk in the 21st Century, describes the process of supervising cyber-offenders. Bowker, along with Todd G. Shipley, wrote a book called Investigating Internet Crimes, 1st Edition: An Introduction to Solving Crimes in Cyberspace, which provides step-by-step instructions for investigating Internet crimes.

== Career ==
Bowker has been interviewed by CrimCast and American Hero's Radio, and is a lifetime member of the High Technology Crime Investigation Association (HTCIA), having served as International President of the organization in 2008. He has written cybercrime articles that have appeared in the FBI Law Enforcement Bulletin, Federal Probation, the American Probation and Parole Association's Perspectives, and other publications. He also writes a blog called The Three C's: Computers, Crime, and Corrections.

On January 14, 2013, Bowker was awarded the APPA Sam Houston State University Award.

On November 22, 2013, he was awarded the Richard F. Doyle Award by the Federal Probation and Pretrial Officers Association (FPPOA) for his contribution to the Federal Probation & Pretrial Services System. Bowker also received the Thomas E. Gahl, Line Officer of the Year Award (Great Lakes Region Award), which is named in honor of the only U.S. Probation Officer killed in the line of duty.

On August 30, 2016, he was recognized by the High Technology Crime Investigation Association with the HTCIA Lifetime Achievement Award for his participation as its chapter or international officer.
