= Bulgarian crisis =

Bulgarian Crisis may refer to:

- Bulgarian Crisis (1885–88)
- Bulgarian Declaration of Independence (1908)
- Negotiations of Bulgaria with the Central Powers and the Entente (1915)
- Incident at Petrich (1925)
- Bulgarian financial crisis of 1996–97
- 2013 Bulgarian protests
- Bulgarian political crisis (2021–2026)
