= KnujOn =

Anti-spam project, 2005 to 2018

KnujOn ("no junk" spelled backwards, and pronounced "new john") was a project involved in Internet security. KnujOn targeted spam at its root, attacking the illicit activities that spammers derived their revenue from. To that end, KnujOn ran an automated spam reporting tool.

== History ==
KnujOn was founded in 2005 by Garth Bruen and his father, Dr. Robert Bruen. A multi-purpose software tool called KnujOn was presented at the Northeast Chapter of the High Technology Crime Investigation Association (HTCIA) in November 2005. That software, designed to filter junk mail and produce complaints that may result in the shutdown of scam websites, tracked Internet-based scams and built profiles of persons or organizations engaged in suspicious Internet activity by gathering and sorting large amounts of data.

KnujOn.com collected spam samples from the public, not to build better filters or blacklists, but rather to use them for illicit site termination, test the Internet's policy infrastructure, and gather important statistics. Their general goal was to target advertised illicit transaction sites and hopefully take the financial incentive out of the spam cycle.

The service stopped accepting new subscriptions and email submissions on 8 March 2018, and starting from that date, email submissions began bouncing. Eventually, on 22 May 2018, the service was completely shut down.

== See also ==
- Blue Frog
