= Asociación Democracia Real Ya =

Spanish nonpartisan association

ASOCIACIÓN “DEMOCRACIA REAL YA”
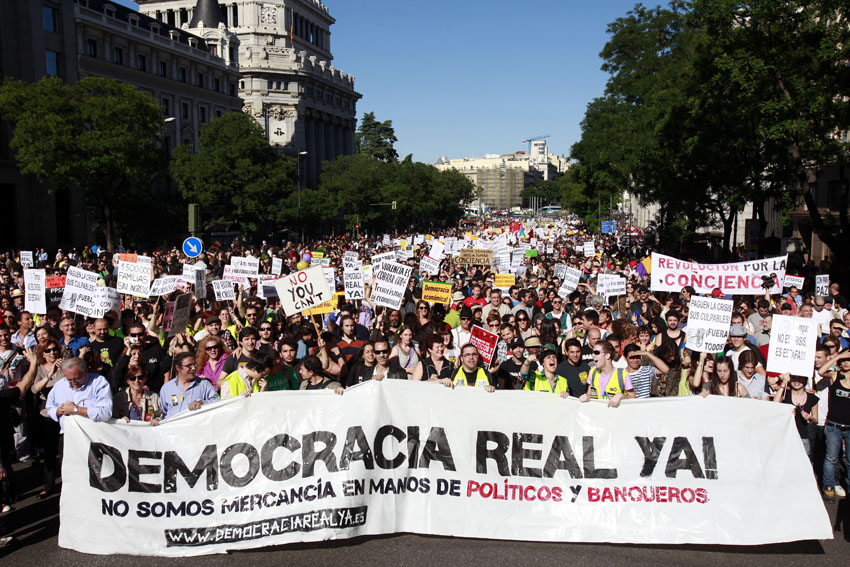
- Democracia real YA Madrid
- Founded: April 3, 2012
- Type: nonpartisan, non-union, non-violent and non-profit
- Location: Spain
- Website: www.asociaciondry.org
- Formerly called: Plataforma Democracia Real Ya

The Asociación Democracia Real Ya (Real Democracy NOW! association, Democracia Real Ya association, DRY or DRY association) is an association created as from a split in Plataforma ¡Democracia Real YA! by several speakers and members who left the Platform Real Democracy Now!, most of them being initiators of that platform. The association is defined as nonpartisan, non-syndicalist, non-violent and non-profit.

== History ==
In April 2012, several members of the Platform Real Democracy Now! requested the holding of an Extraordinary General Meeting in order to turn the platform into an association. Following this meeting emerged a new working mechanism: an association, taking the same name, Asociación Democracia Real Ya, with rules, regulations and targets, based on the foundation of the platform, which was created by some of the promoters initial movement. The creation of this association also resulted in the rejection of the remaining members of the movement, which continue on the platform.

== Reasons for the creation of the association ==
The creators advocate the creation of a non-profit association with a legal form, to search for "exert coordinated pressure" on institutions 'and' restore the original spirit of the 15-M". So, get a CIF (tax identification number) to enable them to carry out proposals as to promote a possible popular initiative, be more legally protected as a collective and as individuals and also streamline their performance through better internal organization.

The aim of the association is to create a "citizen lobby", translate the voice of the people in proposals as popular initiative, among others, that have no place in the political space.

Its members are outraged citizens of all political stripes (or without them) joined by his claim that some governments have turned to real democracy for the interests of a minority. "In a statement say that we are neither of left nor right, we are the underdogs and we go for the top" (No somos ni de izquierdas ni de derechas, somos los de abajo y vamos a por los de arriba).

== See also ==
- 2011–2012 Spanish protests
- We are the 99%
- Occupy Wall Street
- 15 October 2011 global protests
- Occupy movement
- Political corruption
- Politics of Switzerland
