= High Technology Theft Apprehension and Prosecution Program =

Program concerned with high technology crime

The High Technology Theft Apprehension and Prosecution Program (HTTAP Program) is a program within the California Emergency Management Agency (CalEMA) concerned with high technology crime including white-collar crime, cracking, computerized money laundering, theft of services, copyright infringement of software, remarking and counterfeiting of computer hardware and software, and industrial espionage.

== High Technology Crime Advisory Committee ==
The High Technology Crime Advisory Committee was "established for the purpose of formulating a comprehensive written strategy for addressing high technology crime throughout the state" and is composed of the following individuals appointed by the CalEMA Secretary:

1. a designee of the California District Attorneys Association
2. a designee of the California State Sheriffs Association
3. a designee of the California Police Chiefs Association
4. a designee of the California Attorney General
5. a designee of the California Highway Patrol
6. a designee of the High Technology Crime Investigation Association
7. a designee of the California Emergency Management Agency
8. a designee of the American Electronics Association to represent California computer system manufacturers
9. a designee of the American Electronics Association to represent California computer software producers
10. a designee of CTIA - The Wireless Association
11. a representative of the California Internet industry
12. a designee of the Semiconductor Equipment and Materials International
13. a designee of the California Cable & Telecommunications Association
14. a designee of the Motion Picture Association of America
15. a designee of the California Communications Associations (CalCom)
16. a representative of the California banking industry
17. a representative of the California Office of Information Security and Privacy Protection
18. a representative of the California Department of Finance
19. a representative of the California State Chief Information Officer
20. a representative of the Recording Industry Association of America
21. a representative of the Consumers Union

== Task Forces ==
The program is implemented by funding and supporting independent regional task forces:

- the Computer and Technology Crime High-Tech Response Team (CATCH) of the San Diego County District Attorney's Office
- the Northern California Computer Crimes Task Force (NC3TF) of the Marin County District Attorney's Office
- the Rapid Enforcement Allied Computer Team (REACT) of the Santa Clara County District Attorney's Office
- the Southern California High Tech Task Force (SCHTTF) of the Los Angeles County Sheriff's Department
- the Sacramento Valley Hi-Tech Crimes Task Force (SVHTCTF) of the Sacramento County Sheriff's Department
