= ¡Democracia Real YA! =

Spanish grassroots organization

Real Democracy NOW!
- ¡Democracia Real YA!
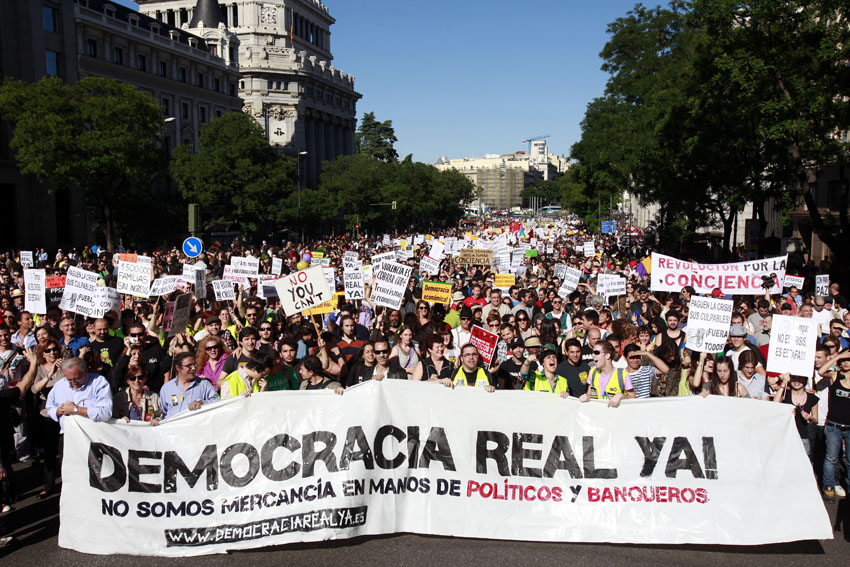
- Protestors marching in Madrid on May 15, 2011
- Abbreviation: DRY
- Formation: March 2011
- Type: Grassroots organization
- Legal status: Active
- Purpose: Manifesto
- Location: Spain
- Official language: Spanish
- Website: democraciarealya.es

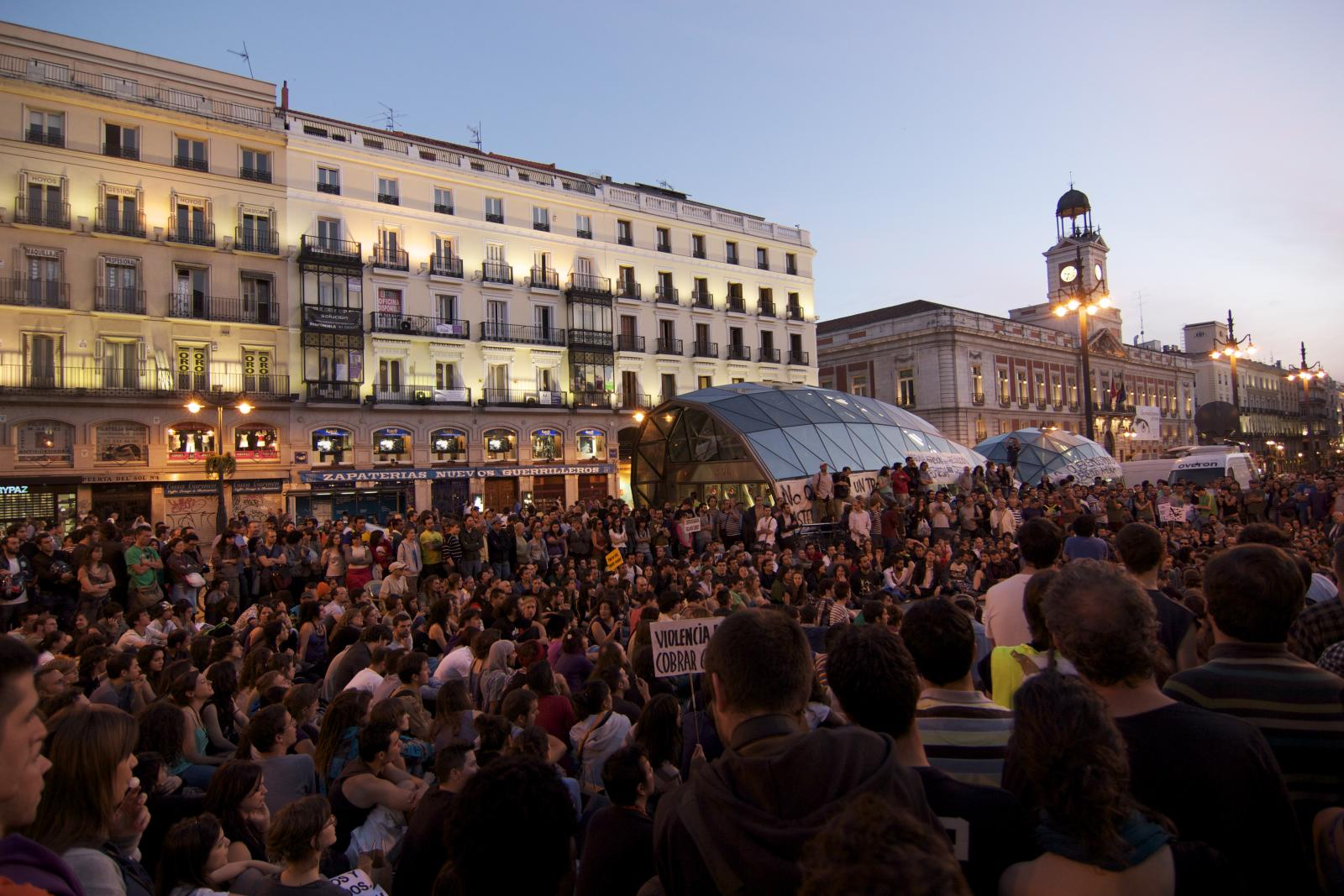
The demonstration in Madrid on May 15, 2011

¡Democracia Real YA! (DRY, Spanish for Real Democracy NOW!), also known as Plataforma Democracia Real Ya! (Real Democracy NOW Platform!), is a Spanish grassroots organization that started in March 2011 in Madrid, Spain. It sparked the political movement of May 15, 2011 (15M) whose protests gained worldwide attention. The protests have been compared to the May 1968 social movement in France.

¡Democracia Real YA! is associated with approximately 200 smaller organizations. ¡Democracia Real YA! states in its manifesto that it is a broad social movement, dedicated to nonviolent protest, and that maintains no affiliation with any political party or labor union. It has not appointed any single leader and is unwilling to join any of the existing political bodies. It is, however, not an entirely apolitical movement. ¡Democracia Real YA! considers the current political and economic system incapable of listening to and representing its citizens and therefore demands changes to the current social and economic policies, which have led many people into unemployment, loss of their homes, and poverty. The organization denounces the way big businesses and banks dominate the political and economic sphere and aims to propose a series of solutions to these problems through grassroots participatory democracy and direct democracy, which is based on people's assemblies and consensus decision making. The movement drew inspiration from the 2009 Icelandic financial crisis protests, the Arab Spring, the 2010–11 Greek protests and the 2010–11 revolutions in Tunisia.

The protest movement gained momentum on May 15 with a camping occupation in Madrid's main square, the Puerta del Sol, spreading to squares in 57 other major and smaller cities in Spain, and then to Spanish embassies all around the world.

In April 2012 some of the initiators of the movement, following an Extraordinary General Meeting of the Platform held in Leganes, the movement split announcing the creation of an organizational structure and rules as a partnership, taking the same name, Asociación Democracia Real Ya, which caused the rejection of part of the rest of the members of the movement. Thus, there are currently active platform Real Democracy Now! on the one hand, and the association DRY on the other hand.

== Protests organized by ¡Democracia Real YA! ==
Shortly after Stéphane Hessel's 2010 tract Time for Outrage! (Indignez-vous!) and Rosa María Artal's 2011 book, React (Reacciona) were published, DRY organized demonstrations in 50 Spanish cities for May 15, 2011. The demonstrations requested a new democratic model denouncing the corruption of politicians and the powerful influence of banks in the political sphere. The movement refused to support any specific political party or labor union, and thousands of citizens mobilized under the slogan "Real democracy NOW, We are not merchandise for bankers and politicians." After the very first demonstration in Madrid, a few of these protesters attempted an overnight occupation of the Puerta del Sol; they were consequently arrested the following morning on May 17. On the first night of protests, 19 students were arrested and charged for public disorder and damaging public property. Eighteen of the arrested individuals were kept for two days, and one was released for health reasons. According to witnesses of the event, there was reported "abuse of authority" by the police when handling the protesters. Those protesters who stayed in the Puerta del Sol demanded the students be released and that all charges be dropped. On May 17, the 18 remaining students were released, but protesters stood outside the gates of the courts demanding their acquittal. After the eviction, DRY stated,

As the organizers of the protest distance ourselves from, and reject, all violent incidents that occurred after the protest in Madrid. According to our sources, the incidents of violence, although completely reprehensible, were minimal, occurring for the most part after the protests of peaceful civil disobedience. The State Security Forces acted in a disproportionate and excessive manner, which we equally condemn, and we wish to show our solidarity with those who were unjustly injured and detained for the mere fact of having been there without provoking anyone.

In response, ten thousand people returned to the plaza with the intent to remain until the elections on Sunday, May 22. Camps began to spread beyond the Puerta del Sol to main squares in many other cities throughout Spain, and eventually Europe. On May 18, the Board of Elections of Madrid prohibited the protest in the Puerta del Sol, and protests were also banned in Granada. This resulted in an influx of protesters, or as they called themselves "indignados" - the outraged. The gathering was organized via Twitter. Police surrounded the protestors on the 18th, but made no attempts to interfere. In the days before Spanish regional elections ¡Democracia Real YA! clarified that the camps had been organized by individuals, not by DRY. They stated that they were not seeking abstention, but rather long term change to political and financial institutions in order for them to better serve the majority of the population.

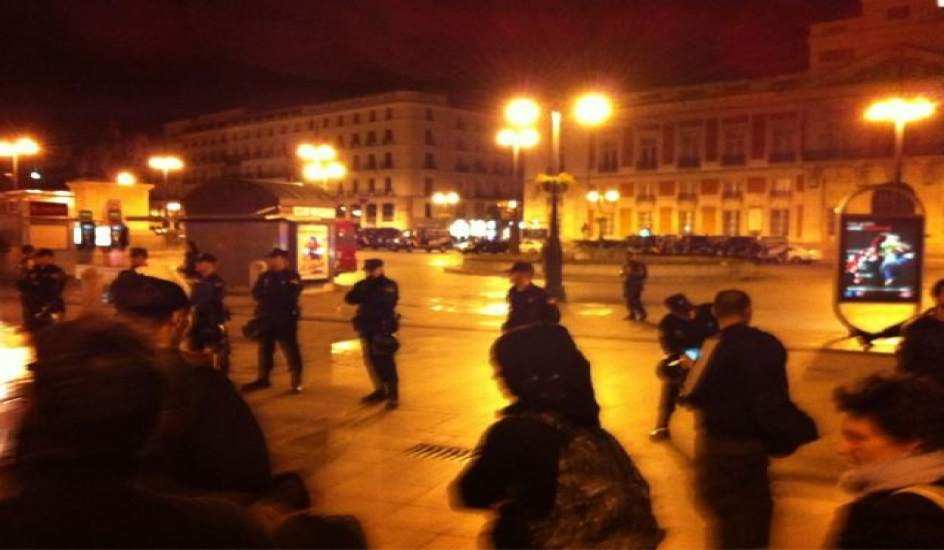
A police line on the edge of the protest in Madrid on May 15, 2011

The Central Board of Elections met to decide definitively about the fate of the protests prior to the election. Twenty-four hours immediately preceding and election day is called The Day of Reflection, during which all political campaigning is prohibited. The Board ruled that the encampments must be broken up during that period. It was decided that the protests were politically charged in such a way that they might affect the outcome of the elections. President Zapatero agreed with the Board's ruling. On May 21, many of the encampments across Spain were raided. No violence accompanied this dispersal; the police were ordered not to use force. Despite the Election Board's ruling, there were protesters that remained. Some of those remaining protesters symbolically taped their mouths shut as they were ordered to be silent.

== Democracia Real YA's manifesto ==
Despite allegations of being a left-wing movement, Democracia Real YA's manifesto, and the movement's rhetoric in general, claim to transcend the traditional one-dimensional left-right paradigm and call for a democratic regeneration:

Some of us consider ourselves progressive, others conservative. Some of us are believers, some not. Some of us have clearly defined ideologies, others are apolitical, but we are all concerned and angry about the political, economic, and social outlook which we see around us; corruption among politicians, businessmen, bankers, leaves us helpless, without a voice. This situation has become normal, a daily suffering, without hope. But if we join forces, we can change it. It's time to change things, time to build a better society together. "Democracia Real YA Manifesto". 7 June 2024.

The manifesto emphasizes the responsibility of the government to provide all of its citizens with "the right to housing, employment, culture, health, education, political participation, free personal development, and consumer rights for a healthy and happy life." Democracia Real Ya calls for an ethical revolution, and a recognition of the priority of "equality, progress, solidarity, freedom of culture, sustainability and development, welfare and people's happiness." The manifesto has been criticised for not recognising how Spain's largely uncritical embrace of some aspects of cultural modernity - consumerism and hedonism in particular - has in many respects created the economic crisis.

=== Demands of ¡Democracia Real YA! ===
¡Democracia Real YA! and the protesters have stated that their demands are that the Spanish government:

- Eliminate privileges for the political class
- Combat unemployment
- Promote rights to housing
- Improve public services in teaching, health, and public transport
- Increase regulation of the banking industry
- Implement new fiscal measures
- Invigorate citizen's rights and participatory democracy
- Reduce military spending.

They believe that these demands will bring about the change in society needed to assist those who are not among the country's privileged elite and to ensure that Spain functions as a true democracy in which the people's voices are heard and considered.

=== May Elections and future directions for DRY ===
On May 22, the Popular Party won in a majority of Spanish local and regional elections. The Popular Party, the conservative party in Spain, was able to win the election because the liberal vote was fractured among multiple political parties (the greatest harm being done to the Spanish Socialist Worker's Party). The results of this election have led some to criticize of the electoral system. Some have also noted that the economic crisis currently facing Spain almost guaranteed a majority victory for the Popular Party in the November Elections.

For the November 20, 2011 elections, the Madrid Electoral Board banned any protest in any square or street fifteen days before the election. Despite this ban, plans were made for protests on the 11th and 13th, as the ban was expected to increase protest participation.

The main criticism of ¡Democracia real YA! is that the economy has taken over the political system. In order to promote democratic process,¡Democracia real YA! has proposed Democracia 4.0

They intend to increase citizen participation in politics through technology, like voting Congress initiatives over the Internet. If the movement strives to stay away from the traditional parties, which are backed by the majority of citizens (61 percent voted for a party in the last election), it is doubtful that the Spanish Revolution can make their proposals work. Another recurring criticism is its difficulty to define specific measures. Most experts say that the Spanish Revolution will be dissolved, but before this happens, they will be able to prepare the field for fundamental changes aimed at improving citizen representation and limiting the excesses of the political and economic systems."

== Influences and related social movements ==
While the concentration of economic and political power are at the heart of the protests in Spain, other sources of inspiration include the financial crisis of Iceland, the film Inside Job, and the text Time for Outrage! (English translation), a booklet written by a concentration camp survivor and member of the French Resistance, Stéphane Hessel. The protests in Spain are part of a global unrest brought about by austerity measures implemented by various governments, such as pension reform for public employees in Wisconsin.

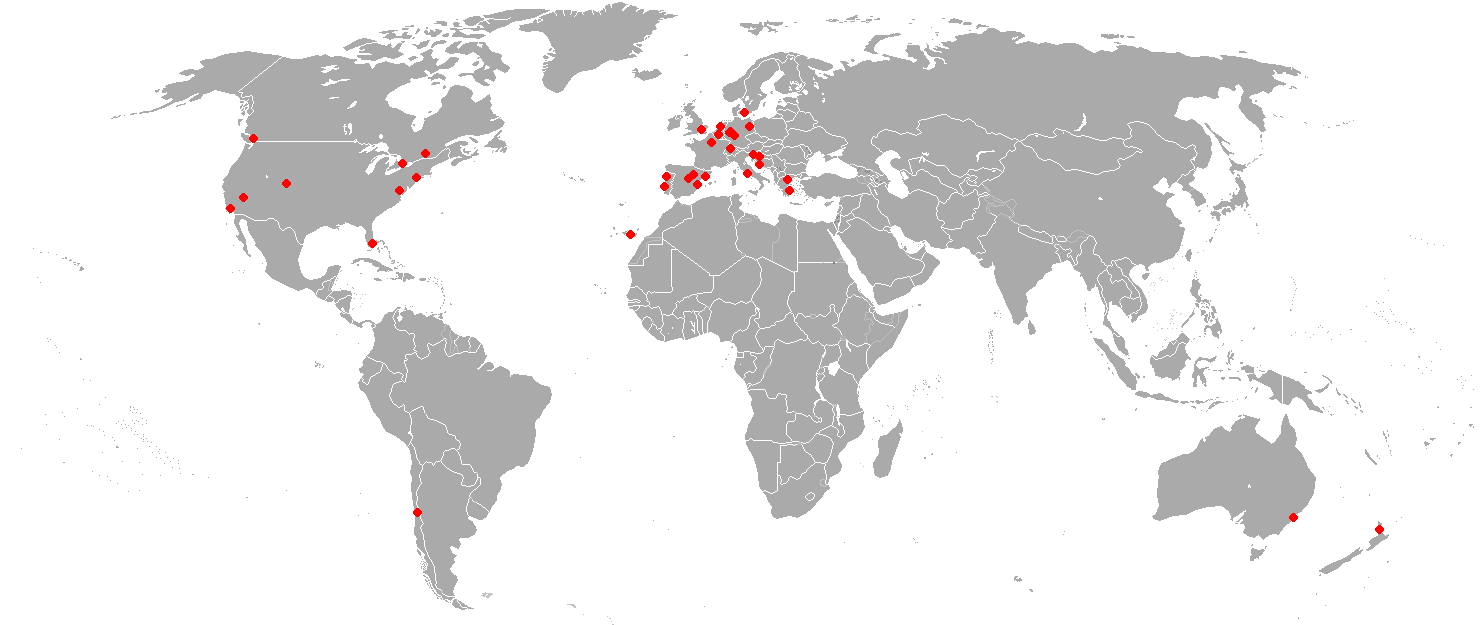
Locations of similar protests around the world

Other protests with similarities to the Spanish protests include:

- 2011 Egyptian revolution
- Tunisian Revolution
- 2008 Greek riots
- 2010-2011 anti-austerity Greek protests
- 2011 Israeli social justice protests

The Protests in Spain also inspired the Occupy Wall Street movement Democracia Real Ya calls for the immediate return of control over the polis and government back to the people. As demonstrated by protesters camping out in Zuccotti Park in Manhattan, Tahrir Square in Cairo, Puerta del Sol in Madrid, and Plaça Catalunya in Barcelona, there is a general discontent for the usurpation of public control by private interests. Those encamped hope to raise awareness and support for their cause of putting people ahead of corporate interests and making sure that democratic governments around the world are capable of serving as voices of the voting public.

== Chronology of events ==
- September 29, 2010 - Spain's unions led a General Strike throughout the country to protest new labor reforms. The government had passed the reforms to improve the economy, but in reality they made worsened conditions for the workers. The General Strike was one of the first events in Spain where the common people voiced their concerns against the capitalist government.
- January 27, 2011 - Unions in Catalonia, Galicia, and the Basque Country held a smaller strike. They were protesting more labor reforms of the Socialist government, in particular the raising of the retirement age to 67.
- April 7, 2011 - 5,000 people gathered in Madrid to support the group Youth without a Future (Juventud sin Futuro) and their goals to change the capitalist economic structure.
- May 1, 2011 - May Day traditionally has been a day to celebrate workers around the world. In Barcelona, the unions led this protest that turned into a violent rebellion. Workers destroyed many businesses in the richest neighborhood until the police stopped them.
- May 13, 2011 - DRY occupied the central office of Santander Bank in Murcia to symbolize their rebellion against the richest percentages of society and the power of the bankers.
- May 15, 2011 – The first protest. ¡Democracia real YA! counted 50,000 participants in Madrid alone. Protesters blocked Gran Via Avenue and held a peaceful sit-in on Callao St. Police used physical force to move the protesters, causing riots to erupt.
- May 16, 2011 – A group of protesters gathered in Puerta del Sol and vowed to stay there through the elections on May 22. #spanishrevolution became a trending topic on Twitter.
- May 17, 2011 – In the morning, police removed the 150 overnight protesters from Puerta del Sol. Overnight protests took place in 30 cities throughout Spain. In the evening, 4000 protesters re-occupied Puerta del Sol, and 300 of them stayed until dawn of the next day.
- May 18, 2011 – ¡Democracia real YA! set up a large tarp canopy and food stand in Puerta del Sol. Police evacuated protesters from plazas in Valencia, Tenerife, Granada and Las Palmas. The Federation of Neighbor Associations of Barcelona (FAVB) announced their support of the protests. Several key newspapers from around the world published articles about the protests. In the evening, the President of the Regional Electoral Committee of Madrid issued a statement declaring the protests illegal.
- May 20, 2011 – United Left appealed the ban on the protests before the Spanish Supreme Court, which upheld the decision. United Left announced it would appeal the decision before the Constitutional Tribunal.
- May 21, 2011 – 28,000 protesters occupied Puerta del Sol and surrounding areas. Thousands of people attended protests in other Spanish cities, and smaller protests were held in several cities across Europe.
- May 22, 2011 – The protesters in Puerta del Sol who had vowed to stay until this day decided to occupy the plaza for at least another week.
- May 24, 2011 – Representatives from ¡Democracia real YA! read a manifesto on live television. About 30 protesters entered various financial sites in the city center, vocally protesting the political and economic systems.
- May 25, 2011 – The Spanish Ministry of Defense relocated various activities for Armed Forces Day due to the ongoing occupation of Plaza de la Constitución.
- May 27, 2011 – 350 police officers used physical force to evacuate protesters from Plaça de Catalunya, resulting in 121 light injuries from baton blows. A few hours later, the protesters re-occupied the square. Similar incidents occurred in other Barcelona squares.
- June 4, 2011 – Representatives of the regional assemblies of 15M gathered in Madrid for another manifestation in Puerta del Sol.
- June 8, 2011 – Manifestations continued outside Madrid's Congreso de los Diputados. Manifestations in Valencia and Barcelona gained momentum.
- June 9, 2011 – 18 people were injured during clashes between the police and the protesters in Valencia. These clashes triggered another protest that united over 2000 people. Protests in support shook Madrid and Barcelona.
- June 15, 2011 – Thousands of people gathered outside Parc de Ciutadella, Barcelona, to protest against cuts in education funding and healthcare. The protesters tried to block the entrance to the Catalan Parliament.
- June 16, 2011 – Protests against banks' repossession of property occurred in several cities, including Parla, where dozens of people gathered outside the apartment of Luiz Dominguez, 74, and blocked the entrance against police officers and bank officials who had come to repossesses Dominguez's apartment. Similar protests happened in Tetuán and Barcelona. The manifestations spread to other parts of Europe, including the UK. In conjunction with demonstrations outside the Spanish Embassy in London (May, 21), the web-page 15M Londres was launched.
- July 1, 2011- Xavier Trias, a Spanish Catalan politician and member of Democratic Convergence of Catalonia, is sworn in as Mayor of Barcelona. Dozens gathered outside Barcelona's town hall in protest.
- July 27, 2011- Indignados start a large scale march to Brussels. Nobel Prize winner, Joseph Stiglitz, addresses the Indignados at the first 15M social forum. Police violently evict protestors camped in front of congress.
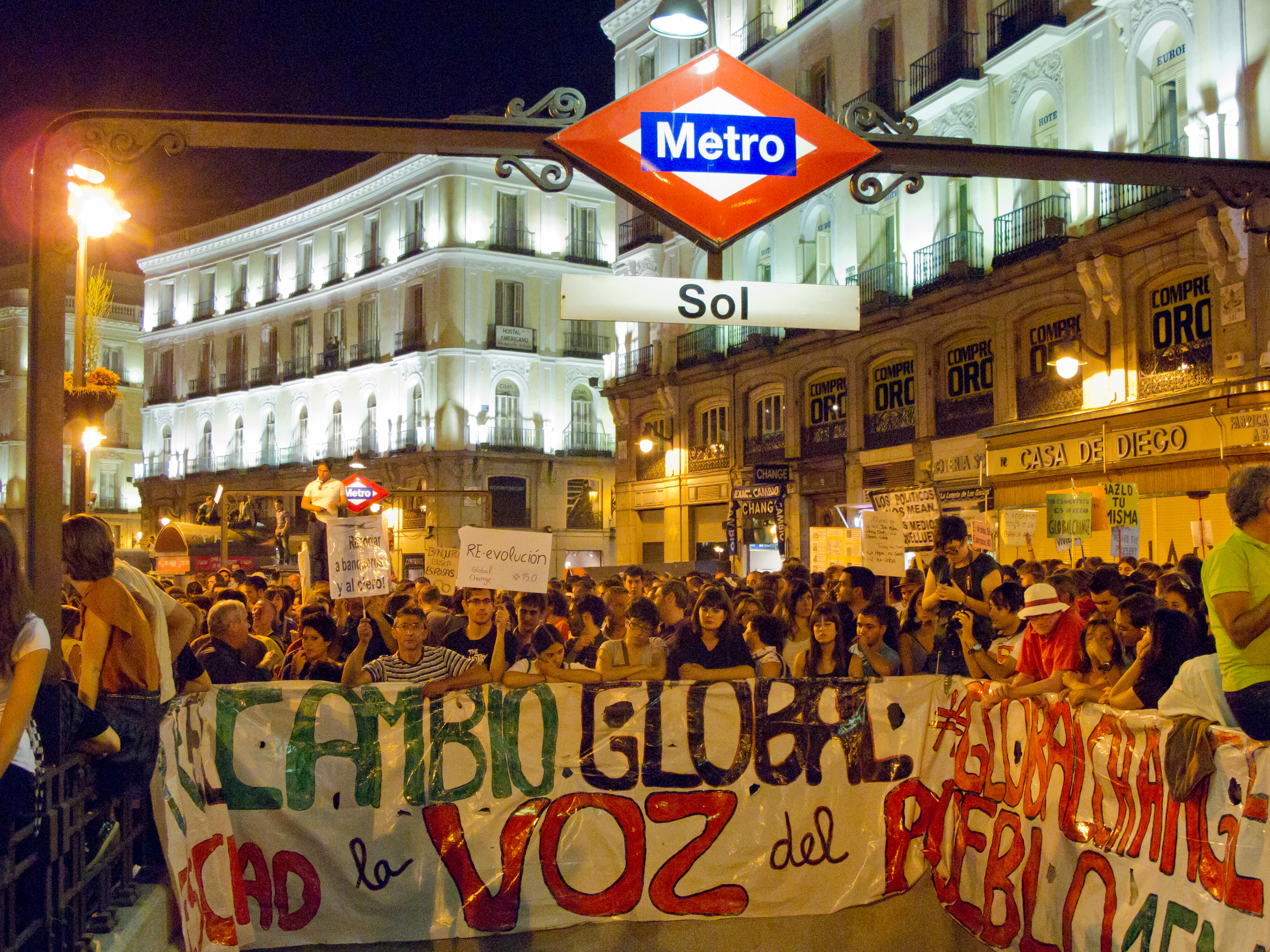
  October 15 Protests in Madrid
- September 17, 2011 – The first protests of New York City's "Occupy Wall Street" Movement march through the city, inspired by the Spanish protests and other demonstrations worldwide.
- October 15, 2011 – Peaceful protests take place in more than a thousand cities of 90 countries worldwide, inspired by the Spanish Indignados, the Arab Spring, the Greek Protests and the Occupy Wall Street movements.

== Members/participants ==
The movement is made up of individuals as well as a coalition of around 200 various grassroots organizations such as:

- NoLesVotes (Don't vote for them)
- Plataforma de Afectados por la Hipoteca (Platform of those affected by the Subprime mortgage crisis)
- Asociación Nacional de Desempleados (ADESORG) (National Association of the Unemployed)
- Juventud Sin Futuro (Youth Without A Future)
- Attac España (Global Economic Justice)
- Ecologistas en Acción (Ecologists in Action)
- Estado del Malestar (The Badfare State)
- Occupy Hispania - Iberia - Lusitania Indignados # Iberian R-Evolution & Unión União Unió Ibérica

== See also ==
- 2011 Spanish protests
- Reacts
- Real Democracy Now! (Greece)
- Time for Outrage!
