= FBI Law Enforcement Bulletin =

US FBI publication

- FBI Law Enforcement Bulletin 49, March 1980
- Subject: Law enforcement
- Language: English

Publication details
- History: 1932–present
- Publisher: Law Enforcement Communication Unit, Federal Bureau of Investigation (United States)
- Frequency: Monthly

Standard abbreviations
- ISO 4: FBI Law Enforc. Bull.

Indexing
- ISSN: 0014-5688

Links
- Journal homepage; Bulletin website

The FBI Law Enforcement Bulletin (LEB) has been published monthly since 1932 by the FBI Law Enforcement Communication Unit with articles of interest to state and local law enforcement personnel. First published in 1932 as Fugitives Wanted by Police, the FBI Law Enforcement Bulletin covers topics including law enforcement technology and issues, such as crime mapping and use of force, as well as recent criminal justice research and VICAP alerts on wanted suspects and key cases.

It was distributed to depository libraries, which were selected to receive it through v. 70 #3 (March 2001), at which GPO determined the online version provided a suitable alternative to hardcopy distribution.

The initial hard copy volume was 5,000 prints, reaching 45,000 prints with an estimate of 200,000 readers in 150 countries prior to being replaced by a digital version after December 2012.
