= React (book) =

2011 book by Rosa María Artal

- First edition (Spanish)
- Author: José Luis Sampedro; Baltasar Garzón; Federico Mayor Zaragoza; Lourdes Lucía, e.a.
- Original title: Reacciona
- Language: Spanish
- Subject: Economic crisis Politics
- Genre: essay
- Published: 2011 (Ediciones Aguilar)
- Publication place: Spain
- Pages: 176
- ISBN: 978-84-03-10200-2

React (from Spanish: Reacciona) is a book by Rosa María Artal published in Spain in 2011 by Aguilar, which compiles articles by José Luis Sampedro, Baltasar Garzón, Federico Mayor Zaragoza, Javier Pérez de Albéniz, Javier López Facal, Carlos Martínez Alonso, Ignacio Escolar, Rosa María Artal, Àngels Martínez Castells, Juan Torres Lopez and Lourdes Lucia. The book, edited by journalist Rosa María Artal, is intended to comment on the political crisis that exists in today's society - particularly in Spain - and the need for a social response to the corruption which led to the 2008 financial crisis. It emphasizes the fact that the concentrations of political powers are becoming increasingly distant from the citizenship.

== Background: Time for Outrage!, Hessel's book ==
The book was prefaced by Stéphane Hessel, author of the book Time for Outrage! originally published in France in 2010 and translated into Spanish in 2011.

== Purpose and content of the book ==
The book was written with the intention of raising awareness to the dangers that societies currently face and calls for action, participation and discourages resignation.

The collection of articles in the book React explain the current situation and show the need for a peaceful response by Spanish society to the current systemic economic, political and social crisis. Society is playing to its strength, stability and balance, especially in a generation of young people who are denied dignity, a future and a present. The 10 authors, all from different disciplines, offer their answers to an idea that unites them: the need to position themselves and to act, to become aware and react. For the authors, it is necessary that the public is informed and can take action to prevent abuses of the financial, economic and political institutions which are responsible for the crisis. The book's stated purpose is: to defend dignity, democracy and the common good.

=== Index of chapters ===
- Prologue - It is time for action - Stéphane Hessel.
- Introduction - A common objective - Rosa María Artal.
- 1- Under the carpet - José Luis Sampedro.
- 2- Go beyond the bounds of possibility - Federico Mayor Zaragoza.
- 3- Reacting to advance - Baltasar Garzón.
- 4- A crisis of truth and many lies as an answer - Juan Torres López.
- 5- Frauds that shock every day our lives. Privatization, corruption, invisibility of care ... - Angels Martínez Castells i.
- 6- The uninformed society - Rosa María Artal.
- 7- The conned generation - Ignacio School.
- 8- We must continue to renew the pantheon - Carlos Martínez Alonso | Carlos Martínez and Javier López Facal
- 9- The right to culture - Javier Pérez de Albéniz.
- 10- Something is moving - Lourdes Lucia.

== See also ==
- 2011 Spanish protests
- Time for Outrage!
- ¡Democracia Real YA!
