= High Technology Crime Investigation Association =

Cybercrime

High Technology Crime Investigation Association (HTCIA) is an international non-profit professional organization devoted to the prevention, investigation, and prosecution of crimes involving advanced technologies. Author and cybercrime expert, Christopher Brown, described HTCIA as "one of the largest and most respected" associations of its kind.

The association was formally incorporated in 1989 and "designed to encourage, promote, aid and effect the voluntary interchange of data, information, experience, ideas and knowledge about methods, processes, and techniques relating to investigations and security in advanced technologies." The association is open to law enforcement personnel, investigators, technicians or specialists and prosecuting attorneys engaged in the investigation and prosecution of criminal or civic activities in which computers and or other advanced technologies are utilized. The association is also open to security professionals whose primary duties are corporate security investigations. Average yearly membership usually exceeds 3,000. Members are located primarily in the United States, Canada, Europe and the Asia Pacific.

HTCIA members have been involved in numerous high-profile cases over the years. One of the most notable was the BTK Killer (Dennis Lynn Rader),

Numerous HTCIA members have written books on cybercrime investigations and collecting digital evidence, including, Christopher Brown, Warren G. Kruse II, Anthony Reyes, Art Bowker., Todd G. Shipley, and D. Kall Loper.

== International Training Conference & Expo ==
The group holds an annual International Training Conference & Expo each year. The conference has alternated between the East (even years) and West (odd years) coasts of the United States.
