= 2013 Bulgarian protests =

2013 Bulgarian protests may refer to one of the following:

- The 2013 Bulgarian protests against the Borisov cabinet (28 January 2013 – 16 March 2013)
- The 2013–14 Bulgarian protests against the Oresharski cabinet (14 June 2013 – 23 July 2014)
