= Liberation of France =

End of Nazi occupation during World War II

- Part of the Western Front during World War II
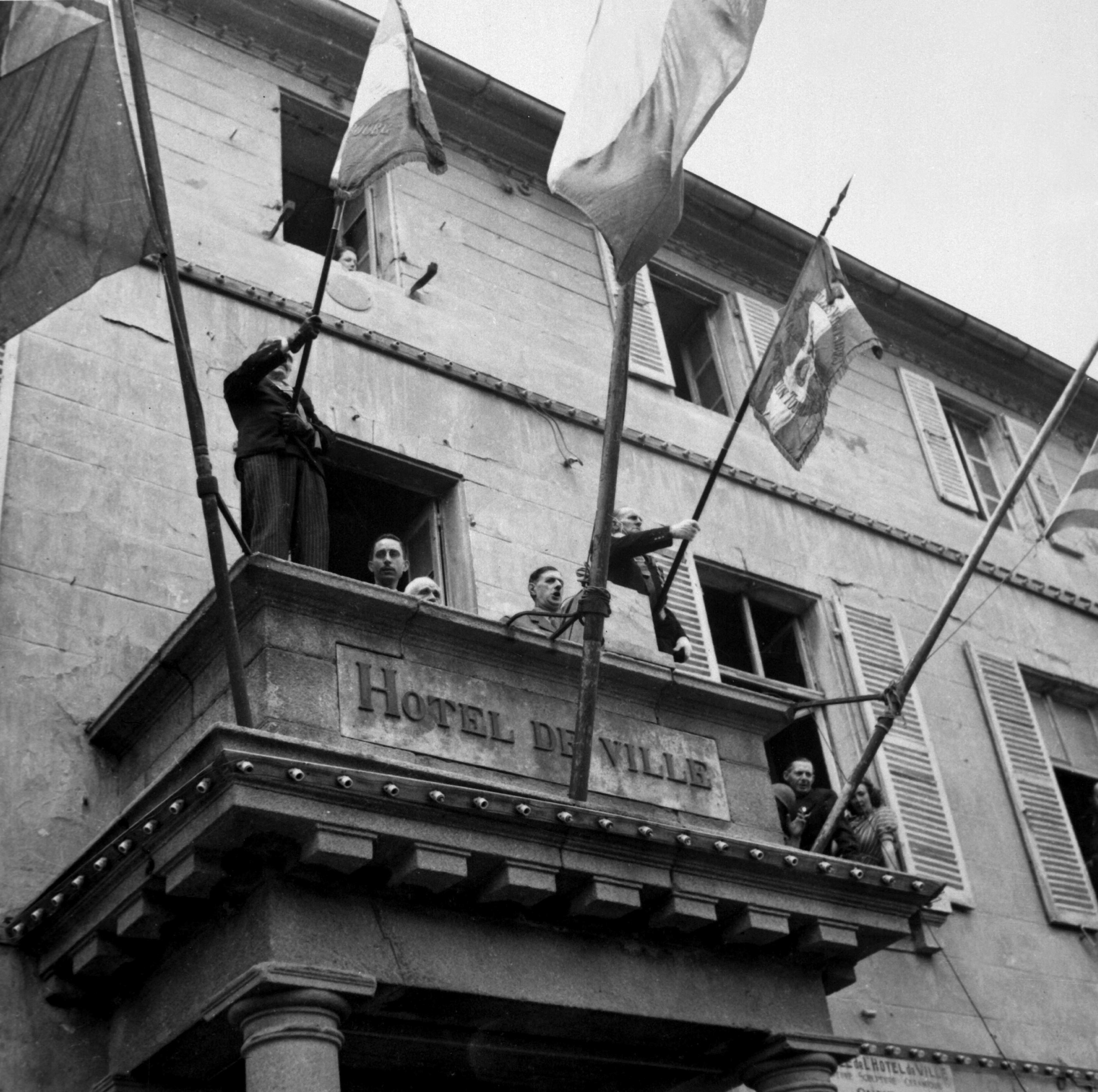
- Resistance leader Charles de Gaulle speaking from the balcony at Cherbourg City Hall, 20 August 1944
Date	6 June 1944 – 8 May 1945 (11 months and 2 days)
Location	France
Result	Allied victory

Belligerents
(Free France) French Resistance (until August 1944): Maquis; BCRA; NCR; FTP; (Free France) FFI (since August 1944) (France) PGFR (since August 1944); United States; United Kingdom; Canada; Poland; Czechoslovakia (Note: Participated in the Siege of Dunkirk.)	Germany; Vichy France (until 6 September 1944); French Governmental Commission for the Defense of National Interests (between 6 September 1944 and 23 April 1945); Italian Social Republic (until 29 April 1945)

Commanders and leaders
(United States) Franklin D. Roosevelt # (United States) Harry S. Truman (United States) Dwight D. Eisenhower (United States) George S. Patton (United Kingdom) Bernard Montgomery (United Kingdom) Winston Churchill (United Kingdom) Miles Dempsey (Canada) Harry Crerar (Canada) Guy Simonds (Provisional Government of the French Republic) Charles de Gaulle (Provisional Government of the French Republic) Jean de Lattre de Tassigny (Polish government-in-exile) Stanisław Maczek (Polish government-in-exile) Kazimierz Sosnkowski	(Nazi Germany) Adolf Hitler ‡‡ (Nazi Germany) Gerd von Rundstedt (Nazi Germany) Erwin Rommel ‡‡ (Vichy France) Joseph Darnand (Italian Social Republic) Benito Mussolini (executed) (until 28 April 1945)

The liberation of France (French: libération de la France) in the Second World War was accomplished through the combined military efforts of the Allied Powers including Free French forces in London and Africa, and the French Resistance.

Nazi Germany invaded France in May 1940. Their rapid advance through the almost undefended Ardennes caused a crisis in the French government; the French Third Republic dissolved itself in July, and handed over absolute power to Marshal Philippe Pétain, an elderly hero of World War I. Pétain signed an armistice with Germany with the north and west of France under German military occupation. Pétain, charged with calling a Constitutional Authority, instead established an authoritarian government in the spa town of Vichy, in the southern zone libre ("free zone"). Though nominally independent, Vichy France became a collaborationist regime and was little more than a Nazi client state that actively participated in Jewish deportations and aided German forces in anti-partisan actions in Occupied France as well as in combat actions in Africa.

Even before France surrendered on 22 June 1940, General Charles de Gaulle moved to London, from where he called on his fellow citizens to resist the Germans. The British recognized and funded de Gaulle's Free French government in exile based in London. Efforts to liberate France began in the autumn of 1940 in France's colonial empire in Africa, still in the hands of the Vichy regime. General de Gaulle persuaded French Chad to support Free France, and by 1943 most other French colonies in Equatorial and North Africa had followed suit. De Gaulle announced formation of the Empire Defense Council in Brazzaville, which became the capital of Free France.

Allied military efforts in north western Europe began in summer 1944 with two seaborne invasions of France. Operation Overlord in June 1944 landed two million men, including a French armored division, through the beaches of Normandy, opening a Western front against Germany. Operation Dragoon in August launched a second offensive force, including French Army B, from the département of Algeria into southern France. Allied and resistance forces reclaimed major cities as they moved into the French interior which all came to a head with the liberation of Paris on 25 August 1944. As the liberation progressed, resistance groups were incorporated into the strength of the Allied. In September, under threat of the Allied advance Pétain and the remains of the Vichy regime fled into exile in Germany. The Allied armies continued to push the Germans back through eastern France and in February and March 1945, back across the Rhine into Germany. A few pockets of German resistance remained in control of the main Atlantic ports until the end of the war on 8 May 1945.

Immediately after liberation, France was swept by a wave of executions, assaults, and degradation of suspected collaborators, including shaming of women suspected of relationships with Germans. Courts set up in June 1944 carried out an épuration légale (official purge) of officials tainted by association with Vichy or the military occupation. Some defendants received death sentences, and faced a firing squad.

The first elections since 1940 were organized in May 1945 by the Provisional Government; these municipal elections were the first in which women could vote. In referendums in October 1946, the voters approved a new constitution and the Fourth Republic was born 27 October 1946.

== Background ==
=== Fall of France ===
Nazi Germany invaded France and the Low Countries beginning on 10 May 1940. German forces split the French from their British allies by striking through the lightly defended Ardennes, whose topography French strategists had considered prohibitively difficult for tanks.

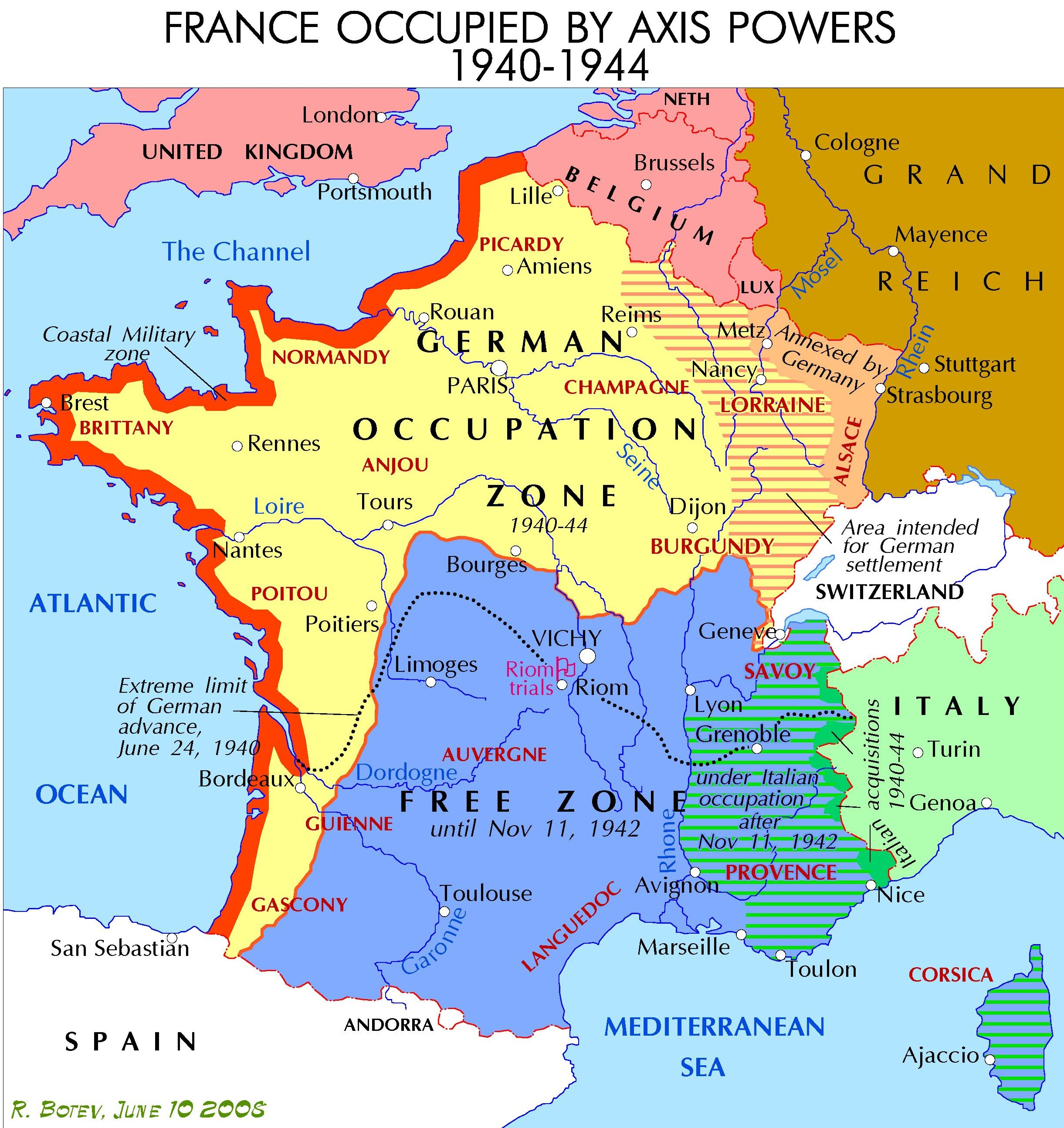
Occupied France during World War II, showing German and Italian occupation zones, the zone occupée, the zone libre, the Military Administration in Belgium and Northern France, annexed Alsace-Lorraine, the zone interdite, and the Atlantic Wall.

The invaders forced the British Expeditionary Force to evacuate, and defeated several French divisions before they advanced to Paris, and down the strategic Atlantic coast. By June, the dire French military situation had French politics revolving around whether the Third Republic should negotiate an armistice, fight on from North Africa, or just surrender. Prime Minister Paul Reynaud wanted to keep fighting, but was outvoted and resigned. The government relocated several times ahead of advancing German troops, ending up in Bordeaux. President Albert Lebrun appointed 84-year-old war hero Philippe Pétain as his replacement on 16 June 1940.

Within six weeks of the initial German assault, an overwhelmed French military faced imminent defeat. The cabinet agreed to seek peace terms and sent the Germans a delegation under General Charles Huntziger, with instructions to break off negotiations if the Germans demanded excessively harsh conditions such as the occupation of all of metropolitan France, the French fleet, or any of the French overseas territories. The Germans did not, however.

Pierre Laval, a strong proponent of collaboration, arranged a meeting between Hitler and Pétain. It took place on 24 October 1940 at Montoire on Hitler's private train. Pétain and Hitler shook hands and agreed to co-operate. The meeting was exploited in Nazi propaganda for the civilian population. On 30 October 1940, Pétain made a policy of French collaboration official, declaring in a radio statement: "I enter today on the path of collaboration." (Note: Pétain's 30 October 1940 declaration: "J'entre aujourd'hui dans la voie de la collaboration.". Likewise, on 22 June 1942, Laval declared that he was "hoping for victory for Germany".)

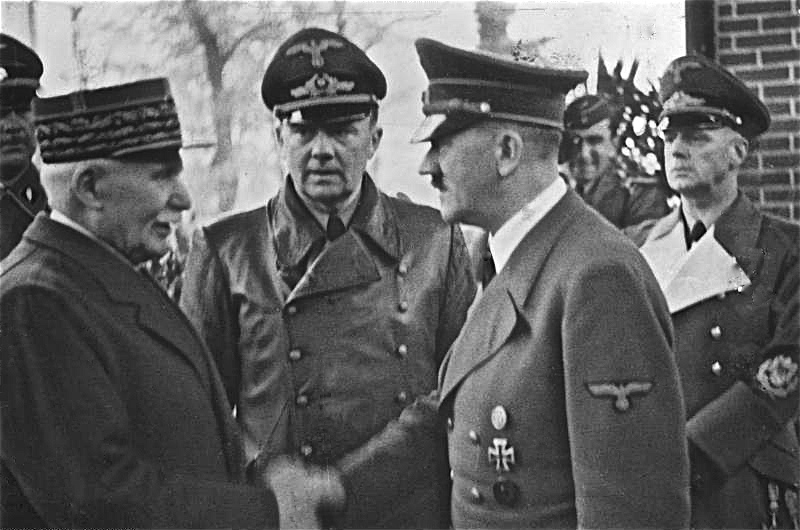
Philippe Pétain meeting Hitler on 24 October 1940. Ribbentrop on the right.

General De Gaulle, sentenced to death in absentia by the Vichy régime, escaped and created a government in exile for Free France in London. Of the sentence, he said:

"I consider the death sentence by the men of Vichy entirely void, I shall settle accounts with them after victory. The sentence is that of a court largely under the influence and possibly under the direct orders of an enemy who will one day be driven from the soil of France. Then I will submit myself willingly to the people's judgment."

=== Armistice ===
Pétain signed the Armistice of 22 June. Its terms left the French Army under Vichy France a rump Armistice Army. (Note: The Armistice Army was limited in size and materiel, and disbanded in November 1942 after Operation Anton, the German operation that took over the previously unoccupied zone libre.) The naval fleet, although disabled, remained under Vichy control. In the colonial empire, the armistice terms permitted defensive use of the naval fleet. In metropolitan France, forces were severely reduced, armored vehicles and tanks prohibited, and motorized transport severely limited.

In July, the National Assembly of the French Third Republic dissolved itself and gave absolute power to Pétain, who was to set up a constituent assembly and constitutional referendum. The "French State" created by this transfer of power was commonly known after the war as the "Vichy régime". Pétain did nothing about a constitution however, and established a totalitarian government at Vichy in the southern zone.

The Vichy régime nominally governed all of France, but in practice the zone occupée was a Nazi dictatorship and the Vichy government's power was limited and uncertain even in the zone libre. Vichy France became a collaborationist regime, little more than a Nazi client state.

France was still nominally independent, with control of the French Navy, the French colonial empire, and the southern half of its metropolitan territory. France could tell itself that it still retained some shreds of dignity. Despite heavy pressure, Vichy never joined the Axis alliance and instead, opted for neutrality. The Allies took the position that France should refrain from actively helping the Germans, but distrusted its assurances. The British attacked the French Navy at anchor in Mers-el-Kébir, to keep it out of German hands.

=== De Gaulle and Free France ===
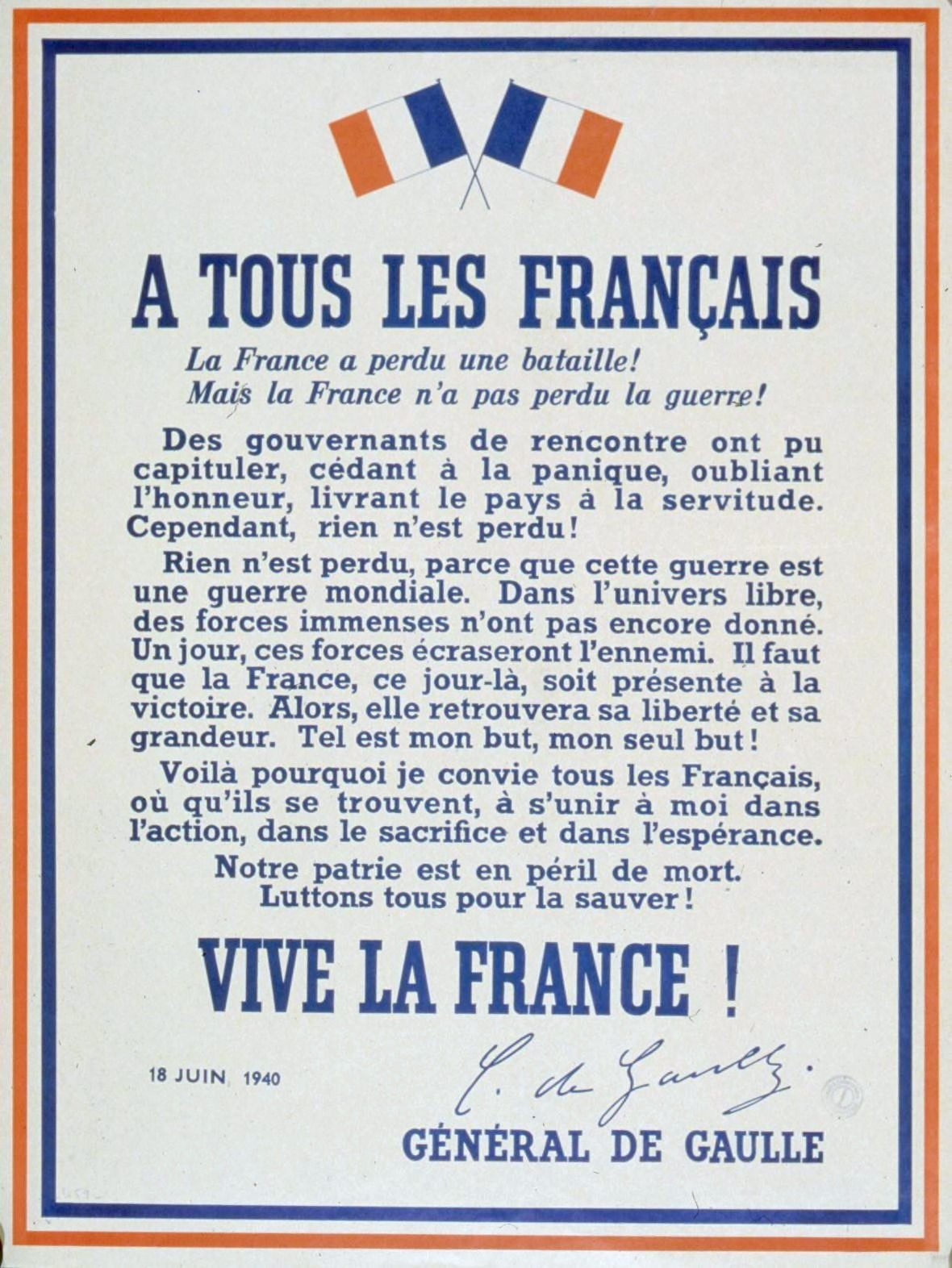
Poster of the 18 June appeal distributed in Occupied France through underground means as pamphlets and plastered on walls as posters by supporters of the Résistance.

Charles de Gaulle had been since 5 June the Under-Secretary of State for National Defence and War and responsible for coordination with Britain. Refusing to accept his government's position on Germany, he escaped back to England on 17 June. In London he established a government in exile and in a series of radio appeals exhorted the French to fight back. Some historians have called the first, his appeal of 18 June on the BBC, the beginning of the French Resistance. In fact the audience for that appeal was quite small, but more and more listened as de Gaulle obtained Britain's recognition as the legitimate government of Free France and obtained their agreement to finance a military efforts against Nazi Germany.

De Gaulle also tried, in vain initially, to gain the support of French forces in the French colonial empire. General Charles Noguès, Resident-General in Morocco and Commander-in-Chief of the Army of Africa refused his overtures, and forbade the press in French North Africa to publish the text of de Gaulle's appeal. The day after the armistice was signed on 21 June 1940, de Gaulle denounced it. The French government in Bordeaux declared de Gaulle compulsorily retired from the Army with the rank of colonel, on 23 June 1940. Also on 23 June, the British Government denounced the armistice and announced that they no longer regarded the Bordeaux government as a fully independent state. They also noted a plan to establish a French National Committee in exile, but did not mention de Gaulle by name.

The armistice took effect starting at 00:35 on 25 June. On 26 June de Gaulle wrote to Churchill about recognition for his French Committee. The Foreign Office had reservations about de Gaulle as a leader, but Churchill's envoys had tried and failed to establish contact with French leaders in North Africa, so on 28 June, the British government recognized de Gaulle as the leader of the Free French, despite the FO's reservations.

De Gaulle also initially had little success in attracting the support of major powers. While Pétain's government was recognized by the US, the USSR, and the Vatican, and controlled the French fleet and military in all the colonies, de Gaulle's retinue consisted of a secretary, three colonels, a dozen captains, a law professor, and three battalions of legionnaires who had agreed to stay in Britain and fight for him. For a time the New Hebrides were the only French colony to back de Gaulle.

De Gaulle and Churchill reached agreement on 7 August 1940 that Britain would also fund the Free French, with the costs to be settled after the war (the financial agreement was finalized in March 1941). A separate letter guaranteed the territorial integrity of the French colonial empire.

=== French Resistance ===
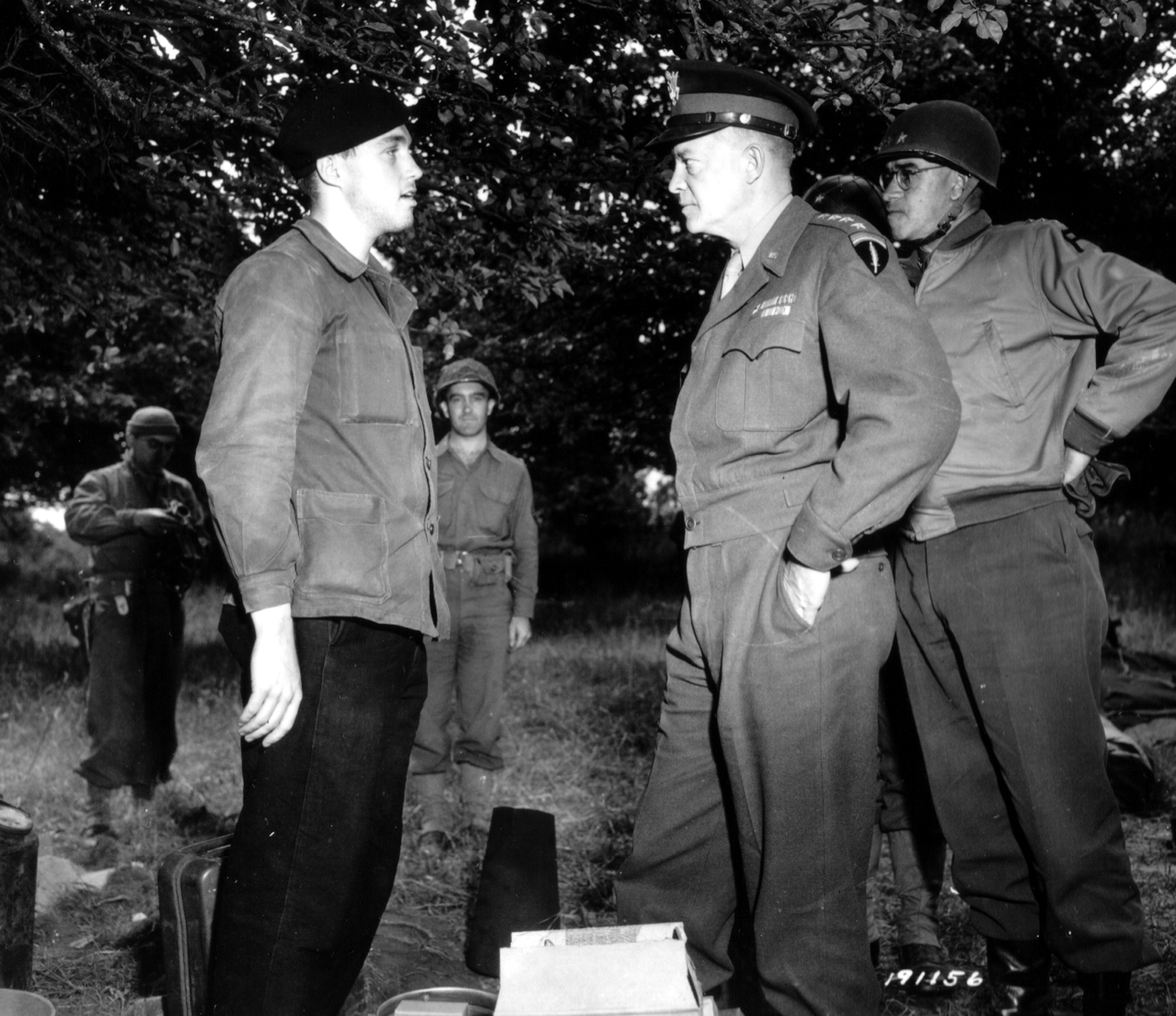
Generals Eisenhower and Bradley with a young member of the French resistance during the liberation of Lower Normandy in summer 1944

The French Resistance was a decentralized network of small cells of fighters with the tacit or overt support of many French civilians. The various resistance groups by 1944 had an estimated 100,000 members in France. Some were former Republican fighters from the Spanish Civil War; others were workers who went into hiding rather than report for the mandatory Service du travail obligatoire (STO) to work for German arms factories. (Note: Dissatisfied with the number of volunteers, the German military administration required the Government of Vichy France to enact mandatory forced labor (service de travail obligatoire (STO)), which made the occupation personal to many young French people. Able-bodied French citizens who faced forced labor in Germany began instead to disappear into forests and mountain wildernesses to join the maquis.) In the south of France especially, Resistance fighters took to the mountainous brush (maquis) that gave them their name, and conducted guerilla warfare on the German occupation forces, cutting telephone lines and destroying bridges.

The Armée Secrète was a French military organization active during World War II. The collective grouped the paramilitary formations of the three most important Gaullist resistance movements in the southern zone: Combat, Libération-sud and the Franc-Tireurs.

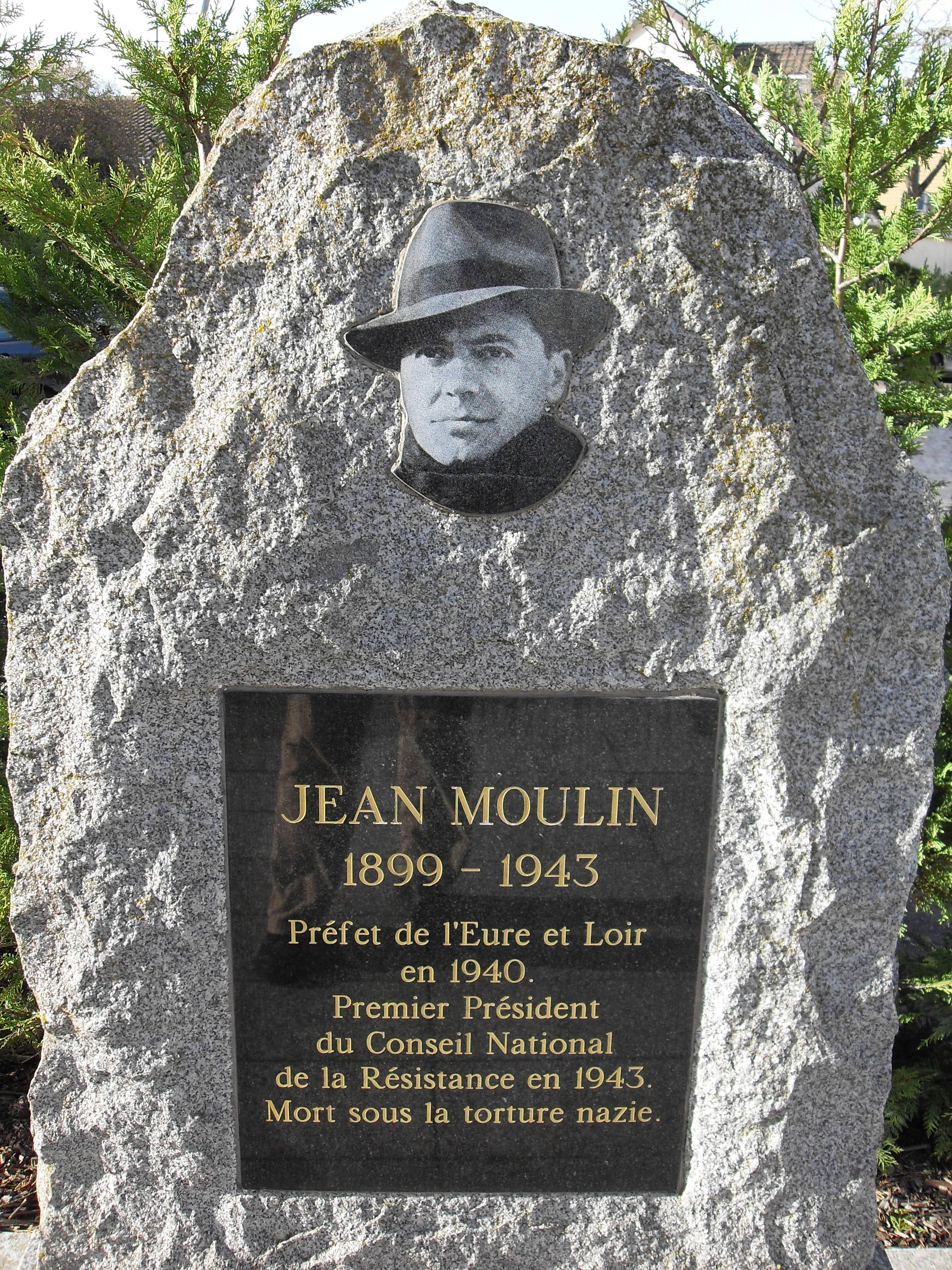
Monument to Jean Moulin, leader of the Resistance

Some organizations grew up around one of the many clandestine presses of the time, such as Combat, founded by Albert Camus, to which Jean-Paul Sartre also contributed. Stalin supported the effort once Germany invaded the Soviet Union.

French prisoners of war were held hostage against the French government meeting their quota of workers. When the mass impressment of able-bodied civilians began, French railway workers (cheminots) went on strike rather than allow the Germans to use the trains to transport them. The cheminots eventually formed their own organization, Résistance-Fer.

The French Forces of the Interior (FFI), as de Gaulle came to call Resistance forces inside France, were an uneasy alliance of several maquis and other organizations, including the Communist-organized Francs-Tireurs et Partisans (FTP) and the Armée secrète in southern France. In addition, escape networks helped Allied airmen who had been shot down get to safety. The Unione Corse and the milieu, the criminal underground of Marseilles, gleefully provided logistical escape assistance for a price, although some such as Paul Carbone instead worked with the Carlingue, French auxiliaries to the Gestapo SD and German military police.

=== French colonial empire ===
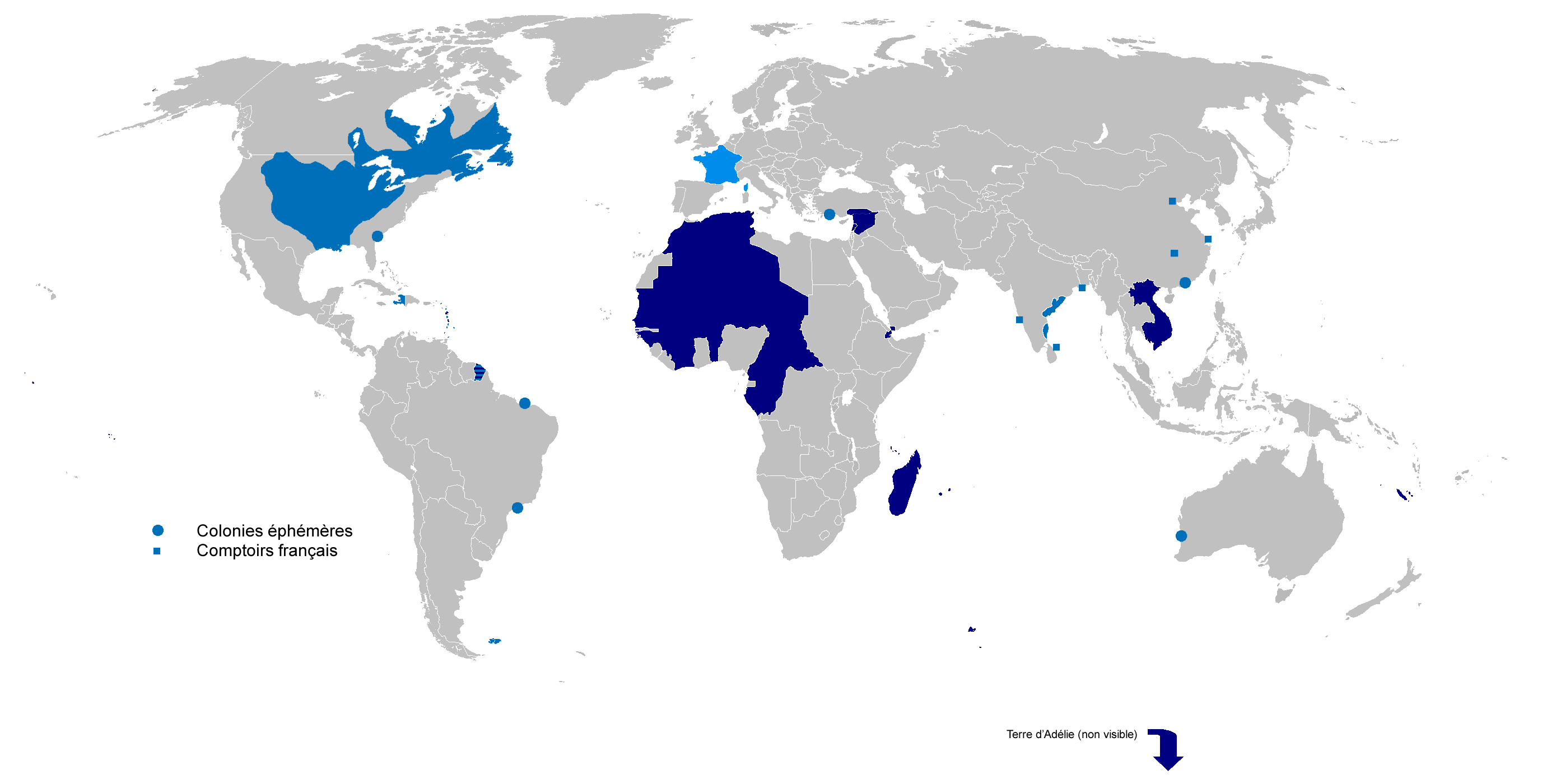
French colonial empires First Second

France's colonial empire at the start of World War II stretched from territories and possessions in Africa, the Middle East (Mandate for Syria and the Lebanon), to ports in India, Indochina, the Pacific islands, and territories in North and South America. France retained control of its colonial empire, and the terms of the armistice shifted the power balance post-armistice of France's reduced military resources away from France and towards the colonies, especially North Africa. By 1943, all French colonies, except for Japanese-controlled Indochina, had joined the Free French cause. The colonies in North Africa and French Equatorial Africa in particular played a key role

Vichy French colonial forces were reduced under the terms of the armistice. Nevertheless, in the Mediterranean area alone, Vichy had nearly 150,000 men under arms. There were about 55,000 in French Morocco, 50,000 in Algeria, and almost 40,000 in the Army of the Levant.

== Diplomacy, politics, and administration ==
=== Diplomacy and politics ===
==== Appeal of 18 June ====
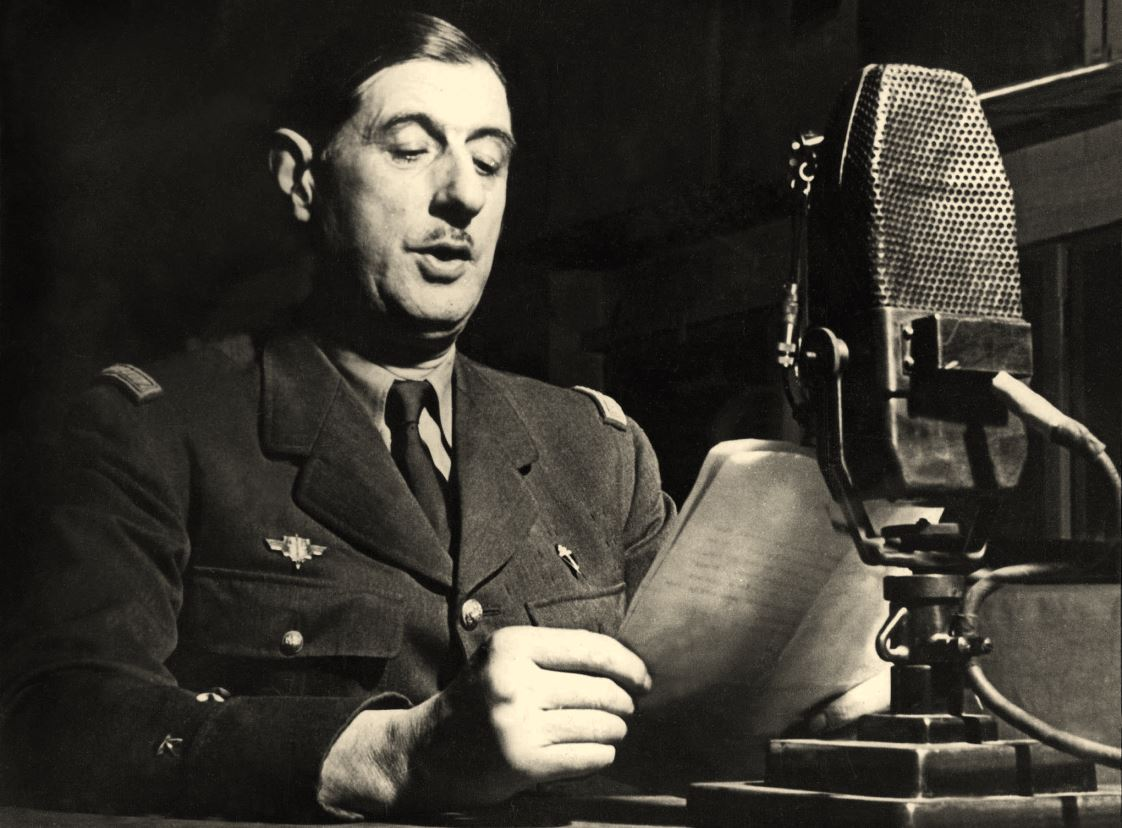
Charles de Gaulle broadcasting from the BBC in London in 1941 (Note: De Gaulle broadcasting from the BBC: There is no photograph of the June 18 appeal; this image from 1941 is sometimes used as an illustration of the famous radio speech.)

Refusing to accept his government's armistice with Germany, Charles de Gaulle fled to England on 17 June and exhorted the French to resist occupation and to continue the fight.

Reynaud resigned after his proposal for a Franco-British Union was rejected by his cabinet and De Gaulle facing imminent arrest, fled France on 17 June. Other leading politicians, including Georges Mandel, Léon Blum, Pierre Mendès France, Jean Zay and Édouard Daladier (and separately Reynaud), were arrested while travelling to continue the war from North Africa.

De Gaulle obtained special permission from Winston Churchill to broadcast a speech on 18 June via Radio Londres (a French language radio station operated by the BBC) to France, despite the Cabinet's objections that such a broadcast could provoke the Pétain government into a closer allegiance with Germany. In his speech, de Gaulle reminded the French people that the British Empire and the United States of America would support them militarily and economically in an effort to retake France from the Germans.

Few actually heard the speech but another speech, heard by more people, was given by de Gaulle four days later. After the war, de Gaulle's radio appeal was often identified as the beginning of the French Resistance, and the process of liberating France from the yoke of German occupation.

==== Northern Africa ====
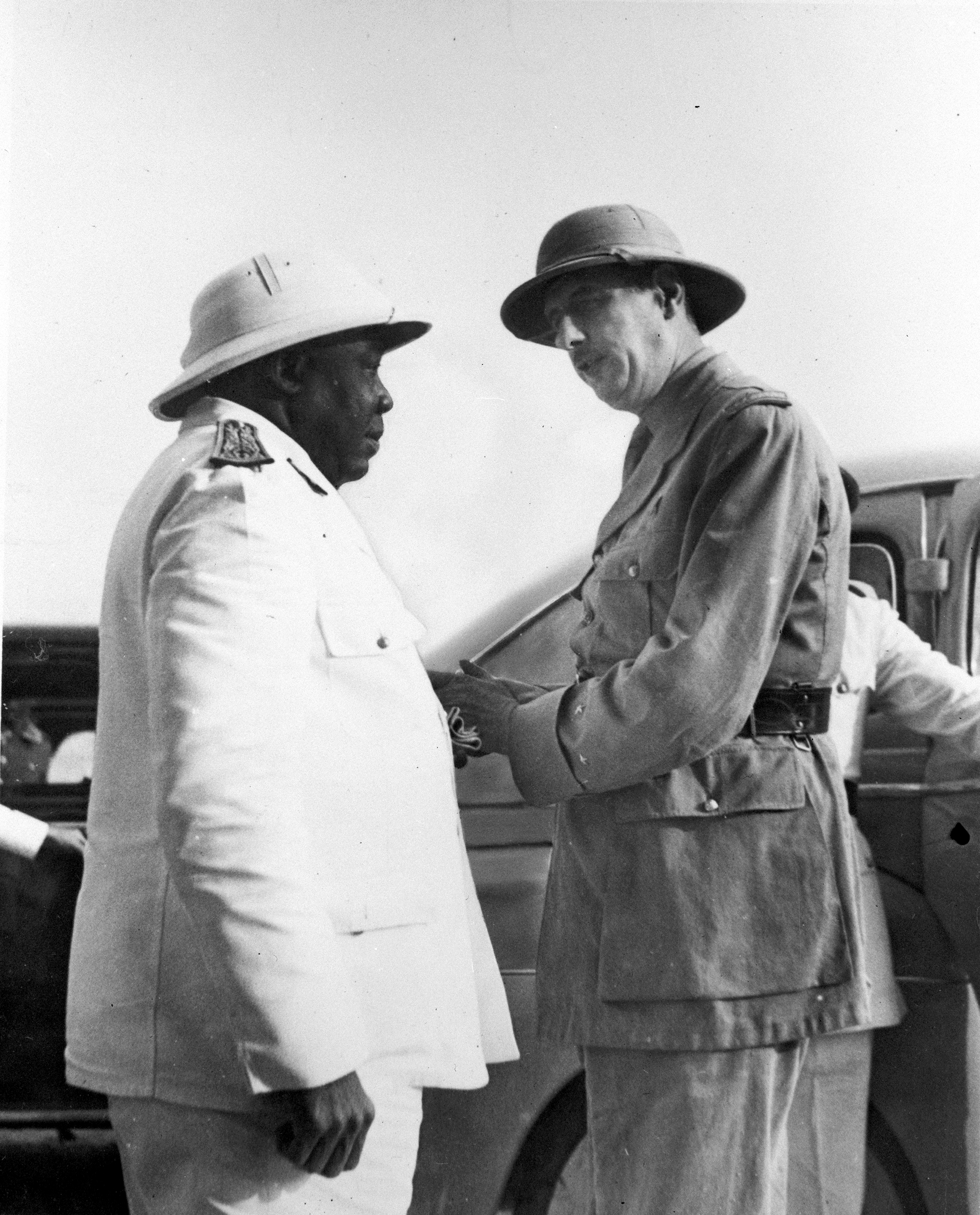
Félix Éboué welcoming de Gaulle to Chad in October 1940

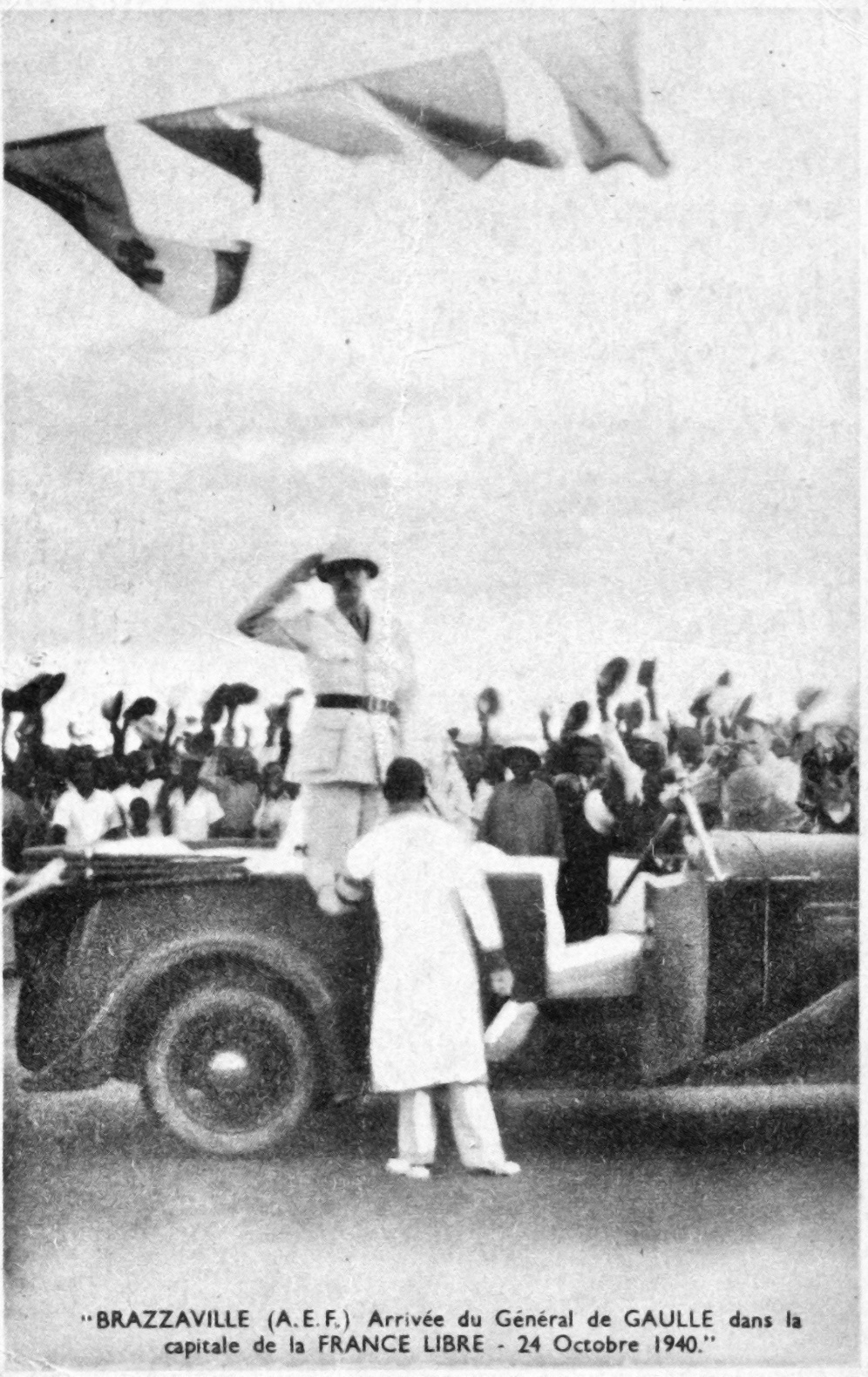

De Gaulle arriving in Brazzaville, 24 October 1940

De Gaulle's support grew out of a base in colonial Africa. In the summer of 1940, the colonial empire largely supported the Vichy regime. Félix Éboué, governor of Chad, switched his support to General de Gaulle in September. Encouraged, de Gaulle traveled to Brazzaville in October, where he announced the formation of an Empire Defense Council in his "Brazzaville Manifesto", and invited all colonies still supporting Vichy to join him and the Free French forces in the fight against Germany, which most of them did by 1943.

On 26 August, the governor and military commanders in the colony of French Chad announced that they were rallying to De Gaulle's Free French Forces. A small group of Gaullists seized control of French Cameroon the following morning, and on 28 August a Free French official ousted the pro-Vichy governor of French Congo. The next day the governor of Ubangi-Shari declared that his territory would support De Gaulle. His declaration prompted a brief struggle for power with a pro-Vichy army officer, but by the end of the day all of the colonies that formed French Equatorial Africa had rallied to Free France, except for French Gabon.

=== Free French Administration ===
A series of organizing bodies was created during the war, to guide and coordinate the diplomatic and war effort of Free France, with General Charles de Gaulle playing a central role in the creation or operation of them all.

==== Empire Defense Council ====
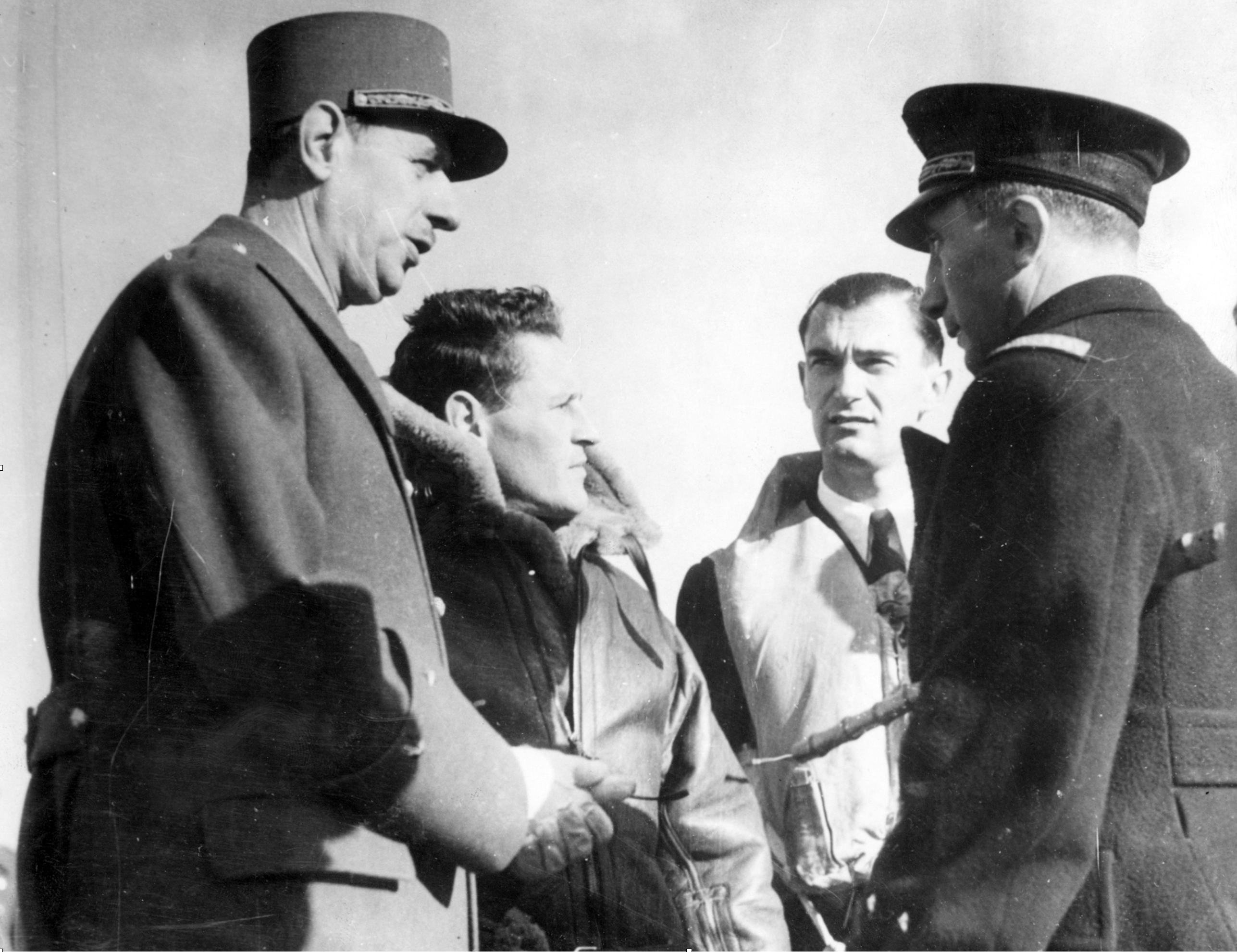
De Gaulle with Admiral Philippe de Scitivaux, pilot René Mouchotte, and Air Force general Martial Henri Valin

On 26 June 1940, four days after the Pétain government requested the armistice, General de Gaulle submitted a memorandum to the British government notifying Churchill of his decision to set up a Council of Defense of the Empire and formalizing the agreement reached with Churchill on 28 June. The formal recognition of the Empire Defense Council as a government in exile by the United Kingdom took place on 6 January 1941; recognition by the Soviet Union was published in December 1941, by exchange of letters.

==== French National Committee ====
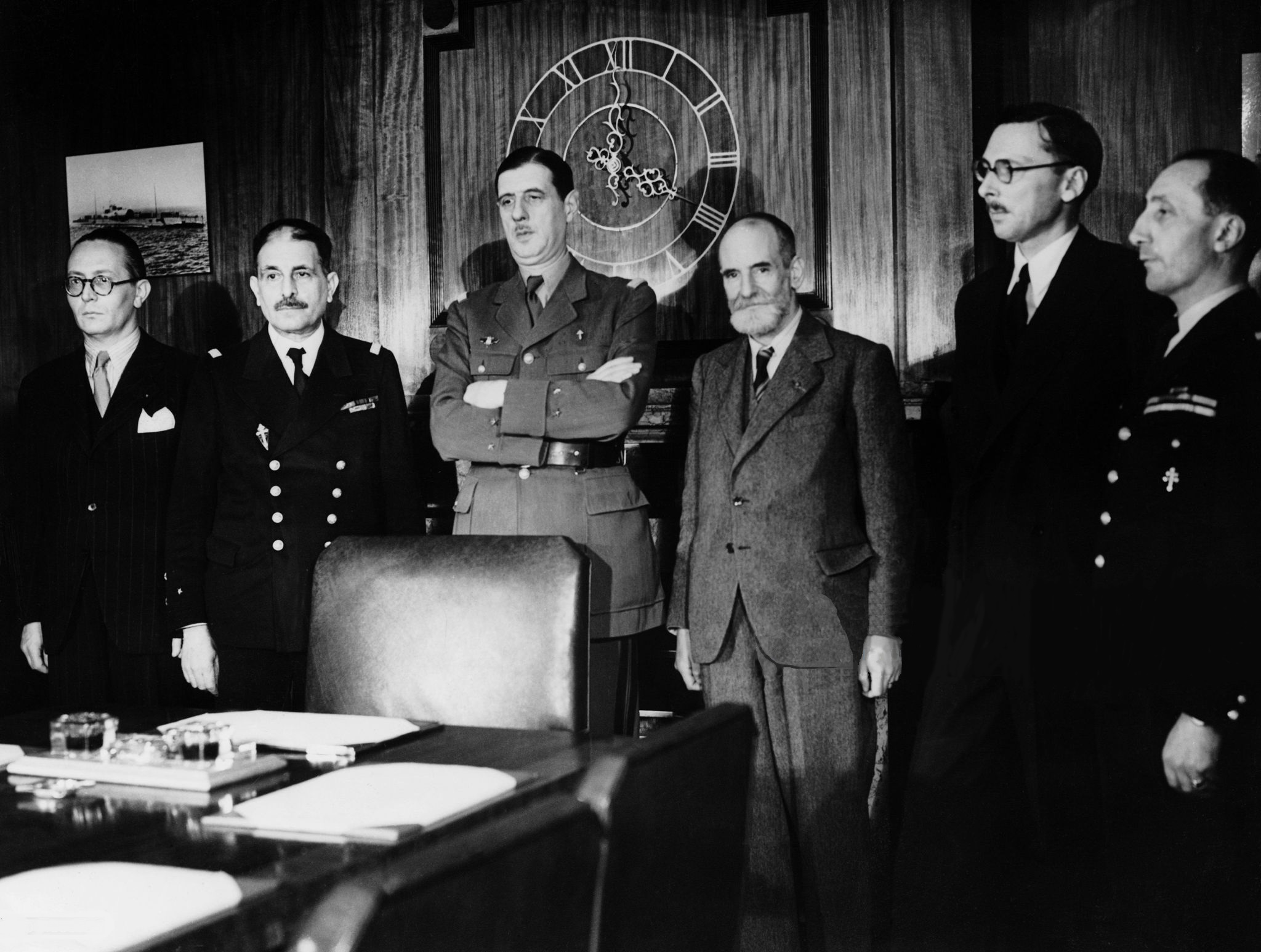
At a committee meeting in London: left to right Diethelm, Muselier, de Gaulle, Cassin, Pleven and Auboyneau (1942)

Winston Churchill suggested that de Gaulle create a committee, to lend an appearance of a more constitutionally based and less dictatorial authority and on 24 September 1941 de Gaulle created by edict the French National Committee as the successor organization to the smaller Empire Defense Council. According to historian Henri Bernard, De Gaulle went on to accept his proposal, but took care to exclude all his adversaries within the Free France movement, such as Émile Muselier, André Labarthe and others, retaining only "yes men" in the group.

The committee was the coordinating body which acted as the government-in-exile of Free France from 1941 to 1943. On 3 June 1943 it merged with the French Civil and Military High Command headed by Henri Giraud, becoming the new "French Committee of National Liberation".

==== National Resistance Council ====
De Gaulle, began seeking the formation of a committee to unify the resistance movements. On 1 January 1942, he delegated this task to Jean Moulin. Moulin achieved this on 27 May 1943, with the first meeting of the Conseil National de la Résistance in the 6th-arrondissement apartment of René Corbin on the second floor of 48, Rue du Four, in Paris.

==== French Civil and Military High Command ====
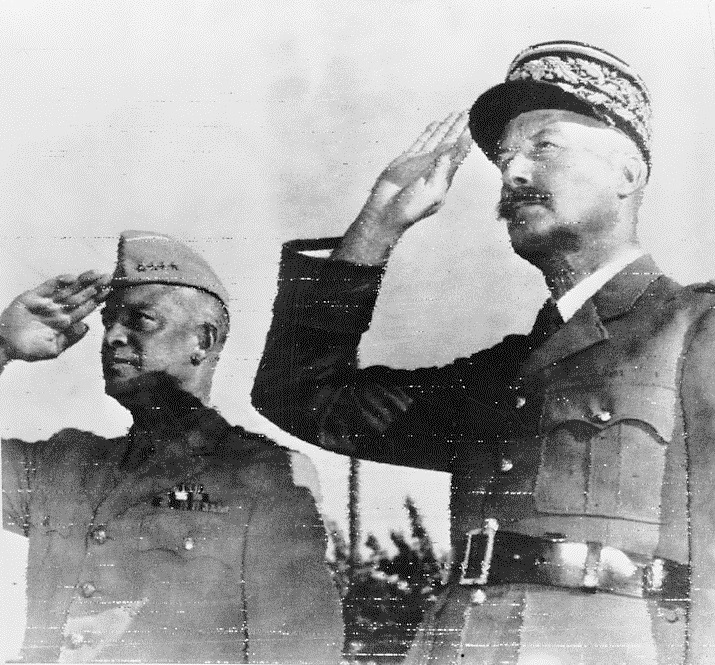
General Giraud with General Dwight D. Eisenhower at Allied headquarters in Algiers, 1943

The French Civil and Military High Command was the governmental body in Algiers headed by Henri Giraud following the liberation of a portion of French North Africa following the Allied Operation Torch landings on 7 and 8 November 1942.

François Darlan had been named by Pétain to oppose the Allied landings in North Africa in November 1942. Following the landings, Darlan supported the Allies. On 13 November, Eisenhower recognized him and named Darlan "High Commissioner of France residing in North Africa". Henri Giraud, a French patriot loyal to Vichy but opposed to Germany and who had been the Allies choice, became commander of the military forces in North Africa. First called the "High Commission of France in Africa", the French authority was rocked when on 24 December 1942, Darlan was assassinated by a Monarchist. Giraud took over and the name "Civil and Military High Command" was adopted by 1943. Giraud exercised authority over French Algeria and the French Protectorate of Morocco, while the Tunisian campaign against the Germans and Italians continued in the French Protectorate of Tunisia. Darlan having previously won the support of French West Africa, the latter was also in Giraud's camp, while French Equatorial Africa was in de Gaulle's camp.

By March 1943, North Africa began to distance itself from Vichy. On 14 March, Giraud delivered a speech that he later described as "the first democratic speech of [his] life", in which he broke with Vichy. Jean Monnet pushed Giraud to negotiate with de Gaulle, who arrived in Algiers on 30 May 1943. On 3 June, the Civil and Military High Command in Algiers merged with the French National Committee in London to form the French National Liberation Committee.

==== French Committee of National Liberation ====
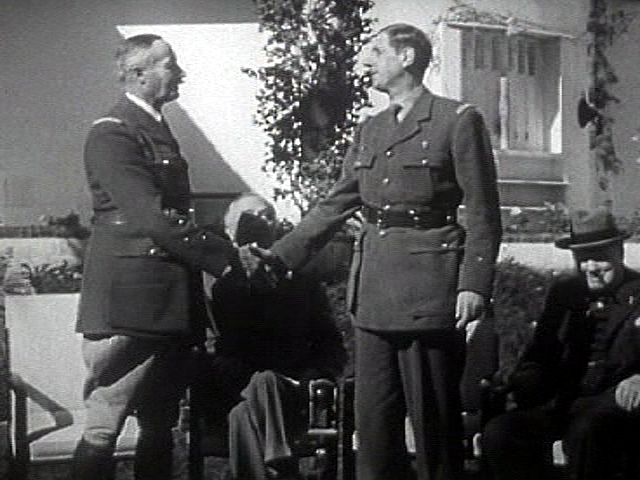
Henri Giraud and de Gaulle

The French Committee of National Liberation was a provisional government of Free France formed by generals Henri Giraud and Charles de Gaulle to provide united leadership, and organize and coordinate the campaign to liberate France. The committee was formed on 3 June 1943 and after a period of joint leadership came under the chairmanship of de Gaulle on 9 November. The committee directly challenged the legitimacy of the Vichy régime and unified the French forces that fought against the Nazis and their collaborators. The committee functioned as a provisional government for French Algeria (then a part of metropolitan France) and the liberated parts of the colonial empire.

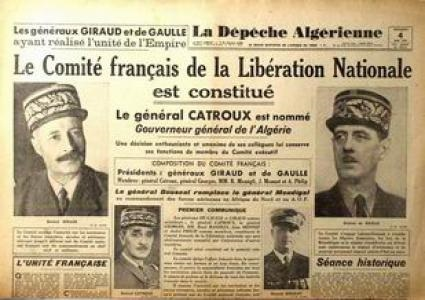
First page of La Dépêche algérienne headlining the creation of the French Committee of National Liberation 4 June 1943

The committee was formed on 3 June 1943 in Algiers, the capital of French Algeria. Giraud and de Gaulle served jointly as co-presidents of the committee. The charter of the body affirmed its commitment to "re-establish all French liberties, the laws of the Republic and the Republican régime." The committee saw itself as a source of unity and representation for the French nation. The Vichy regime was decried as illegitimate over its collaboration with Nazi Germany. The committee received mixed responses from the Allies; the U.S. considered it a war-time body with restricted functions, different from a future government of liberated France. The Committee soon expanded its membership, developed a distinctive administrative body and incorporated as the Provisional Consultative Assembly, creating an organized, representative government within itself. With Allied recognition, the committee and its leaders Giraud and de Gaulle enjoyed considerable popular support within France and the French resistance, thus becoming the forerunners in the process to form a provisional government for France as liberation approached. However, Charles de Gaulle politically outmaneuvered Gen. Giraud, and asserted complete control and leadership over the committee.

In September, Allied forces recognized the committee as the legitimate provisional government of France, whereupon the Committee reorganized itself as the Provisional Government of the French Republic under the presidency of Charles de Gaulle and began the process of writing a new Constitution which would become the basis of the French Fourth Republic.

==== Provisional Consultative Assembly ====
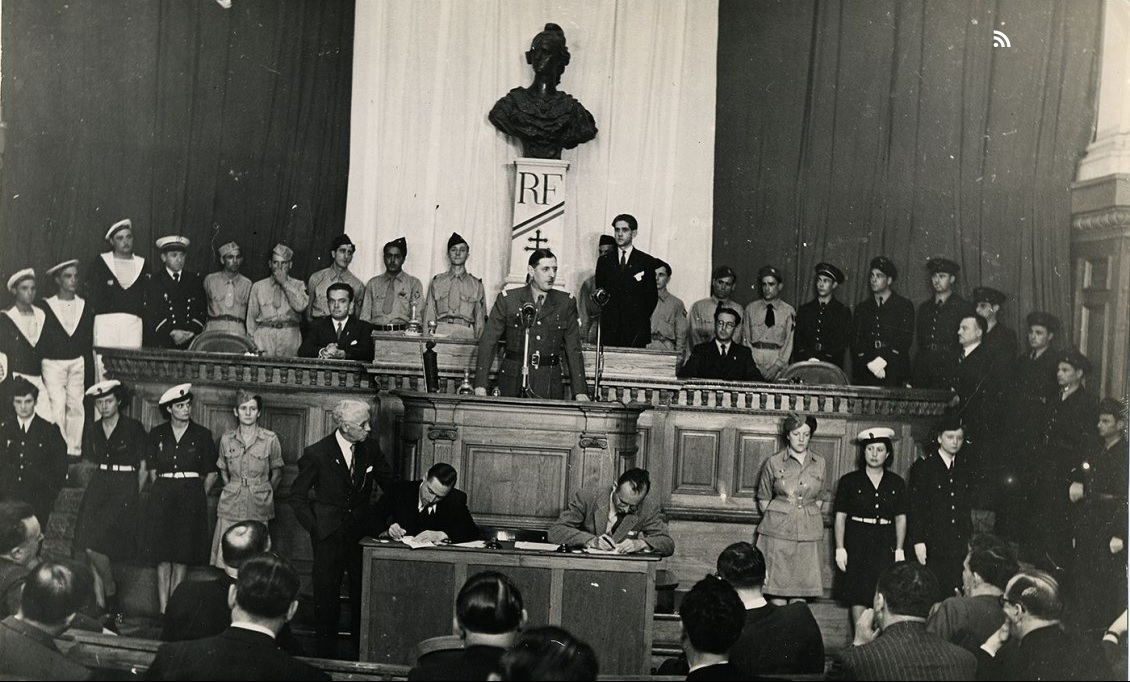
Inaugural session of the Provisional Consultative Assembly in the presence of General de Gaulle. Palais Carnot, Algiers, 3 November 1943

The Provisional Consultative Assembly was set up in September 1943 in Algiers to advise the committee and to help provide a legal basis to the institutions being set up to represent the French people, at a time when the country itself and its laws represented the enemy. After the liberation of Paris in August 1944, the Committee moved to Paris and was reorganized as the Provisional Government of the French Republic under the presidency of Charles de Gaulle. The Provisional Government guided the French war and diplomatic efforts through liberation and the end of the war, until a new Constitution was written and approved in a referendum, establishing of the Fourth Republic in October 1946.

The Provisional Consultative Assembly was a governmental organ of Free France that was created by and operated under the aegis of the French Committee of National Liberation (CFLN). It began in north Africa and held meetings in Algiers until it moved to Paris in July 1944. Led by Charles de Gaulle, it was an attempt to provide some sort of representative, democratic accountability to the institutions being set up to represent the French people, at a time when the country itself and its laws were dissolved and its territory occupied or coopted by a puppet state.

The members of the Assembly represented the French resistance movements, political parties, and territories that were engaged against Germany in the Second World War alongside the Allies.

Established by ordinance on 17 September 1943 by the CFLN, it held its first meetings in Algiers, at the Palais Carnot (the former headquarters of the Financial Delegations), between 3 November 1943 and 25 July 1944. On 3 June 1944 it was placed under the authority of the Provisional Government of the French Republic (GPRF), which succeeded the CFLN.

In his inaugural speech, de Gaulle gave the body his imprimatur, as providing a means of representing the people of France as democratically and legally as possible under difficult and unparalleled circumstances, until such time as democracy could once again be restored. As an indication of the importance he attached to the body, de Gaulle participated in about twenty sessions of the Consultative Assembly in Algiers. On 26 June 1944, he came to report on the military situation after the D-Day landings, and on 25 July, he was present at its last session on African soil before its move to Paris.

Restructured and expanded after the liberation of France, it held sessions in Paris at the Palais du Luxembourg between 7 November 1944 and 3 August 1945.

==== Provisional Government ====
The GPFR served as an interim government of Free France from June 1944 through liberation and lasted till 1946.

The PGFR was created by the Committee of National Liberation on 3 June 1944, three days before D-day. It moved back to Paris after the liberation of the capital in August 1944.

Most of the goals and activity of the GPFR are related to the post-Liberation period, so this subtopic is covered in more detail in the Aftermath section below, in section Provisional Government of the French Republic.

== Military forces ==
=== Introduction ===
The first military forces brought to bear in the liberation of France were the forces of Free France, made up of colonial regiments from French Africa. The Free French forces included 300,000 North African Arabs. Two of the Big Three Allies, the United States and the United Kingdom, were next with Operation Overlord, with Australian air support and Canadian infantry in the Normandy beach landings.

Individual civilian efforts such as the Maquis de Saint-Marcel helped to harass the Germans. An OSE operation hid Allied servicemen. The many scattered cells of the French Resistance gradually consolidated into a fighting force after the Normandy landings and became known as the French Forces of the Interior (FFI). The FFI made major contributions, assisting Allied armies pushing the Germans east out of France and past the Rhine.

The military forces involved in the liberation of France were under the command of General Dwight D. Eisenhower, Supreme Allied Commander of the Supreme Headquarters Allied Expeditionary Force (SHAEF). General Bernard Montgomery was named commander of the 21st Army Group, which comprised all of the land forces involved in the initial invasion. On 31 December 1943, Eisenhower and Montgomery first saw the outline plan the Chief of Staff to the Supreme Allied Commander (COSSAC) had prepared for an invasion, which proposed amphibious landings by three divisions, with two more divisions in support. The two generals immediately insisted on expanding the scale of the initial invasion to five divisions, with airborne descents by three additional divisions, to allow operations on a wider front and to speed up the capture of the port at Cherbourg. The need to acquire or produce extra landing craft for the expanded operation meant delaying the invasion until June 1944. Eventually the Allies committed 39 divisions to the Battle of Normandy: 22 American, 12 British, three Canadian, one Polish, and one French, totalling over a million troops, all under overall British command under Montgomery's 21st Army Group. (Note: The British 79th Armoured Division never operated as a single formation (Buckley 2006, p. 13) but was an operational grouping of all the specialised armoured vehicles committed to solve the particular problems of the German defences of the Atlantic Wall and thus has been excluded from the total. In addition, a combined total of 16 (three from the 79th Armoured Division) British, Belgian, Canadian, and Dutch independent brigades were committed to the operation, along with four battalions of the Special Air Service (Ellis, Allen & Warhurst 2004, pp. 521–523, 524).)

=== Free French Forces ===
Despite de Gaulle's call to continue the struggle, few French forces initially pledged their support. By the end of July 1940, only about 7,000 soldiers had joined the Free French Forces in England. Three-quarters of French servicemen in Britain requested repatriation.

France was bitterly divided by the conflict. Frenchmen everywhere were forced to choose sides, and often deeply resented those who had made a different choice. One French admiral, René-Émile Godfroy, voiced the opinion of many of those who decided not to join the Free French forces, when in June 1940 he explained to the exasperated British why he would not order his ships from their Alexandria harbour to join de Gaulle:

"For us Frenchmen, the fact is that a government still exists in France, a government supported by a Parliament established in non-occupied territory and which in consequence cannot be considered irregular or deposed. The establishment elsewhere of another government, and all support for this other government would clearly be rebellion."

Equally, few Frenchmen believed that Britain could stand alone. In June 1940, Pétain and his generals told Churchill that "in three weeks, England will have her neck wrung like a chicken". Of France's far-flung empire, only the 43 acres of French territory of the British island of St Helena (on 23 June at the initiative of Georges Colin, honorary consul of the domains) and the Franco-British ruled New Hebrides in the Pacific (on 20 July) answered De Gaulle's call to arms. It was not until late August that Free France would gain significant support in French Equatorial Africa.

Unlike the troops at Dunkirk or naval forces at sea, relatively few members of the French Air Force had the means or opportunity to escape. Like all military personnel trapped on the mainland, they were functionally subject to the Pétain government: "French authorities made it clear that those who acted on their own initiative would be classed as deserters, and guards were placed to thwart efforts to get on board ships." In the summer of 1940, around a dozen pilots made it to England and volunteered for the RAF to help fight the Luftwaffe. Many more, however, made their way through long and circuitous routes to Spain or to French territories overseas, eventually regrouping as the Free French Air Force.

The French Navy was better able to immediately respond to de Gaulle's call to arms. Most units initially stayed loyal to Vichy, but about 3,600 sailors operating 50 ships around the world joined with the Royal Navy and formed the nucleus of the Free French Naval Forces (FFNF; in French Forces Navales Françaises Libres: FNFL). France's surrender found her only aircraft carrier, Béarn, en route from the United States loaded with American fighter and bomber aircraft. Unwilling to return to occupied France, but likewise reluctant to join de Gaulle, Béarn instead sought harbour in Martinique, her crew showing little inclination to side with the British in their continued fight against the Nazis. Already obsolete at the start of the war, she remained in Martinique for the next four years, her aircraft rusting in the tropical climate.

Many men in the French colonies felt a special need to defend France, and eventually made up two-thirds of de Gaulle's Free French Forces. Among these volunteers, influential psychiatrist and decolonial philosopher Frantz Fanon from Martinique joined de Gaulle's troops at the age of 18, despite being deemed a 'dissenter' by Martinique's Vichy-controlled colonial government for doing so.

=== Colonial African forces ===
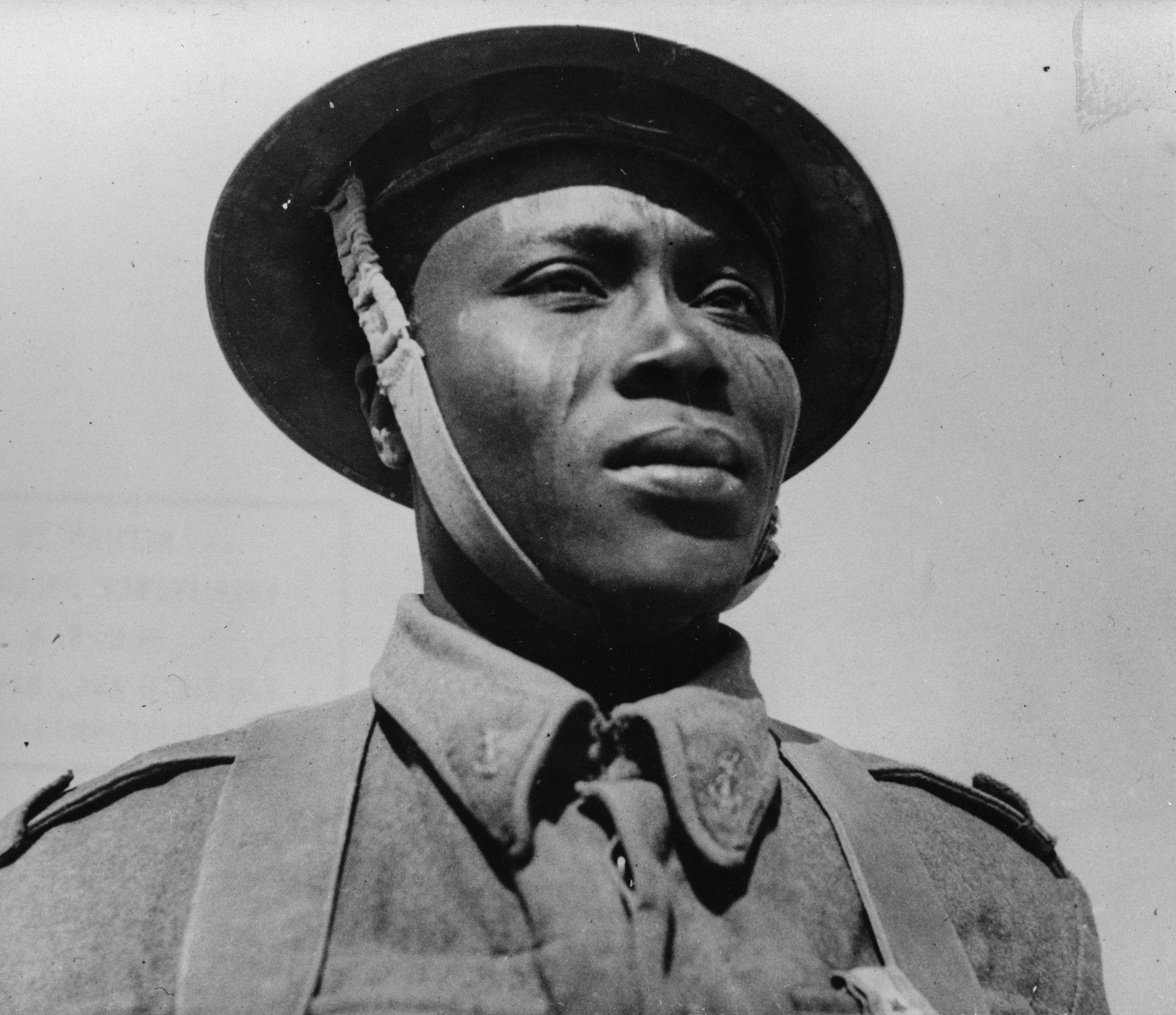
A Free French soldier from French Chad, recipient of the Croix de Guerre

The contribution to France's liberation made by African colonial soldiers, who comprised 9% of the French army, was long overlooked. The North African units, dating from 1830 and grouped into the XIX Army Corps in 1873, formed part of the French Metropolitan Army. De Gaulle made a base in African territory, from which he launched the military liberation. African troops who made the largest contribution by colonial troops to the liberation.

On the eve of the Second World War, five regiments of Tirailleurs Sénégalais were stationed in France in addition to a brigade based in Algeria. The 2e division colonial senegalaise was permanently deployed in the south of France due to the potential threat of invasion from Italy.

The Armée d'Afrique (Army of Africa) was formally a separate army corps of the French metropolitan army, the 19th Army Corps (19e Corps d'Armée) so named in 1873. The French Colonial Forces on the other hand came under the Ministry of the Navy and comprised both French and indigenous units serving in Sub-Saharan Africa and elsewhere in the French colonial empire.

=== Intelligence ===
De Gaulle set up his Free French intelligence system to combine both military and political roles, including covert operations. He selected journalist Pierre Brossolette (1903–44) to head the Bureau Central de Renseignements et d'Action (BCRA). The policy was reversed in 1943 by Emmanuel d'Astrier, the interior minister of the exile government, who insisted on civilian control of political intelligence.

=== Allied forces ===
The "Big Three" Allies of World War II, the Soviet Union, the United Kingdom and the United States, all fought Germany in World War II, but Soviet Union fighting on the Eastern Front played no direct role in the liberation of France, but the second front contributed to Nazi defeat.

The United Kingdom and the United States fought on the Western Front, with contributions from Canadian and Australian soldiers who landed in Normandy on D-Day, as well as Australian air support.

=== French Forces of the Interior ===
French Forces of the Interior was the formal name given by General de Gaulle to French resistance fighters in the later stages of the war; the change occurred as France, the occupied nation, became France, being liberated by the Allied armies. Regional maquis became more formally organized into FFI light infantry and served as a valuable additional manpower for the regular Free French forces.

After the invasion of Normandy in June 1944, at the request of the French Committee of National Liberation, SHAEF placed about 200,000 resistance fighters under the command of General Marie Pierre Kœnig on 23 June 1944 who attempted to unify resistance efforts against the Germans. General Eisenhower confirmed Koenig's command of the FFI .

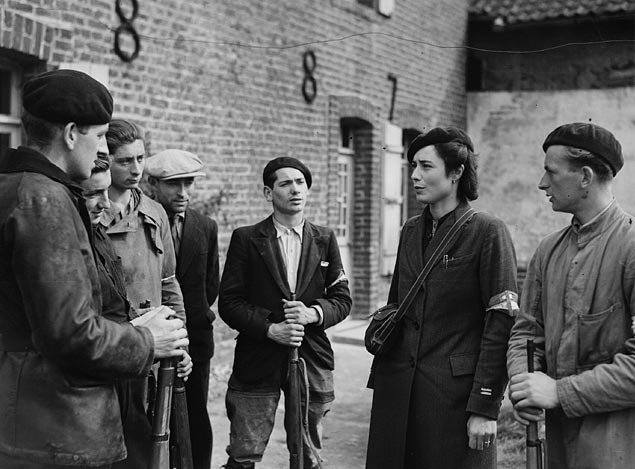
Members of the Maquis, 14 September 1944

The FFI were mostly composed of resistance fighters who used their own weapons, although many FFI units included former French soldiers. They used civilian clothing and wore an armband with the letters "F.F.I."

According to General Patton, the rapid advance of his army through France would have been impossible without the fighting aid of the FFI. General Patch estimated that from the time of the Mediterranean landings to the arrival of U.S. troops at Dijon, the help given to the operations by the FFI was equivalent to four full divisions.

FFI units seized bridges, began the liberation of villages and towns as Allied units neared, and collected intelligence on German units in the areas entered by the Allied forces, easing the Allied advance through France in August 1944. According to a volume of the U.S. official history of the war,

In Brittany, southern France, and the area of the Loire and Paris, French Resistance forces greatly aided the pursuit to the Seine in August. Specifically, they supported the U.S. Third Army in Brittany and the Seventh U.S. and First French Armies in the southern beachhead and the Rhône valley. In the advance to the Seine, the French Forces of the Interior helped protect the southern flank of the Third Army by interfering with enemy railroad and highway movements and enemy telecommunications, by developing open resistance on as wide a scale as possible, by providing tactical intelligence, by preserving installations of value to the Allied forces, and by mopping up bypassed enemy positions.

As regions of France were liberated, the FFI provided a ready pool of semi-trained manpower with which France could rebuild the French Army. Estimated to have a strength of 100,000 in June 1944, the strength of the FFI grew rapidly, doubling by July 1944, and reaching 400,000 by October 1944. Although the amalgamation of the FFI was in some cases fraught with political difficulty, it was ultimately successful and allowed France to re-establish a reasonably large army of 1.3 million men by VE Day.

==== Escape lines ====
Approximately 2,000 British and 3,000 American airmen downed in western Europe evaded German capture during the war. Airmen were assisted by many different escape lines, some of them large and organized, others informal and ephemeral. The Royal Air Forces Escaping Society estimated that 14,000 volunteers worked with the many escape and evasion lines during the war. Many others helped on an occasional basis, and the total number of people who, on one or more occasions helped downed airmen during the war, may have reached 100,000. One-half of the volunteer helpers were women, often young women, even teenagers.

Escape and evasion lines created by the Allies specifically to assist their men, such as the Shelbourne or the Burgundy lines or those created by servicemen at large in occupied territory, such as the Pat O'Leary Line, usually focused on helping Allied servicemen. Other escape lines, grass-roots efforts by civilians to help those fleeing the Nazis, such as the Comet, Dutch-Paris, Service EVA or the Smit-van der Heijden lines, also helped servicemen but also compromised spies, resisters, men evading the forced labor impressments, civilians who wanted to join the governments-in-exile in London, and fleeing Jews.

==== Premature activation ====
In the uplands and forests, considerable numbers of resistance fighters gathered, known as maquisards because of the maquis shrubland that sheltered them. These "redoubts" of FFI fighters initially kept a low profile, since overt acts of sabotage resulted in savage reprisals by German forces, or direct military action on a large scale. On 26 March 1944, the Maquis des Glières in Haute-Savoie were defeated by more than 3,000 troops followed by shootings and burnings of farms amongst the local population.

Excluded from the planning for the Normandy Landings, de Gaulle and his staff devised an operation called Plan Caïman in which French paratroopers would join the maquisards of the Massif Central to liberate the surrounding area and from there establish contact with the invading British and US forces. The Allied planners rejected the plan on the grounds that they would not have the resources to support it. On 20 May 1944, the Maquis du Mont Mouchet in the Massif Central staged an open uprising on its own initiative and was crushed within three weeks with the usual reprisals. Despite this, on 6 June, de Gaulle broadcast an impassioned call to arms to the French people on the BBC, which the maquisards interpreted as a signal for overt action; a lower-key message from Eisenhower to avoid a "premature uprising" was widely ignored. As a direct consequence, in July the 4,000 FFI on the Vercors Plateau near Grenoble were attacked by a German force of 10,000 including paratroopers and troops in gliders. In the Battle of Vercors, the lightly armed French defences were overwhelmed, despite assistance from Allied agents, air-drops and special forces.

== Allied military policy ==
Military strategy for the war as a whole was discussed among the Big Three powers, and especially among the United Kingdom and the United States, who were especially close, with numerous calls and meetings held between U.S. President Franklin D. Roosevelt and British Prime Minister Winston Churchill. In addition, the leaders of the Big Three met at conferences during the war to decide on overall military strategy.

The Arcadia Conference held in Washington, D.C. from 22 December 1941, to 14 January 1942, followed the American and the British declarations of war on Japan; Japan's allies, Germany and Italy, had just declared war on the United States. The main policy decisions of Arcadia included the "Germany First" (also known as "Europe first") policy that the defeat of Germany had higher priority than the war with Japan.

The Second Washington Conference in June 1942 confirmed a decision not to open a second front in France but to first invade French North Africa as part of a joint Mediterranean strategy for an attack on Italy (described as the "soft under-belly" of the Axis).

The decision to undertake a cross-channel invasion in 1944 was taken at the Trident Conference in Washington in May 1943. General Eisenhower was appointed commander of SHAEF and General Bernard Montgomery was named as commander of the 21st Army Group, which comprised all the land forces involved in the invasion. The coast of Normandy in northwestern France was chosen as the site of the invasion.

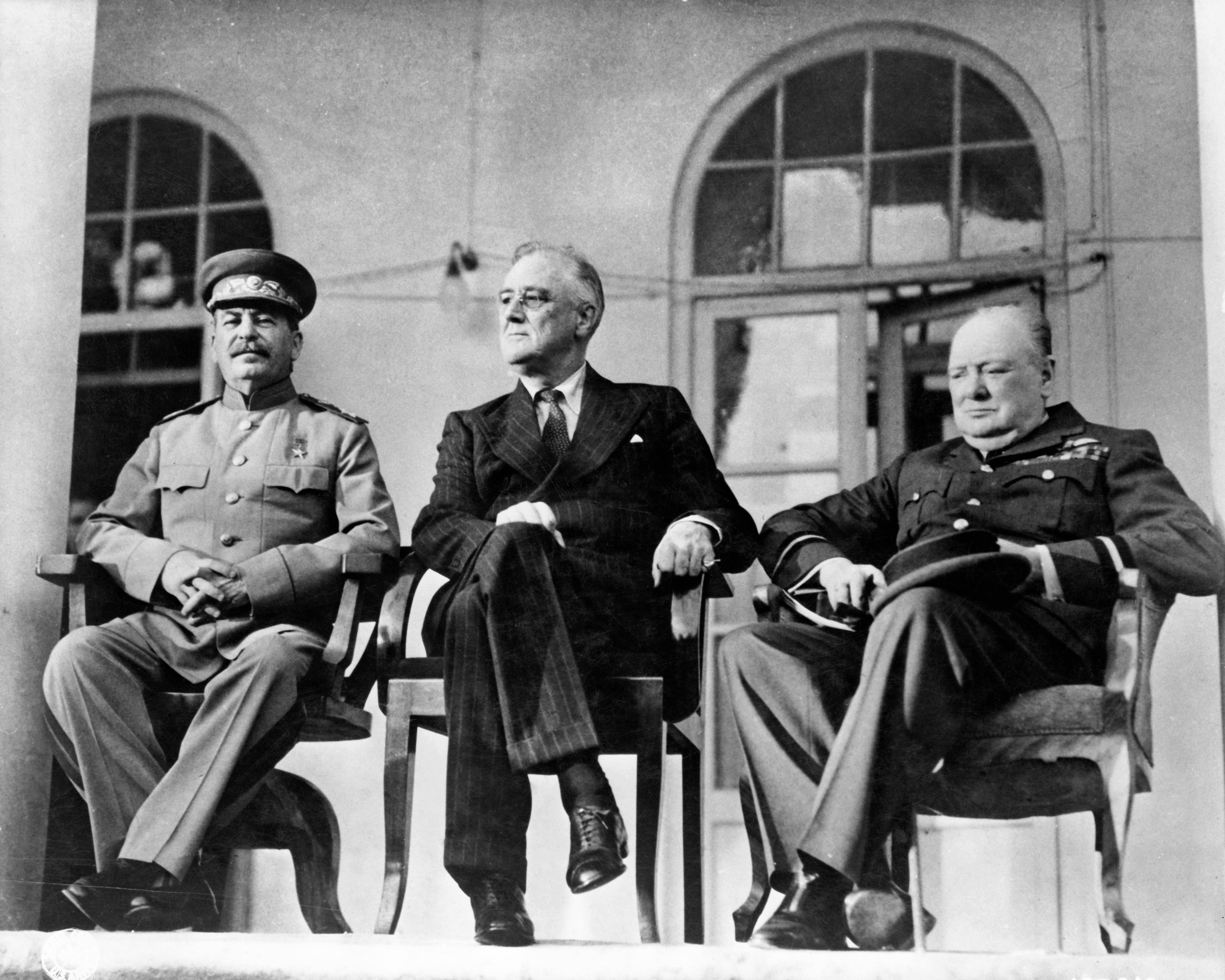
The "Big Three" (Stalin, Roosevelt and Churchill) at the Tehran Conference

The Tehran Conference (28 November to 1 December 1943) a strategy meeting of the Big Three leaders Joseph Stalin, Franklin D. Roosevelt and Winston Churchill held at the Soviet Union's embassy in Tehran had numerous objectives, and led to the commitment of the western Allies to open a second front in the war in the west.

== Campaigns ==
After the Fall of France, the battle to retake France began in Africa in November 1940. By September 1944, after the liberation of Paris and the southern France campaign and taking of Mediterranean ports in Marseille and Toulon, the country was largely liberated. The Allied Forces were driving into Germany from the west and the south. The liberation of France didn't finally end till the elimination of some pockets of German resistance along the Atlantic coast at the end of the war in May 1945.

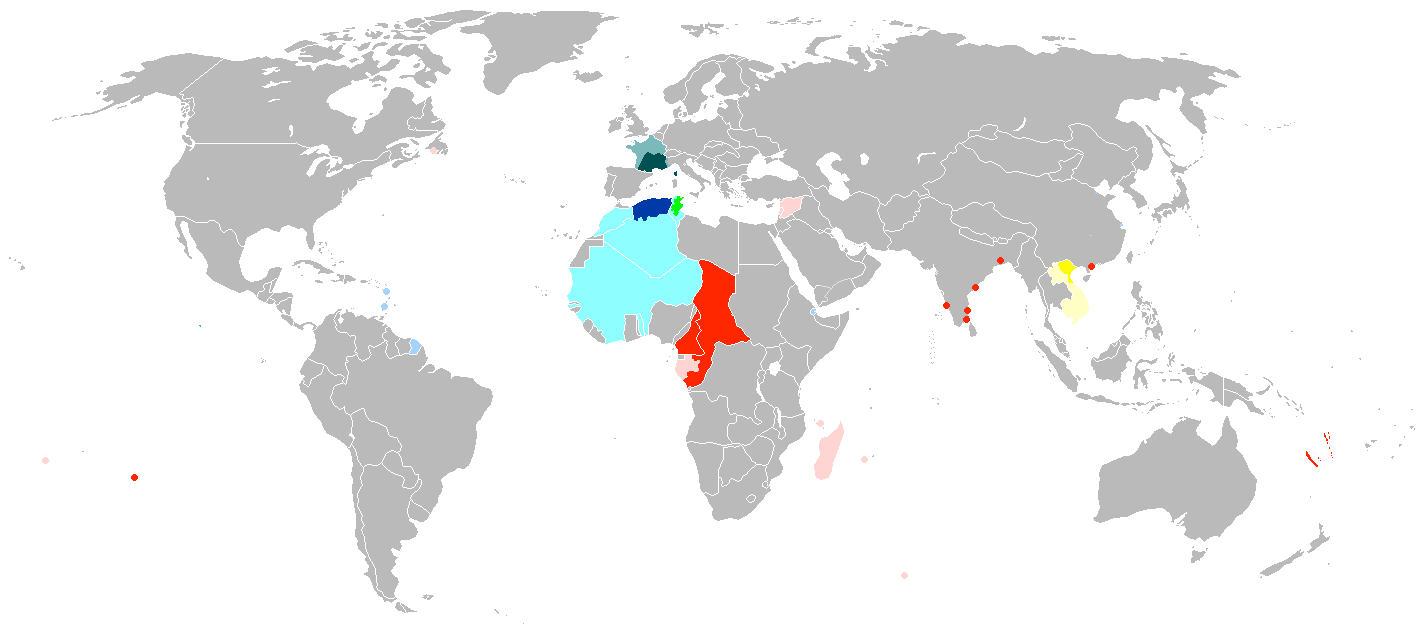
The gradual loss of all Vichy territory to Free France and the Allies by 1943.^{[legend]}

Militarily, the liberation of France was part of the Western Front of World War II. Other than scattered raids in 1942 and 1943, the reconquest began in earnest in the summer of 1944 in parallel campaigns in the north and south of France. On 6 June 1944, the Allies began Operation Overlord, the largest seaborne invasion in history, establishing a beachhead in Normandy, landing two million men in northern France and opening another front in western Europe against Germany. American forces broke out from Normandy at the end of July. At the Falaise Pocket the Allied armies destroyed German forces, opening the route to Paris. In the south, the Allies launched Operation Dragoon on 15 August, opening a new military front on the Mediterranean. In four weeks, the Germans retreated from southern France to Germany. This left French ports in Allied hands, resolving earlier supply problems in the south. Under the onslaught from both directions, the French Resistance organized a general uprising in Paris on 19 August. On 25 August 1944 Paris was liberated. The Allied forces began to push towards the Rhine. Initial rapid advances in the North stretched lines of supply in the autumn, and the advance slowed. German counteroffensives in the winter of 1944–45 such as the Battle of the Bulge slowed but did not stop the Allied armies, some crossing the Rhine in February, with heavy German losses. By late March several Allied armies had crossed and began advancing rapidly into Germany, with the end of the war not far away. With France mostly liberated, a few pockets of German resistance remained until the end of the war in May 1945.

=== Gabon – November 1940 ===
The Battle of Gabon resulted in the Free French Forces taking the colony of French Gabon and its capital, Libreville, from Vichy French forces. It was the only significant engagement in Central Africa during the war.

=== North Africa – November 1942 ===
==== Torch ====
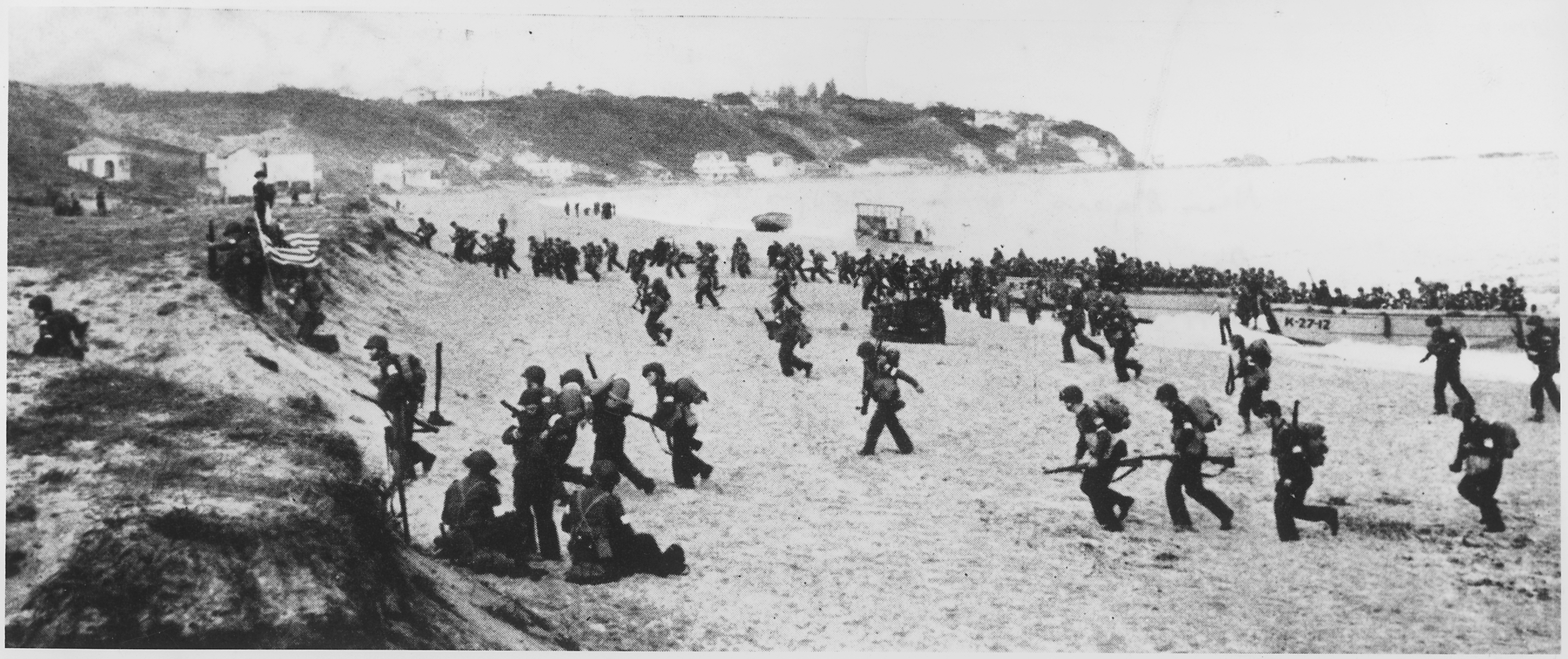
American soldiers land near Algiers. The soldier at the dune line is carrying a flag because it was hoped the French would be less likely to fire on Americans.

Operation Torch, the invasion of French North Africa, was carried out to trap Axis forces in North Africa between two Allied armies – an Anglo-American one in the west and a British and Commonwealth one in the east; this would also permit an invasion of Italy and free the Mediterranean for shipping. It would be the first ground combat operations for American troops in the west. In a three-pronged Allied assault against Vichy régime targets in French North Africa, the landing forces of Operation Torch came in at Casablanca, Oran and Algiers. Following Case Anton, French colonial governors had found themselves taking orders from the German military administration, and did so with varying degrees of enthusiasm. The American consul in Algiers believed that Vichy forces would welcome American soldiers.

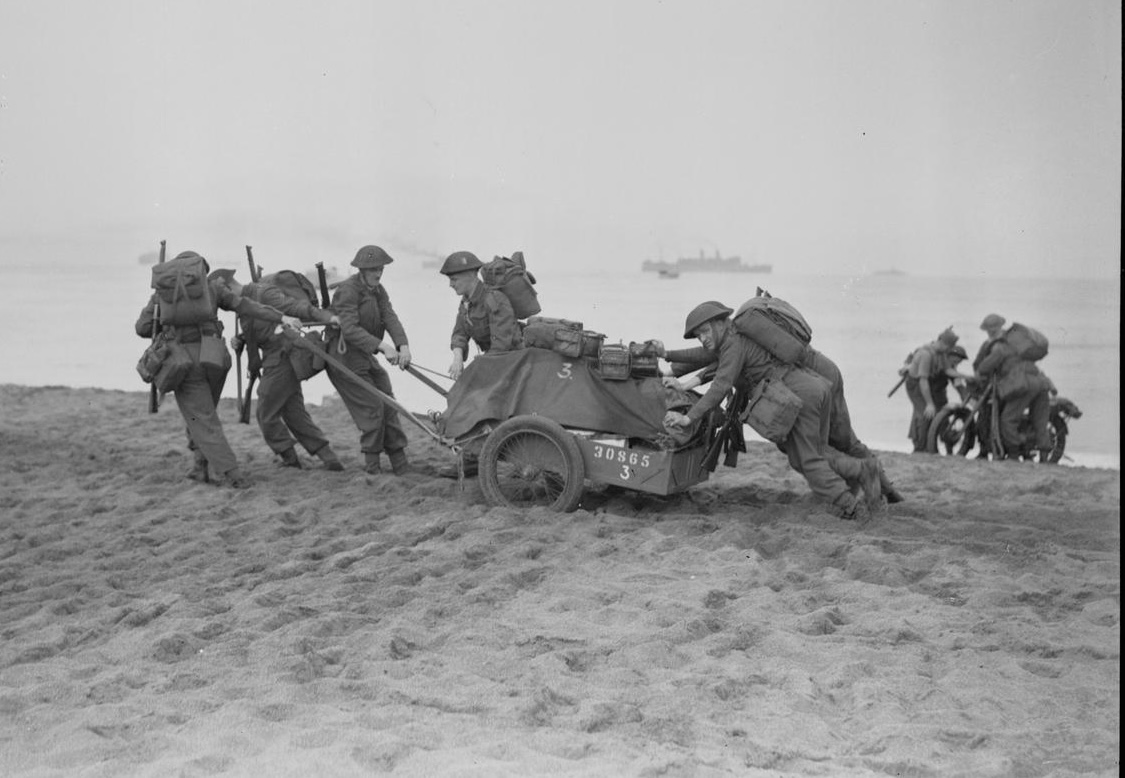
British troops after landing at Algiers in November 1942

A Western Task Force (aimed at Casablanca) was composed of American units, with Major General George S. Patton in command and Rear Admiral Henry Kent Hewitt heading naval operations. This Western Task Force consisted of the U.S. 3rd and 9th Infantry Divisions, and two battalions from the U.S. 2nd Armored Division — 35,000 troops in a convoy of over 100 ships. They were transported directly from the United States in the first of a new series of UG convoys providing logistical support for the North African campaign.

The Center Task Force, aimed at Oran, included the U.S. 2nd Battalion, 509th Parachute Infantry Regiment, the U.S. 1st Infantry Division and the U.S. 1st Armored Division—a total of 18,500 troops.

The Eastern Task Force—aimed at Algiers—was commanded by Lieutenant-General Kenneth Anderson and consisted of a brigade from the British 78th and the U.S. 34th Infantry Divisions, along with two British commando units (No. 1 and No. 6 Commandos), together with the RAF Regiment providing five squadrons of infantry and five Light anti-aircraft flights, totalling 20,000 troops. During the landing, ground forces were commanded by U.S. Major General Charles W. Ryder, of the 34th Division and naval forces were commanded by Royal Navy Vice-Admiral Sir Harold Burrough.

The plan to install Henri Giraud as governor of the freed territories did not get local support but the Vichy commander in chief of French armed forces François Darlan had been captured during the operation and was installed as High Commissioner, in return for which he ordered French forces in North Africa to cooperate with the Allies. Darlan was assassinated by an anti-Vichy monarchist and Giraud then took over. The Darlan deal triggered the invasion of Vichy France by Germany.

==== Tunisian campaign ====
French Tunisia had been a protectorate of France since 1881, when it became part of France's colonial empire.

After the Operation Torch landings in Morocco and Algiers the Allied forces moved eastwards into Tunisia as British forces moved west following the Second Battle of El Alamein. The Axis forces in North Africa were reinforced but subsequently cut off from resupply and caught between the two armies. The Allies took Bizerte and Tunis in May 1943 and the remaining Italian and German forces in North Africa surrendered. The Allies now had all of North Africa as a base of operations against southern Europe.

=== Corsica – 1943 ===
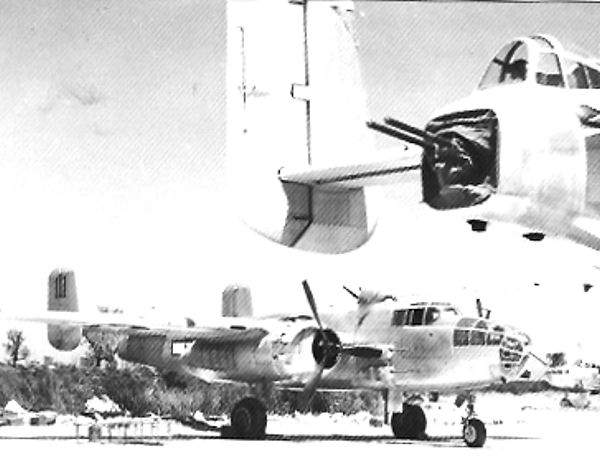
US B-25 bomber at Solenzara Air Base in Corsica in late 1944.

Except for a brief period, Corsica had been under the control of France since the Treaty of Versailles (1768). In World War II, Corsica was occupied by the Kingdom of Italy from November 1942, through September 1943. Italy initially occupied the island (as well as parts of France) as part of Nazi Germany's Case Anton on 11 November 1942. At its peak, Italy had 85,000 troops on the island. There was some native support among Corsican irredentists for the occupation. Benito Mussolini postponed the annexation of Corsica by Italy until after an assumed Axis victory in World War II, mainly because of German opposition to the irredentist claims.

Although there was mild support for the occupation among collaborationists and resistance was initially limited, it grew after the Italian invasion and by April 1943 became united, and was armed by airdrop and shipments by the Free French submarine Casabianca and establish some territorial control.

After Mussolini's imprisonment in July 1943, German troops took over the occupation of Corsica. The Allied invasion of Italy began 3 September 1943, leading to Italy's surrender to the Allies, with the main invasion force landing in Italy on 9 September. The local resistance signaled an uprising for the same day, beginning the liberation of Corsica (Operation Vesuvius).

The Allies did not initially want such a movement, preferring to focus their forces on the invasion of Italy. However, in light of the insurrection, the Allies acquiesced to Free French troops landing on Corsica, starting with an elite detachment of the reconstituted French I Corps landing (again by the submarine Casabianca) at Arone near the village of Piana in northwest Corsica. This prompted the German troops to attack Italian troops in Corsica as well as the Resistance. The Resistance, and the Italian 44 Infantry Division Cremona and 20 Infantry Division Friuli engaged in heavy combat with the German Sturmbrigade Reichsführer SS. The Sturmbrigade was joined by the 90th Panzergrenadier Division and the Italian XII Paratroopers Battalion/ 184th Paratroopers Regiment 184th Infantry Division "Nembo", which were retreating from Sardinia through Corsica, from Bonifacio to the northern port of Bastia. There were now 30,000 German troops in Corsica withdrawing via Bastia. On 13 September elements of the 4th Moroccan Mountain Division landed in Ajaccio to try to stop the Germans. During the night of 3 to 4 October, the last German units evacuated Bastia, leaving behind 700 dead and 350 POWs.

=== Battle of Normandy – June 1944 ===
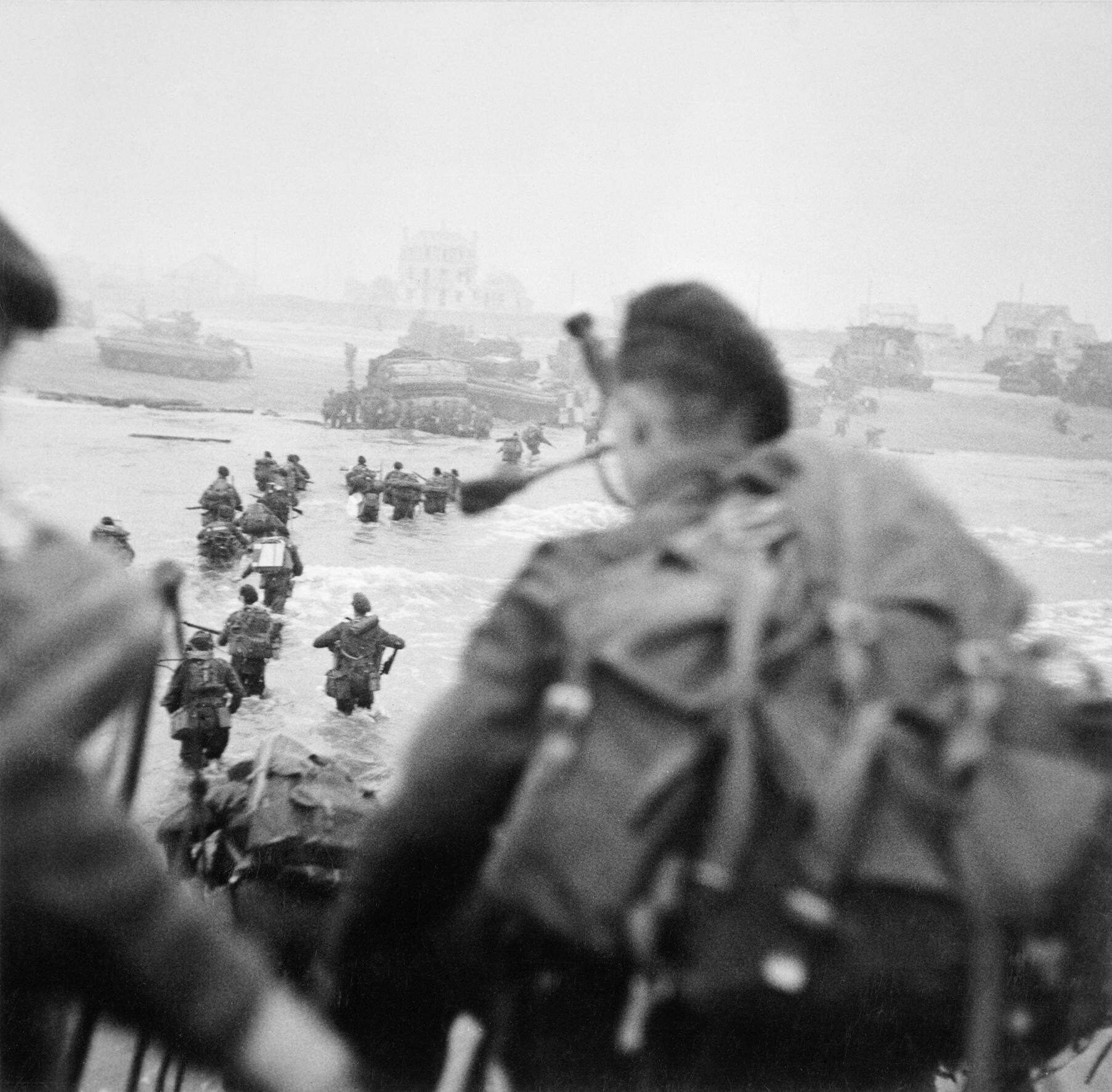
British troops wading ashore at La Breche, Normandy, France 6 June 1944

Operation Overlord was launched on 6 June 1944 with troops landing in Normandy. Attacks by 1,200 planes preceded an amphibious assault by more than 5,000 vessels. Nearly 160,000 troops crossed the English Channel on 6 June.

The Battle of Normandy was won due to what is still today the largest ever military landing logistical operation; it brought three million soldiers, mostly American, British, Canadian, and French, over the Channel from Britain.

Some of the German Army units they met in this operation were Ostlegionen, part of the German 243rd and 709th Static Infantry Divisions, near the Utah, Juno and Sword invasion beaches.

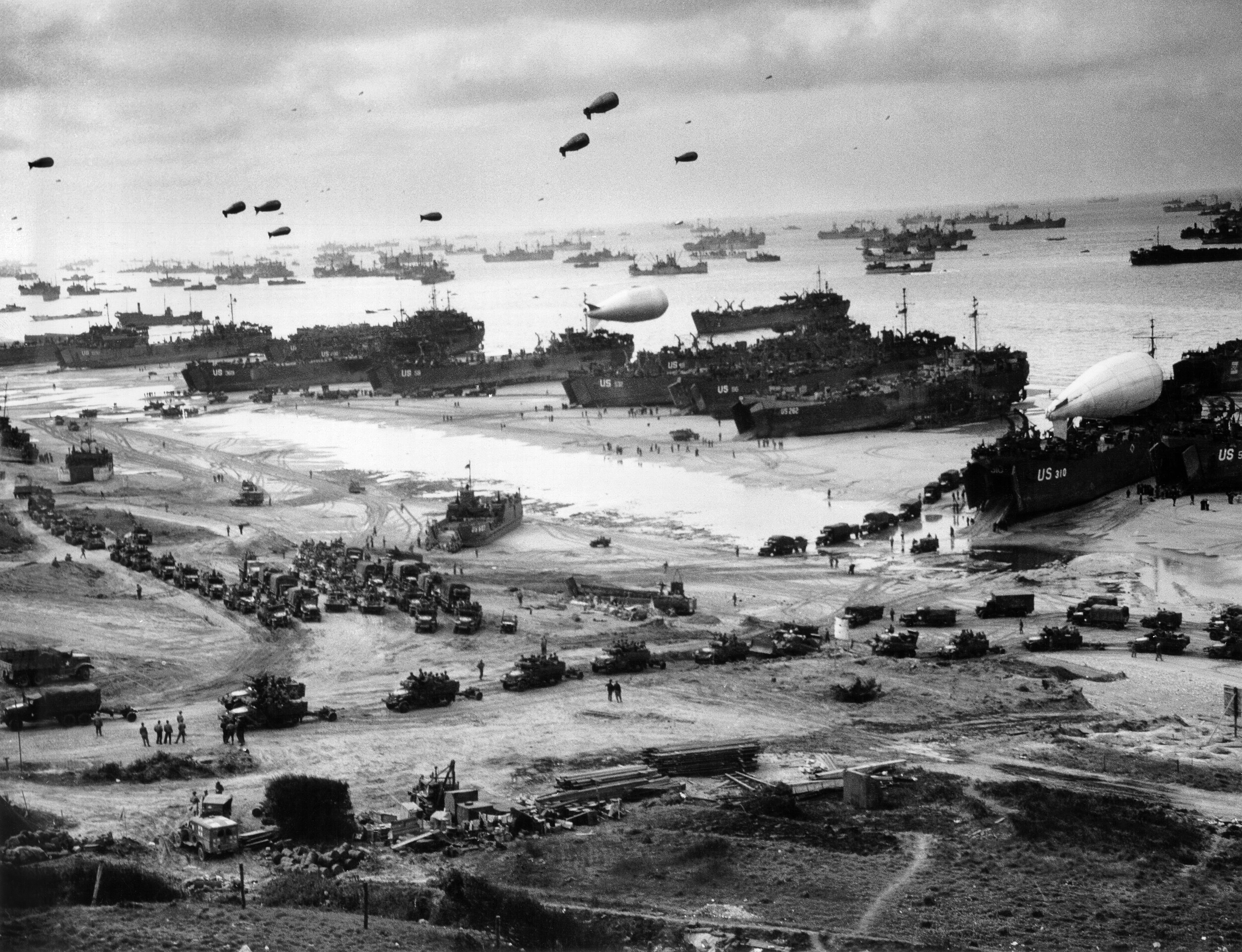
Vast amounts of men and equipment were landed on the Normandy beaches

The British intelligence organization, MI9, created Operation Marathon to gather downed airmen into isolated forest camps where they would await their rescue by allied military forces advancing after the Normandy Invasion of 6 June 1944. The Comet Line, a Belgian/French escape line, operated the forest camps with financial and logistical help from MI9, which also provided support for Operation Bonaparte, another escape and evasion line for downed airmen in Normandy.

=== Paris – August 1944 ===
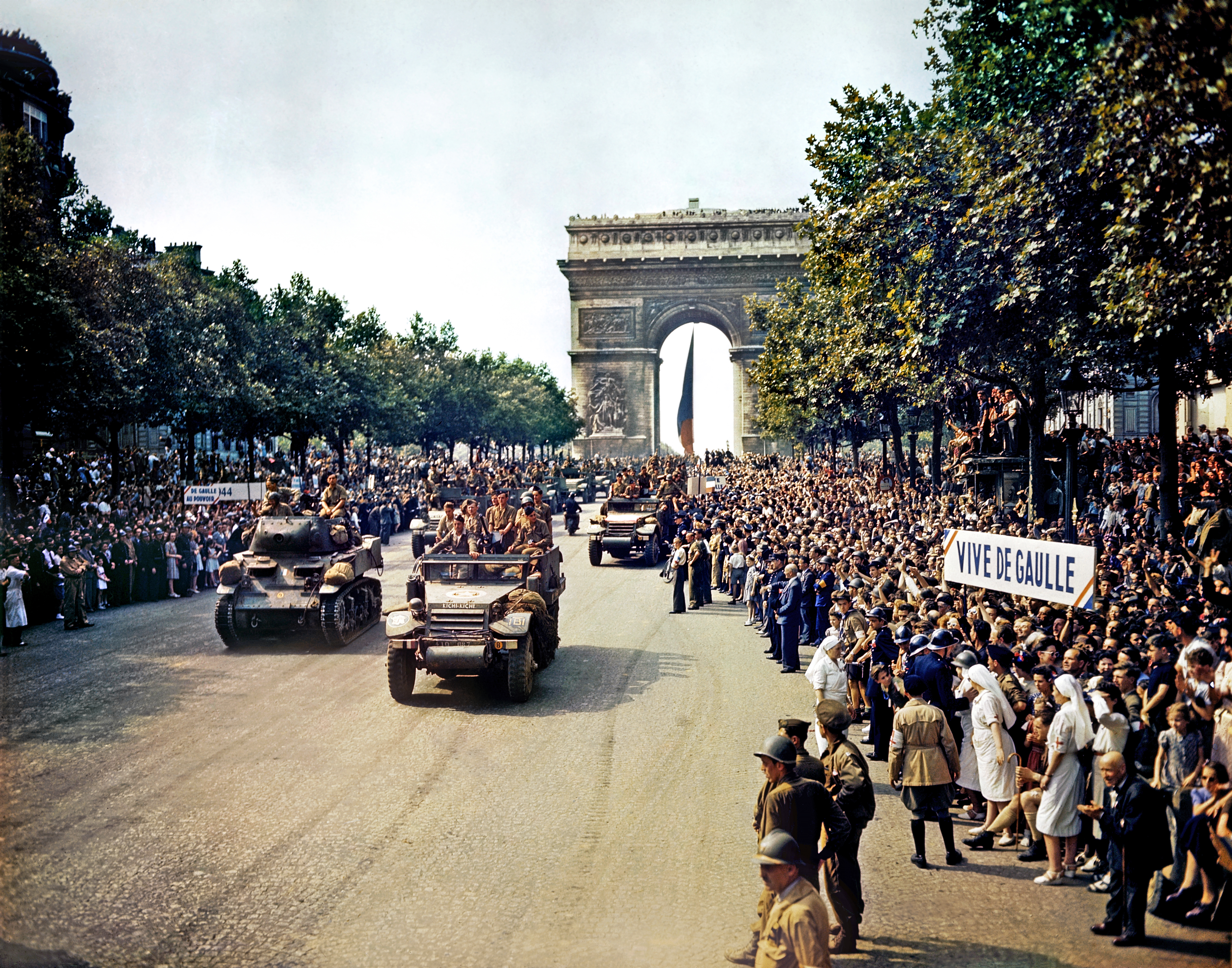
Parade on the Champs Elysees, 26 August 1944 after Liberation

The Liberation of Paris was an urban military battle that took place over the period of a week from 19 August 1944 until the German garrison surrendered the French capital on 25 August 1944. Paris had been ruled by Nazi Germany since the signing of the Armistice on 22 June 1940, after which the Wehrmacht occupied northern and western France.

As the final phase of Operation Overlord was still going on in August 1944, Eisenhower was not considering the liberation of Paris to be a primary objective. The goal of the U.S. and Anglo-Canadian armed forces was to destroy the German forces, and end World War II in Europe, to allow the Allies to concentrate their efforts on the Pacific war.

==== Uprising – 15 August ====
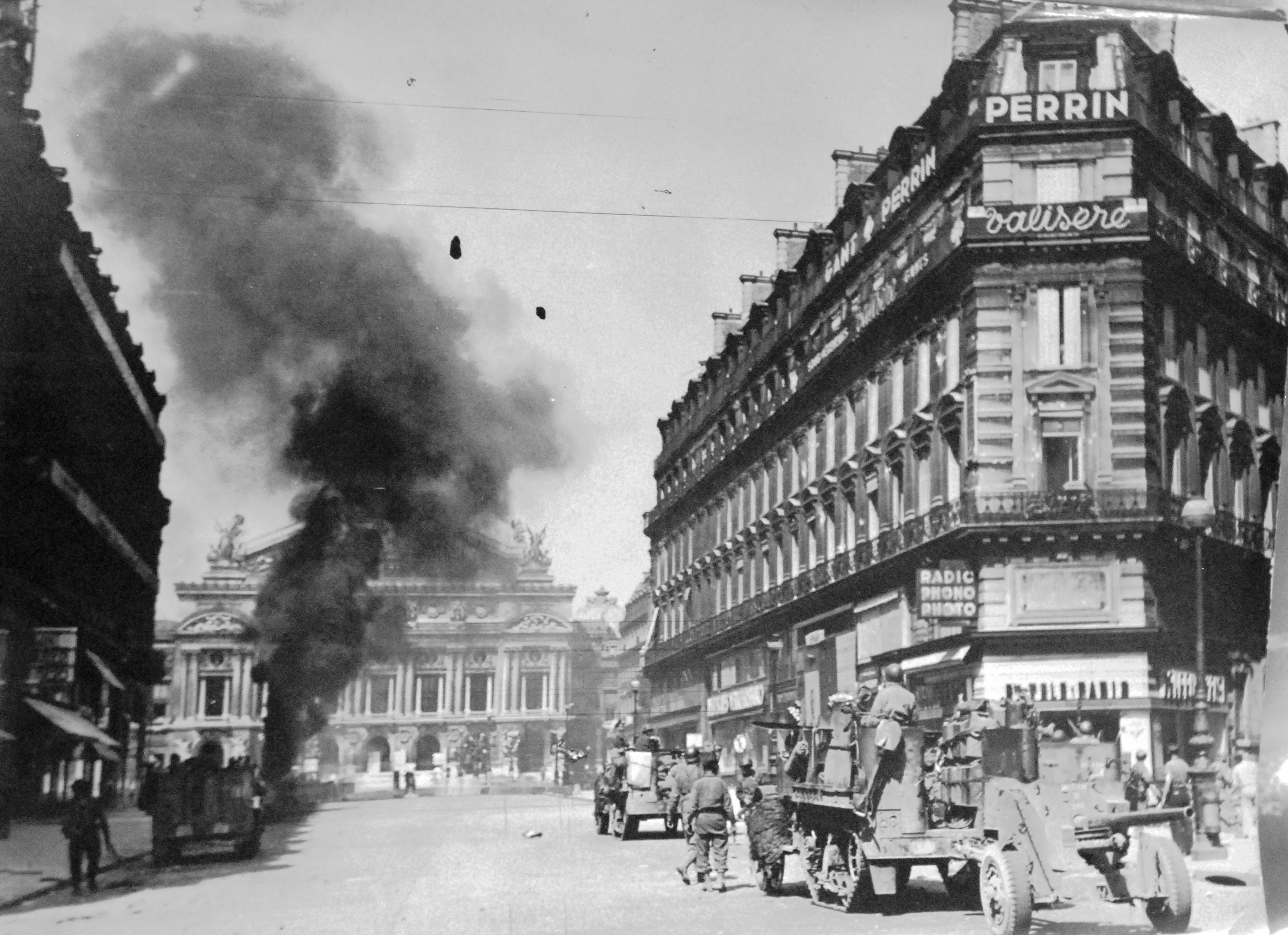
Armored vehicles of the 2nd Armored Division fighting at the Palais Garnier, a German tank in flames (Aug 25)

U.S. Army soldiers in front of the Palais de Chaillot after Liberation

As the French Resistance began to rise in Paris against the Germans on 15 August, Eisenhower stated that it was too early for an assault on Paris. He was also aware that Hitler had ordered the German military to completely destroy the city in the event of an Allied attack, and Paris was considered to have too great a value, culturally and historically, to risk its destruction.

On 15 August employees of the Paris Métro, the Gendarmerie, and National Police went on strike; postal workers followed the next day. They were soon joined by workers across the city, causing a general strike to break out on 18 August. Barricades began to appear on 20 August, with Resistance fighters organizing themselves to sustain a siege. Trucks were positioned, trees cut down, and trenches were dug in the pavement to free paving stones for consolidating the barricades.

Skirmishes reached their peak on 22 August, when some German units tried to leave their fortifications. At 09:00 on 23 August, under the orders of Dietrich von Choltitz, commander of the German garrison and military governor of Paris, the Germans opened fire on the Grand Palais, an FFI stronghold, and German tanks fired at the barricades in the streets. Adolf Hitler gave the order to inflict maximum damage on the city.

==== Allied arrival – 24–25 August ====
The liberation began when the FFI staged an uprising against the German garrison upon the approach of General Patton's US Third Army. On the night of 24 August, elements of General Philippe Leclerc's 2nd Armored Division made their way into Paris and arrived at the Hôtel de Ville shortly before midnight. The next morning, 25 August, the bulk of the 2nd Armored Division and the US 4th Infantry Division and other allied units entered the city. von Choltitz surrendered to the French at the Hôtel Meurice, the newly established French headquarters. de Gaulle arrived to assume control of the city.

It is estimated that between 800 and 1,000 Resistance fighters were killed during the Battle for Paris, and another 1,500 were wounded.

==== German surrender – 25 August ====
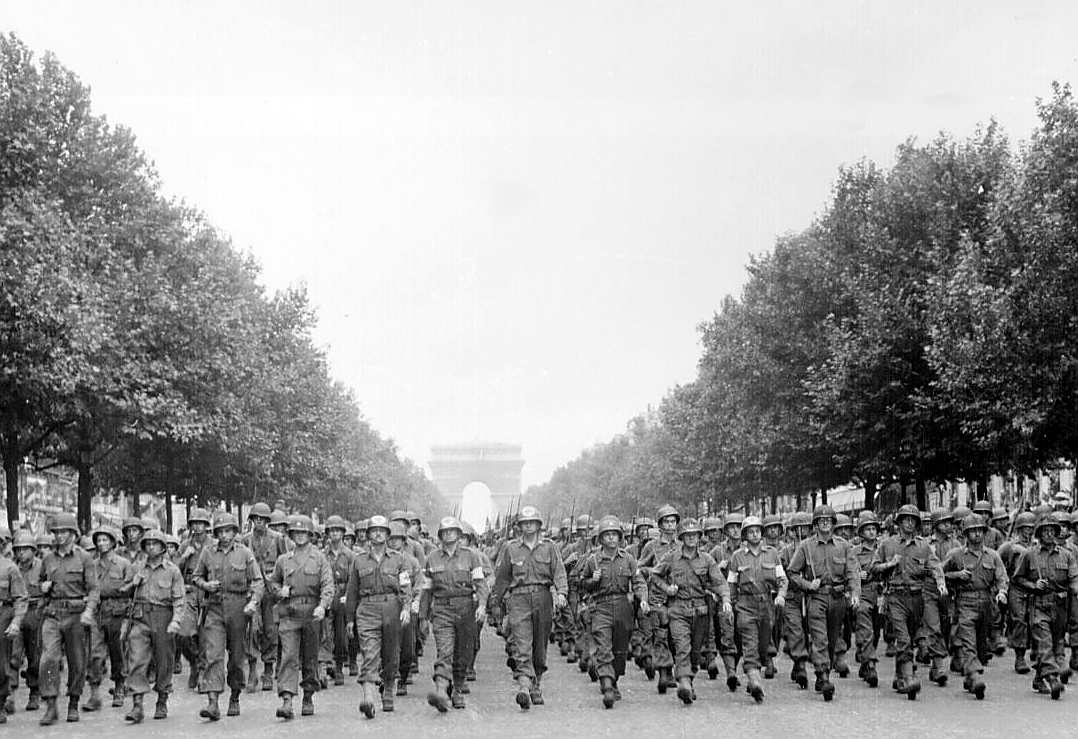
U.S. 28th Infantry Division in the "Victory Day" parade on 29 August

Despite repeated orders from Adolf Hitler that the French capital be destroyed before being given up, Choltitz surrendered on 25 August at the Hôtel Meurice. He then signed the official surrender at the Paris Police Prefecture. Choltitz later described himself in Is Paris Burning? (Brennt Paris?) as the saviour of Paris, for not blowing it up before surrendering.

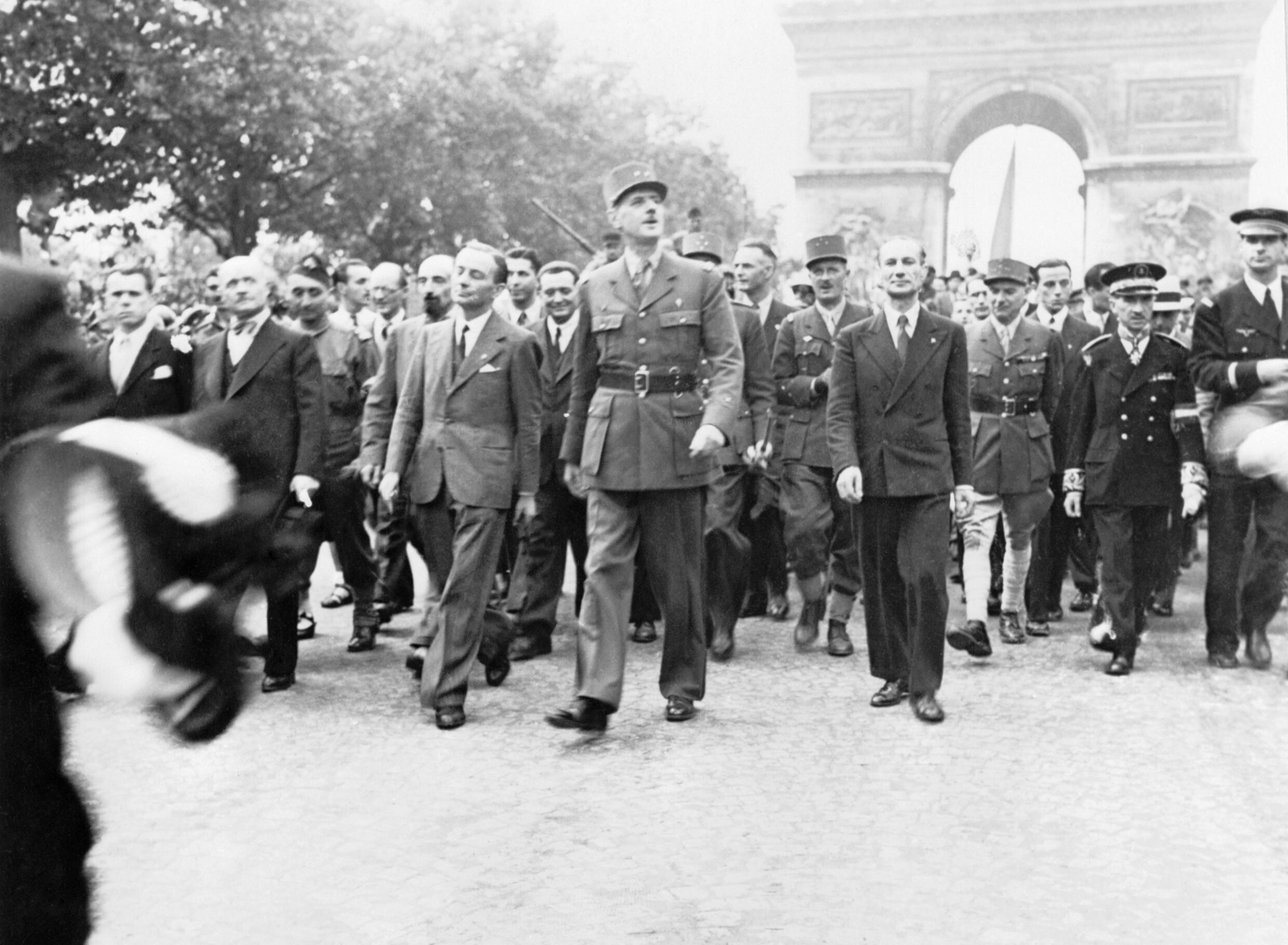
De Gaulle and his entourage stroll down the Champs Élysées on 26 August

The same day, Charles de Gaulle, President of the Provisional Government of the French Republic moved back into the War Ministry and made a rousing speech to the crowd from the Hôtel de Ville. The day after de Gaulle's speech, General Leclerc's 2nd Armored Division paraded down the Champs-Élysées, while de Gaulle marched down the boulevard and entered the Place de la Concorde. On 29 August, the U.S. Army's 28th Infantry Division paraded 24-abreast up the Avenue Hoche to the Arc de Triomphe, then down the Champs Élysées, greeted by joyous crowds.

The uprising in Paris gave the newly established Free French government and de Gaulle, enough prestige and authority to establish a provisional French Republic, replacing the fallen Vichy regime, which had fled into exile.

=== Southern France – August 1944 ===
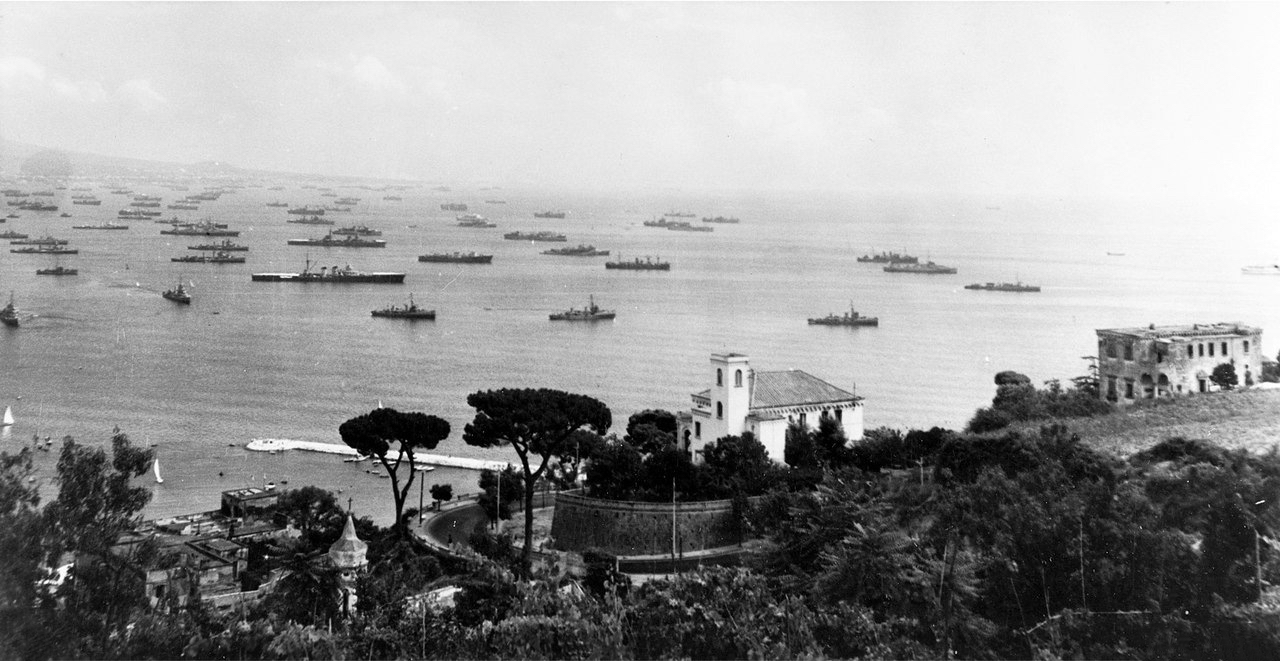
The Operation Dragoon invasion fleet on the French Riviera

==== Planning and goals ====
When first planned, the campaign in southern France and the landings in Normandy were to take place simultaneously—Operation Overlord in Normandy, and "Anvil" (as the southern campaign was originally called) in the south of France. A dual landing was soon recognized to be impossible; the southern campaign was postponed. The ports in Normandy had insufficient capacity to handle Allied military supply needs and French generals under de Gaulle pressed for a direct attack on southern France with the participation of French troops. Despite objections by Churchill, the operation was authorized by the Allied Combined Chiefs of Staff on 14 July and scheduled for 15 August.

The goal of the southern France campaign, now known as Operation Dragoon was to secure the vital ports on the French Mediterranean coast (of Marseille and Toulon.) and pressure German forces with another front. The US VI Corps landed on the beaches of the French Riviera (Côte d'Azur) on 15 August 1944 shielded by a large naval task force, followed by several divisions of French Army B (commanded by Jean de Lattre de Tassigny.).

They were opposed by the scattered forces of the German Army Group G, (Heeresgruppe G) which had been weakened by the relocation of its divisions to other fronts and the replacement of its soldiers with third-rate men outfitted with obsolete equipment. The Army was understrength, most of the units having been sent north earlier. The units that were present were spread thinly, made up of second rate units from eastern Europe (Ostlegionen) with low morale and poor equipment. The coastal defenses had been improved by the Vichy regime and later improved by the Germans after they took over in November 1942.

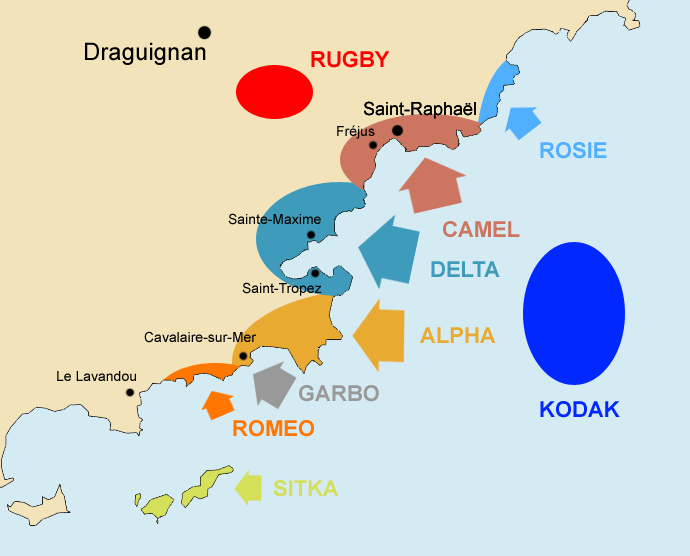
Allied invasion of southern France in Operation Dragoon

The FFI played a major role in the fighting. The Allied ground and naval forces were supported by a fleet of 3470 planes, mostly stationed on Corsica and Sardinia.

On 14 August, preliminary landings took place in the Hyères Islands by the First Special Service Force, a joint U.S.-Canadian special-forces unit, to secure a staging area and for amphibious landing training. After sporadic resistance, driving the German garrison to the western part of the island, the Germans surrendered on 17 August. The Force transferred to the mainland, becoming part of the First Airborne Task Force. Meanwhile, French commandos were active to the west in Operation Romeo and Operation Span.

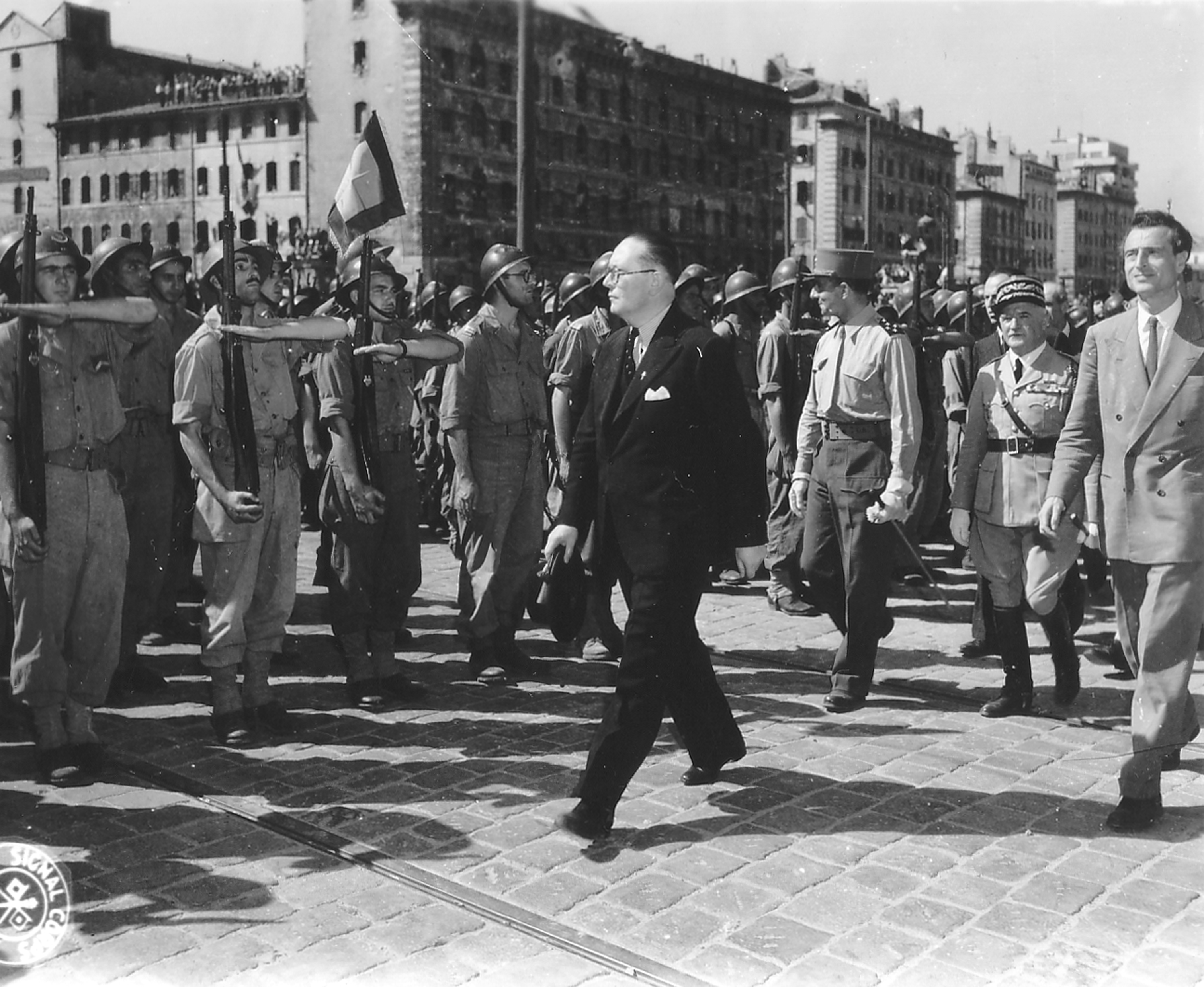
Jean de Lattre de Tassigny walking through the liberated city of Marseille

Hindered by Allied air supremacy and a large-scale uprising by the FFI, the weak German forces were swiftly defeated. The Germans withdrew to the north through the Rhône valley, to establish a stable defense line at Dijon. Allied mobile units were able to overtake the Germans and partially block their route at the town of Montélimar. The ensuing battle led to a stalemate, with neither side able to achieve a decisive breakthrough, until the Germans were finally able to complete their withdrawal and retreat from the town. While the Germans were retreating, the French managed to capture the important ports of Marseille and Toulon, putting them into operation soon after.

The Germans were not able to hold Dijon and ordered a complete withdrawal from Southern France. Army Group G retreated further north, pursued by Allied forces. The fighting ultimately came to a stop at the Vosges mountains, where Army Group G was finally able to establish a stable defense line. After meeting with the Allied units from Operation Overlord, the Allied forces were in need of reorganizing and, facing stiffened German resistance, the offensive was halted on 14 September. Operation Dragoon was considered a success by the Allies. It enabled them to liberate most of Southern France in just four weeks while inflicting heavy casualties on the German forces, although a substantial part of the best German units were able to escape. The captured French ports were put into operation, allowing the Allies to solve their supply problems soon after.

=== Eastern France – Autumn 1944 ===
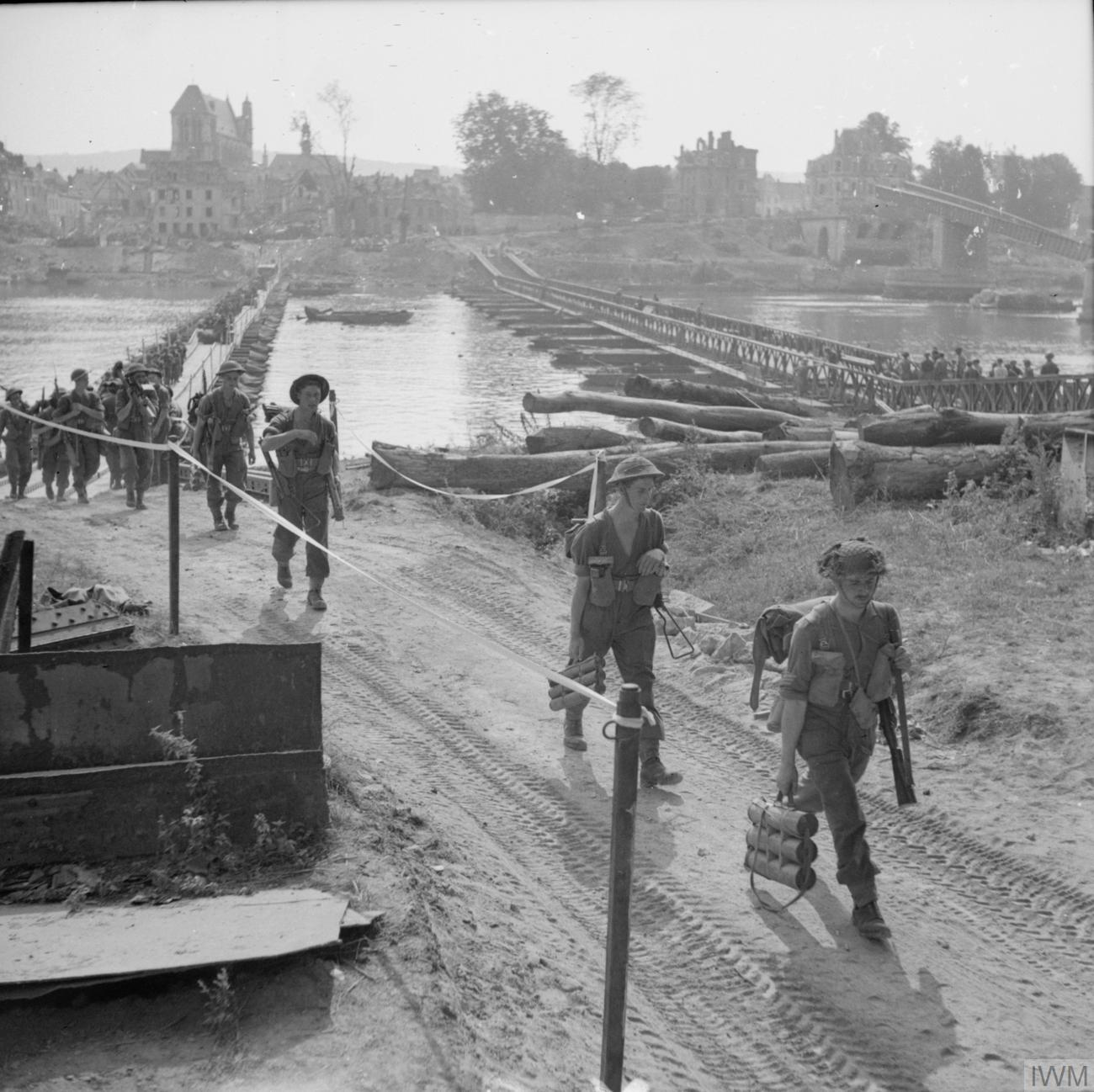
British infantry of the 1st Battalion, Hampshire Regiment crossing the Seine at Vernon, 28 August 1944.

The First Canadian Army liberated the French coast from Normandy to the Low Countries. Hitler had ordered the troops occupying them to hold them at all costs but using isolation and coordinated bombardment, the ports were reduced.

Fighting on the Western front seemed to stabilize, and the Allied advance stalled in front of the Siegfried Line (Westwall) and the southern reaches of the Rhine. Starting in early September, the Americans began slow and bloody fighting through the Hurtgen Forest (described by Ernest Hemingway as "Passchendaele with tree bursts"—) to breach the Line.

American forces fought from September until mid-December to push the Germans out of Lorraine and from behind the Siegfried Line. The crossing of the Moselle River and the capture of the fortress of Metz proved difficult for the American troops in the face of German reinforcements, supply shortages, and unfavorable weather. During September and October, the Allied 6th Army Group (U.S. Seventh Army and French First Army) fought a difficult campaign through the Vosges Mountains that was marked by dogged German resistance and slow advances. In November, however, the German front snapped under the pressure, resulting in sudden Allied advances that liberated Belfort, Mulhouse, and Strasbourg, and placed Allied forces along the Rhine River. The Germans managed to hold a large bridgehead (the Colmar Pocket), on the western bank of the Rhine and centered around the city of Colmar. On 16 November the Allies started a large scale autumn offensive called Operation Queen. With its main thrust again through the Hürtgen Forest, the offensive drove the Allies to the Rur River, but failed in its core objectives to capture the Rur dams and pave the way towards the Rhine. The Allied operations were then succeeded by the German Ardennes offensive.

=== Pockets of German resistance – to May 1945 ===
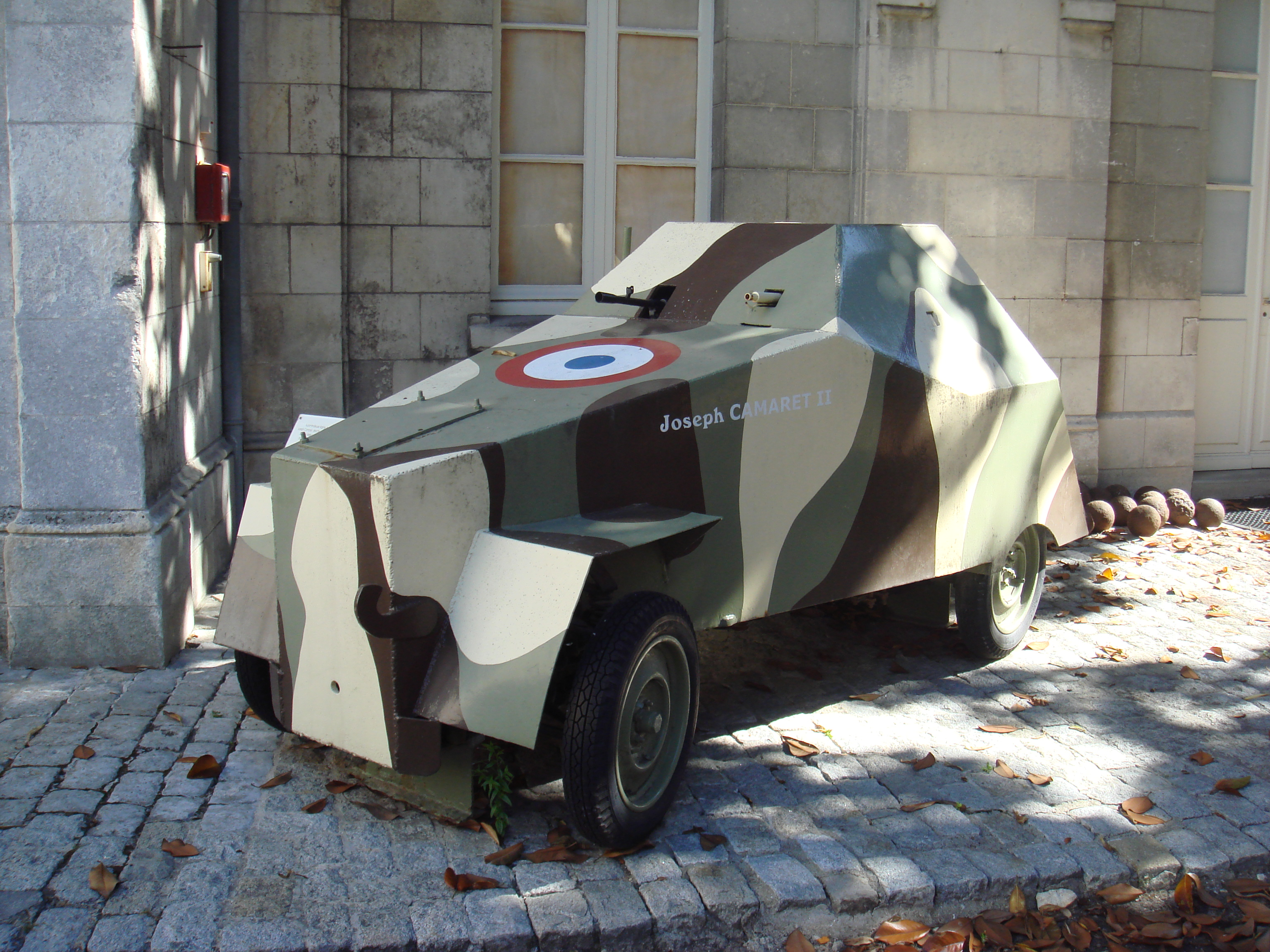
French Army armoured car which participated in the liberation of La Rochelle in 1945. Musée d'Orbigny-Bernon in La Rochelle, France

The pocket of La Rochelle was a zone of German resistance at the end of the Second World War. It was made up of the city of La Rochelle, the submarine base at La Pallice, of the Île de Ré and of most of the Ile d'Oléron (the southern part of the island was part of the Royan pocket).

== Victory – 7 May 1945 ==
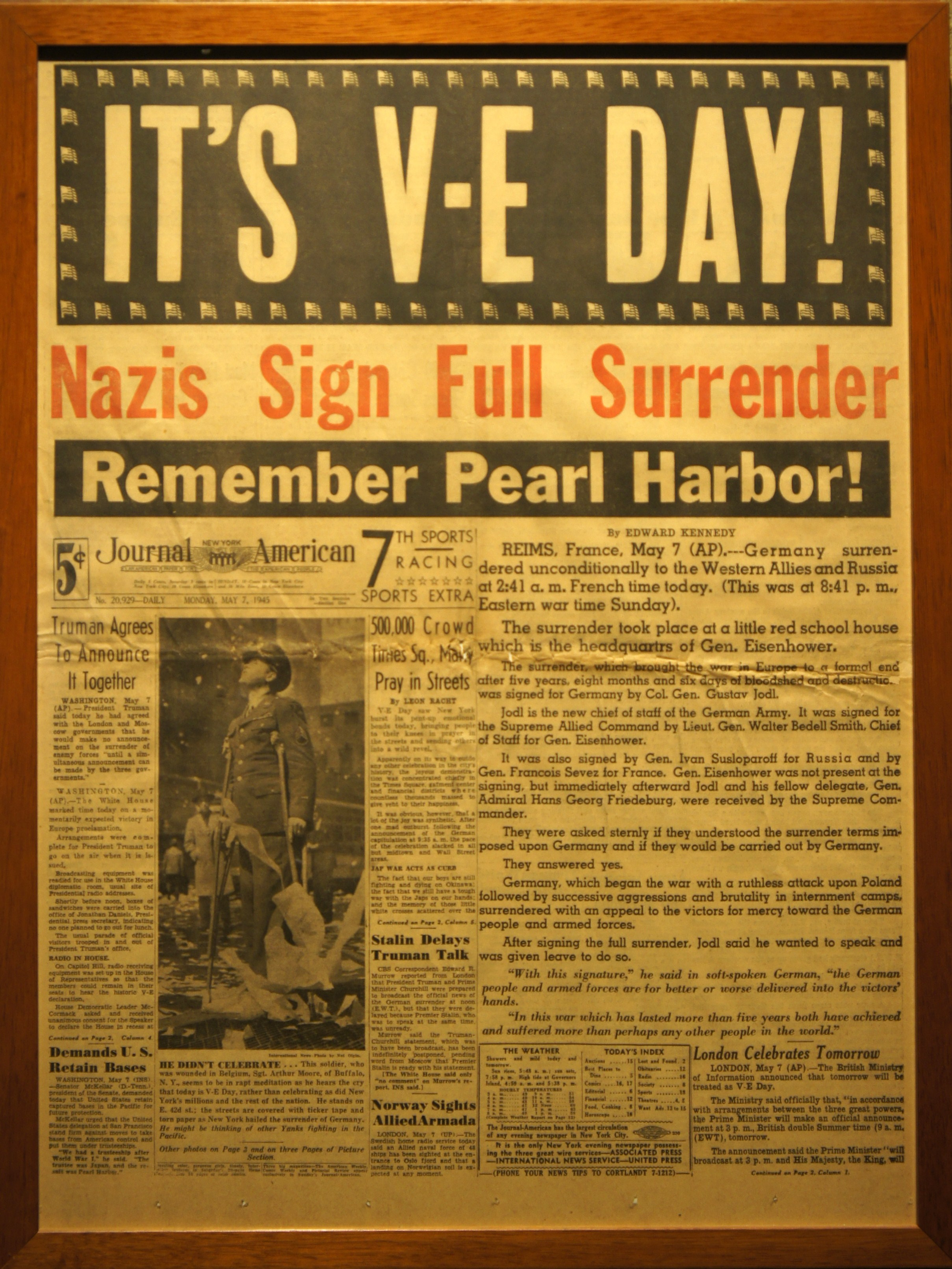
Journal American of 7 May 1945 announcing Victory in Europe (Musée de la Reddition)

Victory in Europe was achieved on 7 May 1945. Hitler committed suicide on 30 April during the Battle of Berlin and Germany's surrender was authorised by his successor, Reichspräsident Karl Dönitz leader of the rump administration Flensburg Government. The act of military surrender was first signed at 02:41 on 7 May in SHAEF HQ at Reims, and a slightly modified document, considered the definitive German Instrument of Surrender, was signed on 8 May 1945 in Karlshorst, Berlin at 21:20 local time.

The German High Command will at once issue orders to all German military, naval and air authorities and to all forces under German control to cease active operations at 23.01 hours Central European time on 8 May 1945...

— German Instrument of Surrender, Article 2

== Aftermath ==
By the autumn of 1944, Paris and the northern part of France were in Allied hands following Normandy campaign, and the southern part of France was free in the wake of the success of Operation Dragoon. Except for a few Atlantic pockets, the Allies were in full control of France, freeing their military forces to push eastward across the Rhine into Germany and towards Berlin.

Meanwhile, liberation of most of metropolitan France unleashed several other overlapping events. The Provisional Government, already in existence since June 1944, moved back to the capital after Paris was liberated in late August, where it piloted an orderly transition back to republican government. The Vichy regime held its last meeting on 17 August 1944, before fleeing into exile in Sigmaringen, Germany.

Within France, a wave of assaults, extra-judicial executions, and public humiliations followed of suspected collaborators, particularly of women who had consorted with German men. This was known as the épuration sauvage ("wild purge"). At least 20,000 French women had their heads shorn. Many women in Normandy reported rapes by American soldiers, several of whom were subsequently executed.

A series of legal purges followed, ordered by courts set up for the purpose. The first free municipal elections since before the war were organized by the Provisional Government in May 1945, and women voted for the first time. The new Constitution of the Fourth French Republic was accepted in October 1946.

=== End of Vichy ===
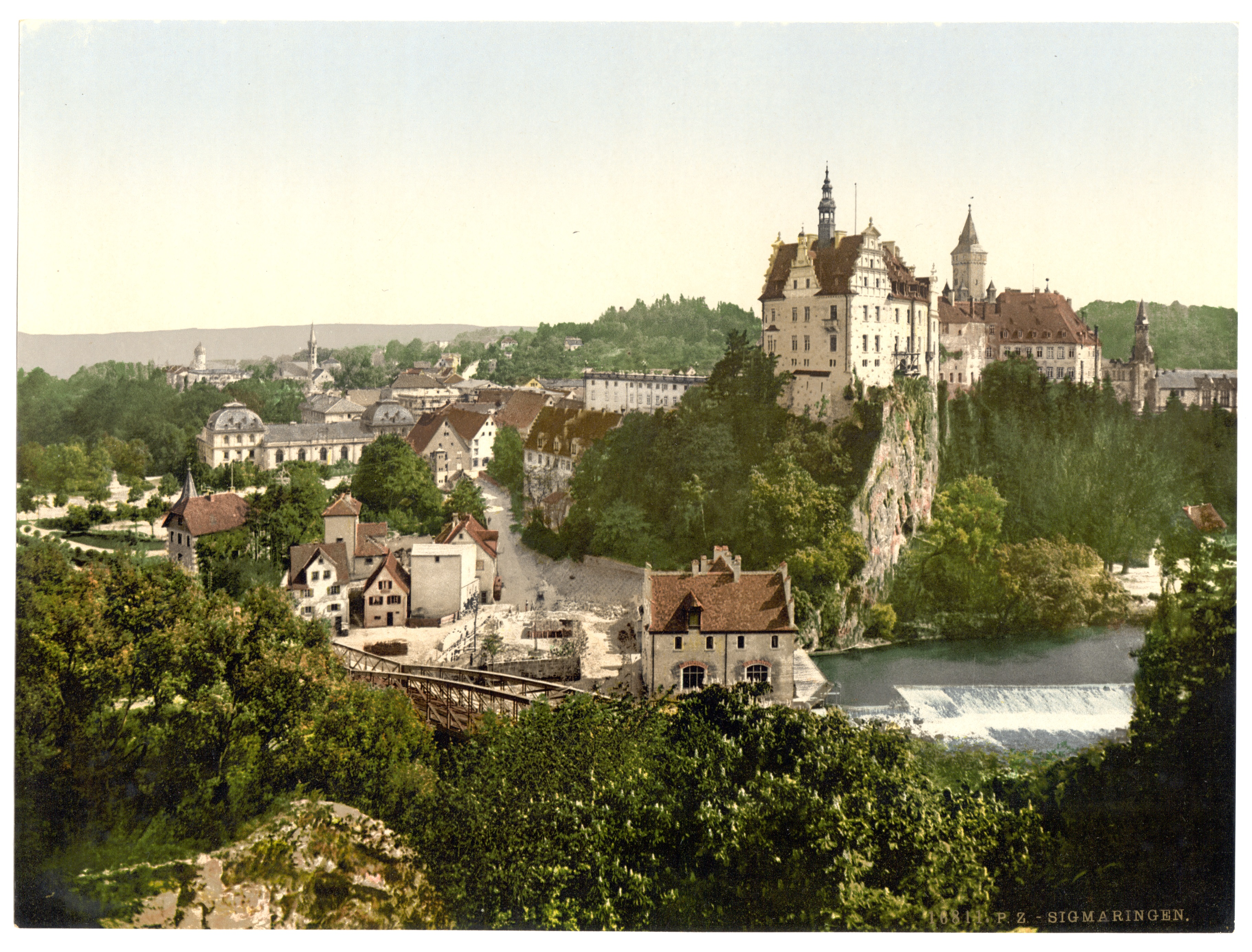
The Vichy government moved to the castle in Sigmaringen, Germany

Under pressure from the advancing Allied forces, Pierre Laval held the last government council on 17 August 1944, with five ministers. With permission from the Germans, he attempted to call back the prior National Assembly with the goal of giving it power and thus impeding the communists and de Gaulle. He obtained the agreement of German ambassador Otto Abetz to bring Édouard Herriot, (President of the Chamber of Deputies) back to Paris. But ultra-collaborationists Marcel Déat and Fernand de Brinon protested to the Germans, who changed their minds and took Laval to Belfort on 20 August 1944 along with the remains of his government, "to assure its legitimate security", along with Petain, and arrested Herriot.

A governmental commission directed by Fernand de Brinon was proclaimed on 6 September. On 7 September, they were taken ahead of the advancing Allied Forces out of France to the town of Sigmaringen, where other Vichy officials were already present, arriving on the 8th.

Sigmaringen Castle was occupied and used by the Vichy government-in-exile from September 1944 to April 1945. Pétain resided at the Castle, but refused to cooperate and kept mostly to himself, and ex-Prime Minister Laval also refused. Despite the efforts of the collaborationists and the Germans, Pétain never recognized the Sigmaringen Commission. The Germans, wanting to present a facade of legality, enlisted other Vichy officials such as Fernand de Brinon as president, along with Joseph Darnand, Jean Luchaire, Eugène Bridoux and Marcel Déat.

On 7 September 1944, fleeing the advance of Allied troops into France, a thousand French collaborators (including a hundred officials of the Vichy regime, a few hundred members of the French Militia, collaborationist party militants, and the editorial staff of the newspaper Je suis partout) but also waiting-game opportunists (Note: "waiting-game opportunists": Attentistes in the original.) also went into exile in Sigmaringen.

The commission had its own radio station (Radio-patrie, Ici la France) and an official press (La France, Le Petit Parisien), and hosted the embassies of the Axis powers: Germany, Italy and Japan. The population of the enclave was about 6,000, including known collaborationist journalists, the writers Louis-Ferdinand Céline and Lucien Rebatet, the actor Robert Le Vigan and their families, as well as 500 soldiers, 700 French SS, prisoners of war and STO workers. Inadequate housing, insufficient food, promiscuity among the paramilitaries, and lack of hygiene facilitated the spread of numerous illnesses including flu and tuberculosis, and a high mortality rate among children. The only two French doctors, Doctor Destouches, alias (Louis-Ferdinand Céline) and Bernard Ménétrel. treated these ailments as best they could.

On 21 April 1945 General de Lattre ordered his forces to take Sigmaringen. The end came within days. By the 26th, Pétain was in the hands of French authorities in Switzerland, and Laval had fled to Spain. Brinon, Luchaire, and Darnand were captured, tried, and executed by 1947. Other members escaped to Italy or Spain.

=== Justice and retribution ===
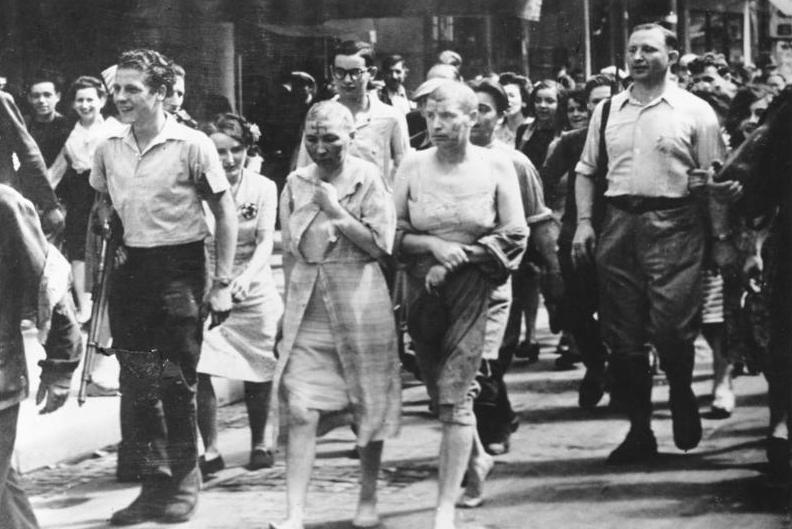
French women accused of collaboration with the enemy during the occupation are led through the streets of Paris barefoot, faces burnt, and with their heads shaved.

==== Extrajudicial purges ====
Immediately following the liberation, France was swept by a wave of executions, public humiliations, assaults and detentions of suspected collaborators, known as the épuration sauvage (wild purge). This period succeeded the German occupational administration but preceded the authority of the French Provisional Government and consequently lacked any form of institutional justice. Approximately 9,000 were executed, mostly without trial in summary executions, notably including members and leaders of the pro-Nazi milices. In one case, as many as 77 milice members were summarily executed at once. An inquest into the issue of summary executions launched by Jules Moch, then Minister of the Interior, came to the conclusion that there had been 9,673 summary executions. A second inquiry in 1952 separated out 8,867 executions of suspected collaborators and 1,955 summary executions for which the motive of killing was not known, giving a total of 10,822 executions. Shaving the heads of women as a form of humiliation and shaming was a common feature of the purges, and between 10,000 and 30,000 women accused of having collaborated with the Germans or having had relationships with German soldiers or officers were subjected to the practice, becoming known as tonsured women (femmes tondues).

==== Legal purge ====
The official épuration légale ("legal purge") began following a June 1944 decree that established a three-tier system of judicial courts: a High Court of Justice which dealt with Vichy ministers and officials; Courts of Justice for other serious cases of alleged collaboration; and regular Civic Courts for lesser cases of alleged collaboration. Over 700 collaborators were executed following legal trials. The initial phase of purge trials ended with a series of amnesty laws passed between 1951 and 1953 which reduced the number of imprisoned collaborators from 40,000 to 62, and was followed by a period of official "repression" that lasted between 1954 and 1971.

Reliable statistics of the death toll do not exist. At the low end, one estimate is that approximately 10,500 were executed, before and after liberation. "The courts of Justice pronounced about 6,760 death sentences, 3,910 in absentia and 2,853 in the presence of the accused. Of these 2,853, 73 percent were commuted by de Gaulle, and 767 carried out. In addition, about 770 executions were ordered by the military tribunals. Thus the total number of people executed before and after the Liberation was approximately 10,500, including those killed in the épuration sauvage", notably including members and leaders of the milices. US forces put the number of summary executions following liberation at 80,000. The French Minister of the Interior in March 1945 claimed that the number executed was 105,000.

=== Elections of May 1945 ===
The French municipal elections of 1945 were held in two rounds on 29 April and 13 May 1945. These were the first elections since the liberation of France and the first in which women could vote. (Note: The right to vote was granted to women in the Ordinance of 21 April 1944.) Elections did not take place in four departments (Bas-Rhin, Haut-Rhin, Moselle and Territory of Belfort) with recent fighting that had prevented the creation of electoral lists. In Moselle, they were postponed to 23 and 30 September, at the same time as the cantonal elections, because the end of the fighting was too close. These difficulties made it very difficult to compile electoral lists that included women, and there were very few by-elections before these historic dates.

==== Election context ====
While the war was not yet officially over (the German surrender of 8 May 1945 was signed between the two rounds of voting), the elections took place in a difficult political and social context: the economic situation remained very precarious, not all prisoners of war had returned, and many scores were being settled in local political life.

These elections were the first test for the validity of the provisional institutions that had emerged from the Resistance.

The electoral system in force was the two-round majority system, except in Paris, where elections were held under the proportional system. This election was also marked by the participation of women for the first time in France. On 21 April 1944, the right to vote had been granted to women by the French Committee of National Liberation, and confirmed by the ordinance of 5 October under the Provisional Government of the French Republic. Given the absence of 2 1/2 million prisoners of war, deportees, STO workers, and the ban on voting by career soldiers, the electorate in this election was composed of up to 62% women (although the figure of 53% is also cited). Despite the novelty of women voters, there was no particular media reaction, partly because of the difficulties related to the immediate post-war period which were of greater concern, such as returned deportees, prisoner camps, food rationing, and so on.

The referendum proposed to the French by the Provisional Government (GPRF) contained two questions. The first one proposed the drafting of a new Constitution and, consequently, the abandonment of the institutions of the Third Republic. Charles de Gaulle advocated for its support, as did all political parties, excepting the radicals, who remained faithful to the Third Republic. On 21 October 1945, 96 per cent of the French voted "yes" on the first question of the referendum in favor of changing the institutions: the Assembly elected that day would thus be constituent.

The second referendum question concerned the powers of this Constituent Assembly. Fearing a preponderance of communists in control over it, which would allow them to legally install a power of their own choice, General de Gaulle provided a text strictly limiting its prerogatives: its duration was limited to seven months, the constitutional plans it would draft would be submitted to popular referendum, and finally it could only bring down the government by a motion of censure voted by an absolute majority of its members. Most parties supported de Gaulle in advocating a "yes" vote, including the Popular Republican Movement (MRP), the socialists and the moderates, while the communists and radicals pushed for "no". Nevertheless, 66 per cent of the electorate approved of limiting the powers of the Assembly by voting "yes" in the referendum.

=== Provisional Government of the French Republic ===
Emblem of the Provisional Government of the French Republic (1944)

The Provisional Government of the French Republic was the successor organization to the French Committee of National Liberation. It served as an interim government of Free France between 1944 and 1946, and lasted until the establishment of the Fourth Republic. Its founding marked the official restoration and re-establishment of a provisional French Republic, assuring continuity with the defunct Third Republic which dissolved itself in 1940 with the advent of the Vichy regime.

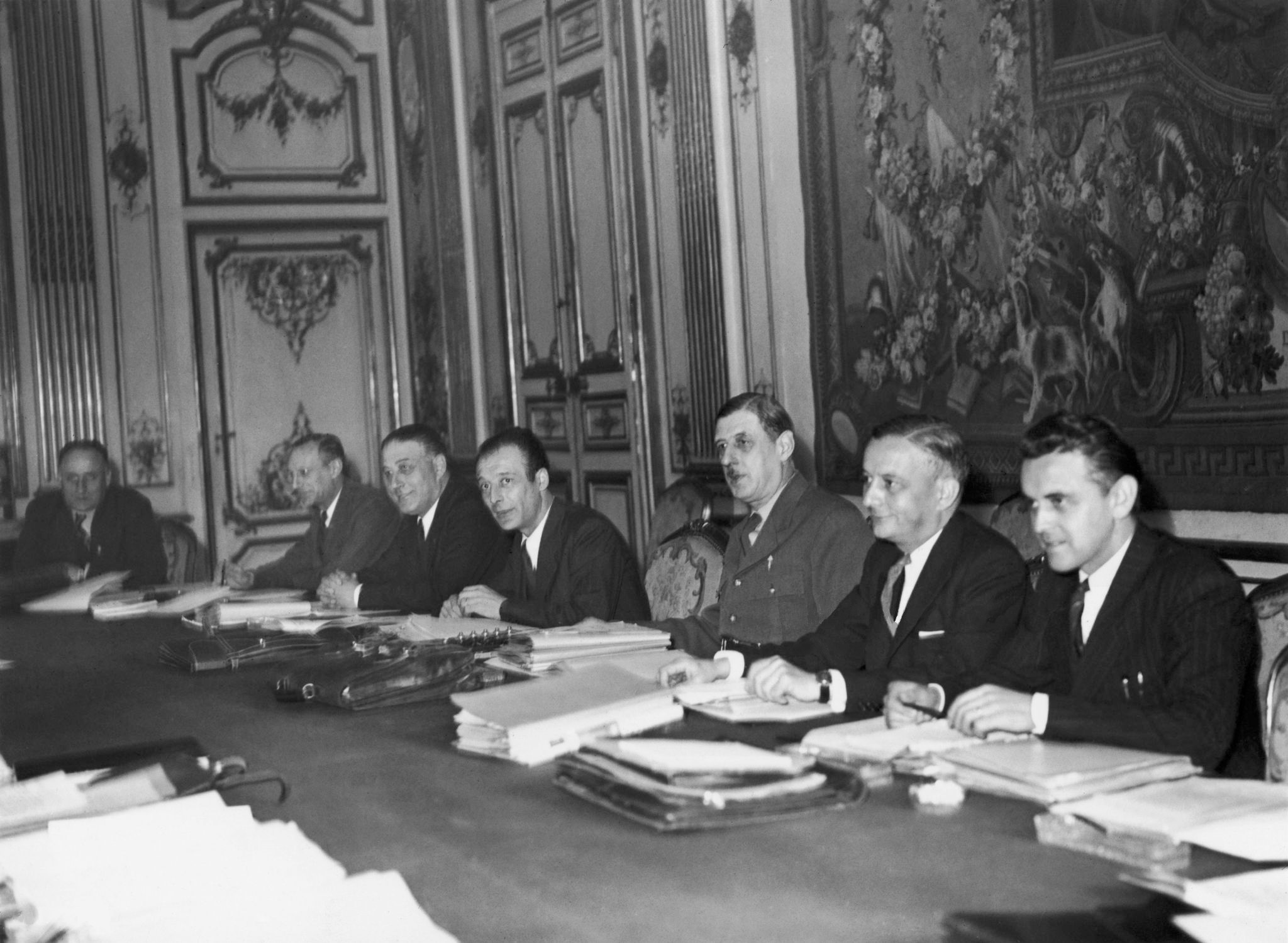
Council of Ministers of the Provisional Government meeting in Paris, 2 November 1945

The PGFR was created by the Committee of National Liberation on 3 June 1944, the day before de Gaulle arrived in London from Algiers on Winston Churchill's invitation, and three days before D-day. It moved back to Paris after the liberation of the capital, where its war and foreign policy goals were to secure a French occupation zone in Germany and a permanent seat on the United Nations Security Council. This was assured through a large military contribution on the western front.

Besides war and foreign policy goals, its principal mission was to prepare the transition to a new constitutional order, that ultimately resulted in the Fourth Republic. It also made several important reforms and political decisions, such as granting women the right to vote, founding the École nationale d'administration, and laying the groundwork of social security in France.

With regard to transition to a new Republic, the GPRF organized the 1945 French legislative election for 21 October 1945, drew up a Constitution to present to the public for approval, and organized the Constitutional referendum on 13 October 1946 in which it was adopted by the voters, thus bringing into existence the Fourth Republic.

=== Fourth Republic ===
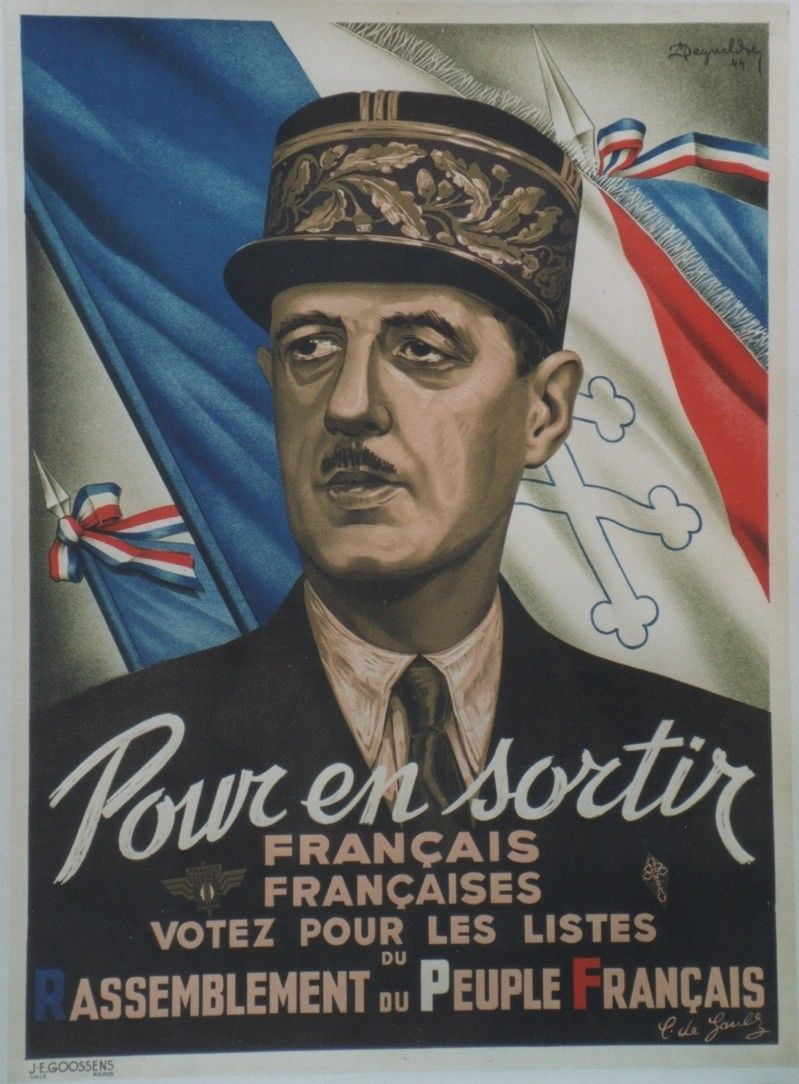
Campaign poster for Charles de Gaulle's RPF party: "We can overcome this; My fellow French citizens, vote for the Rassemblement du Peuple Français slate". Lithograph, Paris, 1944–1947

With most of the political class discredited and containing many members who had more or less collaborated with Nazi Germany, Gaullism and communism became the most popular political forces in France.

The Provisional Government (GPRF) ruled from 1944 to 1946, with de Gaulle in charge. Meanwhile, negotiations took place over the proposed new constitution, which was to be put to a referendum. De Gaulle advocated a presidential system of government, and criticized the reinstatement of what he pejoratively called "the parties system". He resigned in January 1946 and was replaced by Felix Gouin of the French Section of the Workers' International (socialists; SFIO). Ultimately, only the French Communist Party (PCF) and the socialist SFIO supported the draft constitution, which envisaged a form of government based on unicameralism; but this was rejected in the referendum of 5 May 1946.

For the 1946 elections, the Rally of Left Republicans (RGR), which encompassed the Radical Party, the Democratic and Socialist Union of the Resistance and other conservative parties, unsuccessfully attempted to oppose the Christian democrat and socialist MRP–SFIO–PCF alliance. The new constituent assembly included 166 MRP deputies, 153 PCF deputies and 128 SFIO deputies, giving the tripartite alliance an absolute majority. Georges Bidault of the MRP replaced Felix Gouin as the head of government.

A new draft of the Constitution was written, which this time proposed the establishment of a bicameral form of government. Leon Blum of the SFIO headed the GPRF from 1946 to 1947. After a new legislative election in June 1946, the Christian democrat Georges Bidault assumed leadership of the Cabinet. Despite De Gaulle's so-called discourse of Bayeux of 16 June 1946 in which he denounced the new institutions, the new draft was approved by 53% of voters voting in favor (with an abstention rate of 31%) in the referendum of 13 October 1946. This culminated in the establishment of the Fourth Republic two weeks later, an arrangement in which executive power essentially resided in the hands of the President of the Council (the prime minister). The President of the Republic was given a largely symbolic role, although he remained chief of the French Army and as a last resort could be called upon to resolve conflicts.

== Impact ==
=== Demographic ===
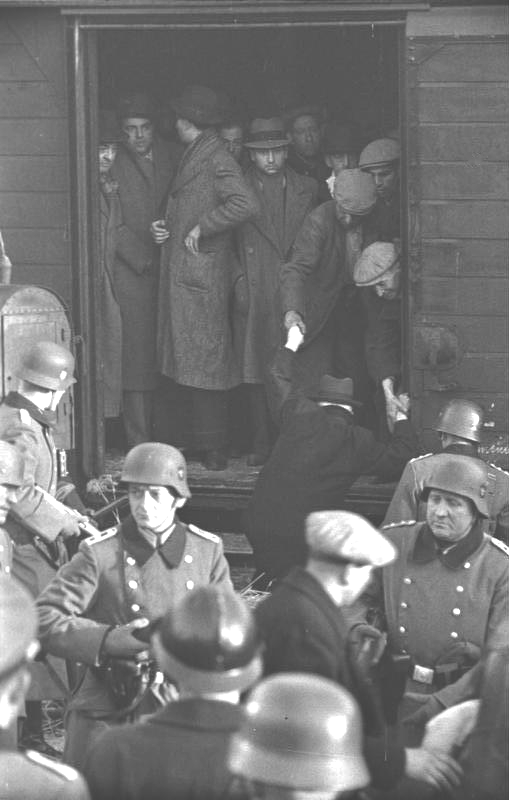
Deportation of Jews during the Marseille roundup, 23 January 1943

France's losses during World War II totaled 600,000 people (1.44% of the population), including 210,000 military deaths from all causes, and 390,000 civilian deaths due to military activity and crimes against humanity. In addition they suffered 390,000 wounded military.

Jewish life and society at large had to adjust to a reduced population of French Jews. Of the 340,000 Jews living in metropolitan/continental France in 1940, more than 75,000 were deported to death camps by the Vichy regime, where about 72,500 were killed.

=== Economic ===
France emerged from World War II severely weakened economically. It had been in a period of economic stagnation even when the war broke out. By 1945 national income, in real terms, was little more than half what it had been in 1929.

To aid economic recovery, the Chairman of the French Provisional Government, Charles de Gaulle, established the General Planning Commission (Le Commissariat général du Plan) on 3 January 1946. The Commission implemented the Modernization and Re-equipment Plan, commonly known as the Monnet Plan after Jean Monnet, the chief advocate and the first head of the commission.

To help finance imports of capital equipment and raw materials needed for France's recovery and modernization program, the country negotiated loans from the U.S. and the World Bank in 1946. Also, from 1948 to 1952, France received just under $3 billion in Marshall Plan aid.

Yergin and Stanislaw argue France's post-war Modernization and Re-equipment Plan set it on the road to an "economic miracle" in the 1950s.

=== Judicial ===
Many leaders and collaborators of the Vichy regime were arrested, and some were imprisoned or sentenced to death. Marshall Petain's death sentence was commuted to life due to his status as a World War I hero. Pierre Laval was tried, and executed by firing squad in October 1945.

Some former collaborators escaped immediate penalties or even continued conventional lives, such as Maurice Papon, who was arrested and convicted in 1998 of crimes against humanity for his role in the deportation of Jews from Bordeaux. German war criminal Klaus Barbie, known as the "butcher of Lyon", was extradited from Bolivia in 1983. He was put on trial and sentenced in 1987 to life imprisonment in Lyon. He died in 1991.

=== Historiographical ===
For decades prior to the 1970s modern period, French historiography was dominated by conservative or pro-Communist thinking, neither of them very inclined to consider the grass-roots pro-democracy developments at liberation.

There was little recognition in French scholarship on the active participation of the Vichy regime in the deportation of French Jews, until American political scientist Robert Paxton's 1972 book, Vichy France: Old Guard and New Order, 1940–1944. The book received a French translation within a year and sold thousands of copies in France. In the words of French historian Gérard Noiriel, the book "had the effect of a bombshell, because it showed, with supporting evidence, that the French state had participated in the deportation of Jews to the Nazi concentration camps, a fact that had been concealed by historians until then."

The "Paxtonian revolution", as the French called it, had a profound effect on French historiography. In 1997, Paxton was called as an expert witness to testify about collaboration during the Vichy period, at the trial in France of Maurice Papon.

=== Social and cultural ===
Many were concerned with getting life back to the way it was, "a l'identique", as it was described, but leaders said that modernization was needed. As Jean Monnet said, "We have no choice. The only alternative to modernization is decadence." The question of what this would look like was not obvious, and was one of the core political issues, from liberation to Algerian independence.

The Second World War had devastated the glittering art and literary effervescence of the Années folles in 1920s Paris, as well as the many Jewish, émigré and refugee artists and writers who had formed the School of Paris between the two world wars. Marc Chagall escaped to safety in the US with the help of American journalist Varian Fry, but he was one of the lucky, and while he eventually returned to France, he never went back to Paris. The poet Max Jacob on the other hand had died of pneumonia in the camp at Drancy, and Chaïm Soutine died of a bleeding ulcer while hiding from the Nazis in Paris.

After the liberation of France, artists and writers returned, but for the most part they were other artists who made another kind of art. Their themes were no longer color, surrealism and Dada, but mirrored the industrialization of France in their exploration of abstract geometry and the influence of Rothko. Existentialist writers expressed absurdity not as a riot of surrealism but instead as an epistemology of ambiguous moral choices and rejection of outside moral authority.

But Ernest Hemingway returned with the Allied army and left as a calling card a bucket of hand grenades at the door of Pablo Picasso, who had returned to Paris after the Germans overran his rural refuge; Guernica had made it impossible for him to consider a return to Franco's Spain. Miles Davis lived in Paris after the war, and so did Norman Mailer and Samuel Beckett, Simone Signoret and Jean Cocteau. Charles de Gaulle appointed André Malraux as Minister of Information and then of Cultural Affairs.

=== Political ===
The liberation of France had profound effect on the future of French and world politics.

Fourth Republic

The provisional government maintained its position that the Vichy régime had been illegitimate, and therefore considered it a priority to put a Constitutional framework into place. The resulting document full-throatedly reaffirmed the Declaration of the Rights of Man, and affirmed several additional rights, including the right of asylum, of unionization and of freedom of association. As of the very first municipal elections following the liberation of France, women had the right to vote, and from then forward under the Fourth Republic.

The French Fifth Republic today is built upon the rights expressed in the preface to this document, which it incorporated into its 1958 constitution, and which is still in force today.

Communist Party

The trained and disciplined Francs-Tireurs et Partisans brought into play by the Communist International after Hitler invaded Russia both helped to sway the fight and to dispel the previous perception of under the Third Republic of left-wing politicians as decadent and ineffectual, a disdain that to some extent had underlain the willingness of that government to seek the assistance of the paternalist and traditionalist Pétain, who had gained the heart of the French by prioritizing the conservation of French forces, following bloodying and bruising casualties in World War 1 on the Eastern front against Germany.

Geopolitics

Given the important role played by the Big Three in the eventual victory of the Allies, the liberation of France and of Europe led to the geopolitics of the Cold War, and to the decolonization of French and other European former colonies in Africa and elsewhere.

The creation of the United Nations closely followed the end of World War II. As a successor to the League of Nations whose demise foreshadowed World War II, it did however share some of its flaws, in particular the lack of an army and therefore the means to enforce its charter.

Decolonization

While Félix Éboué believed that his support of Free France would lead to a new relationship between France and French Africa, the French were initially inclined to dismiss the considerable contribution of African units to the war effort. In fact, on 1 December 1944, gendarmes mowed down a regiment of Tirailleurs Senegalais at the Thiaroye camp for complaining of poor conditions and demanding their back pay.

Morocco and Tunisia, which were French protectorates in World War II, and with the exception of Casablanca, played a more limited role in the war, primarily in the Western Desert campaign, were able to negotiate their independence from France relatively quickly. Algeria, however, which had since 1848 been considered an integral part of France, and had a sizeable population of French settlers, suffered through an extensive and bloody war of independence.

A series of events beginning 8 May 1945, the same day that Nazi Germany surrendered, triggered growing demand for independence. About 5,000 Muslims paraded in Sétif, a market town west of Constantine, to celebrate the victory. The local French gendarmerie tried to seize banners attacking colonial rule and rioting broke out. The ensuing indiscriminate French reprisals sparked further denunciations of colonial rule.

== See also ==
- 20th-century French art – Art in France during the 20th century
- 1940 in France
- 1941 in France
- 1942 in France
- 1943 in France
- 1944 in France
- 1945 in France
- Foreign policy of Charles de Gaulle – French foreign policy in 1940–1946 and 1959–1969
- France–Germany border – International border
- French Liberation Army – Reunified French Armed Forces during WWII
- Liberation of Europe – Final battles as well as the surrender by Nazi Germany
- Military history of France during World War II
- Post–World War II economic expansion – Long period of worldwide economic growth following World War II
- René Bousquet
- Royal Air Forces Escaping Society
- SOE F Section networks
- Timeline of the Battle of France
- Timeline of the liberation of France – Aspect of French history
