= Foreign policy of Charles de Gaulle =

French foreign policy in 1940–1946 and 1959–1969

The foreign policy of Charles de Gaulle covers the diplomacy of Charles de Gaulle as French leader 1940–1946 and 1959–1969, along with his followers and successors.

== Free France (1940–1944) ==
Prime Minister Winston Churchill and his top aides Foreign Minister Anthony Eden, and Chief of the Imperial General Staff General Alan Brooke in 1940-41 moved quickly to establish a base for de Gaulle in London. Control of the overseas French Empire was seen as the central issue, and the British government was prepared to use military support to help de Gaulle regain control. De Gaulle set up a shadow government, including a French National Council and a Resistance movement inside both Vichy France and German-controlled France. To establish his own leadership over like-minded Frenchmen, de Gaulle began broadcasting to France using BBC facilities. De Gaulle was especially keen to set up a Resistance movement inside France, However, many top British officials, as well as Roosevelt and sometimes even Churchill, still hoped for an understanding with Vichy France under Philippe Pétain. De Gaulle was totally opposed to any such relationship. Friction with Churchill's government continued to the end of 1942, centering around plans for the Anglo-American invasion of North Africa. On that matter the United States played the dominant role. Roosevelt continued to recognize the Vichy government, with Ambassador William D. Leahy in residence in Vichy. The embassy was finally closed when Germany seized control of Vichy France in late 1942.

In June 1941, British and Free French troops invaded Syria, then part of the Vichy overseas empire and used as a base by Nazi elements. Churchill decided to give Syria independence as a gesture to mollify Arab nationalism. De Gaulle strongly objected as he needed it for his base of operations in the Middle East. At one point Churchill was ready 108 to 11 to remove de Gaulle as head of the Free French. De Gaulle had no choice except to acquiesce to an independent Syria.

The command situation in North Africa was especially complex, with Roosevelt preferring François Darlan, The senior Vichy official who happened to be in command for Algeria when the invasion took place. Dwight D. Eisenhower, the Allied commander on the spot recognized Darlan as commander of all French forces in the area and recognized his self-nomination as High Commissioner of France (head of civil government) for North and West Africa on 14 November. In return, on 10 November, Darlan ordered all French forces to join the Allies. His order was obeyed; not only in French North Africa, but also by the Vichy forces in French West Africa with its potentially useful facilities at Dakar. After Darlan was assassinated in December 1942, Roosevelt preferred General Henri Giraud. Roosevelt had met with de Gaulle in Washington, but never hid his distrust and distaste. De Gaulle In turn never forgave the Americans for this humiliation.

== Provisional Government of the French Republic (1944–1946) ==
=== Postwar planning ===
During the winter of 1944–45, there were a number of minor disagreements between the French and the other Allies. The British ambassador to France Duff Cooper said that de Gaulle seemed to seek out real or imagined insults to take offence at whatever possible. De Gaulle believed Britain and the US were intending to keep their armies in France after the war and were secretly working to take over its overseas possessions and to prevent it from regaining its political and economic strength. In late October he complained that the Allies were failing to adequately arm and equip the new French army and instructed Bidault to use the French veto at the European Council.

De Gaulle and the Free French were largely excluded from the postwar planning by Roosevelt, Churchill and Stalin, and ignored by the U.S. State Department. It was humiliating for de Gaulle. The Americans and to a lesser extent the British distrusted de Gaulle's usefulness and leadership of France. De Gaulle was not invited to summit meetings at Tehran, Yalta or Potsdam. At the Casablanca Conference on 24 January 1943, Giraud was present but de Gaulle at first refused but then accepted an invitation. Roosevelt and Churchill between themselves drafted an agreement on how liberated France would be governed. They agreed on a merger between Giraud's Algiers Imperial Council and de Gaulle's London-based French National Committee. However Roosevelt's original draft called for General Giraud to be in charge. Churchill secured major changes that gave responsibility to the French National Committee under de Gaulle. In 1945 France was given one of the five seats on the UN Security Council, with a veto, as well as a zone of Germany. Nevertheless, it was kept from actually taking a leadership role regarding the UN or Germany. The French were angry at not being invited to Potsdam, but they did fairly well in the end.

=== Confrontation in Syria and Lebanon ===
On VE Day, there were also serious riots in French Tunisia. A dispute with Britain over control of Syria and Lebanon quickly developed into an unpleasant diplomatic incident that demonstrated France's weaknesses. In April, de Gaulle sent General Beynet to establish an air base in Syria and a naval base in Lebanon, provoking an outbreak of nationalism in which some French nationals were attacked and killed. On 20 May, French artillery and warplanes fired on demonstrators in Damascus. After several days, upwards of 800 Syrians lay dead.

Churchill's relationship with de Gaulle was now at rock bottom. In January he told a colleague that he believed that de Gaulle was "a great danger to peace and for Great Britain. After five years of experience, I am convinced that he is the worst enemy of France in her troubles ... he is one of the greatest dangers to European peace.... I am sure that in the long run no understanding will be reached with General de Gaulle".

On 31 May, Churchill told de Gaulle "immediately to order French troops to cease fire and withdraw to their barracks". British forces moved in and forced the French to withdraw from the city; they were then escorted and confined to barracks. With this political pressure added, the French ordered a ceasefire; De Gaulle raged but France was isolated and suffering a diplomatic humiliation. The secretary of the Arab League Edward Atiyah said, "France put all her cards and two rusty pistols on the table". De Gaulle saw it as a heinous Anglo-Saxon conspiracy: he told the British ambassador Duff Cooper, "I recognise that we are not in a position to wage war against you, but you have betrayed France and betrayed the West. That cannot be forgotten".

=== French Indochina ===
At the Potsdam Conference in July, to which de Gaulle was not invited, a decision was made to divide Vietnam, which had been a French colony for over a hundred years, into British and Chinese spheres of influence. Soon after the surrender of Japan in August 1945, de Gaulle sent the French Far East Expeditionary Corps to re-establish French sovereignty in French Indochina. However, Ho Chi Minh, leader of the Viet Minh independence movement, declared independence of Vietnam in September, and the First Indochina War broke out that lasted until France was defeated in 1954.

== Presidency (1959–1969) ==
=== Politics of Grandeur ===
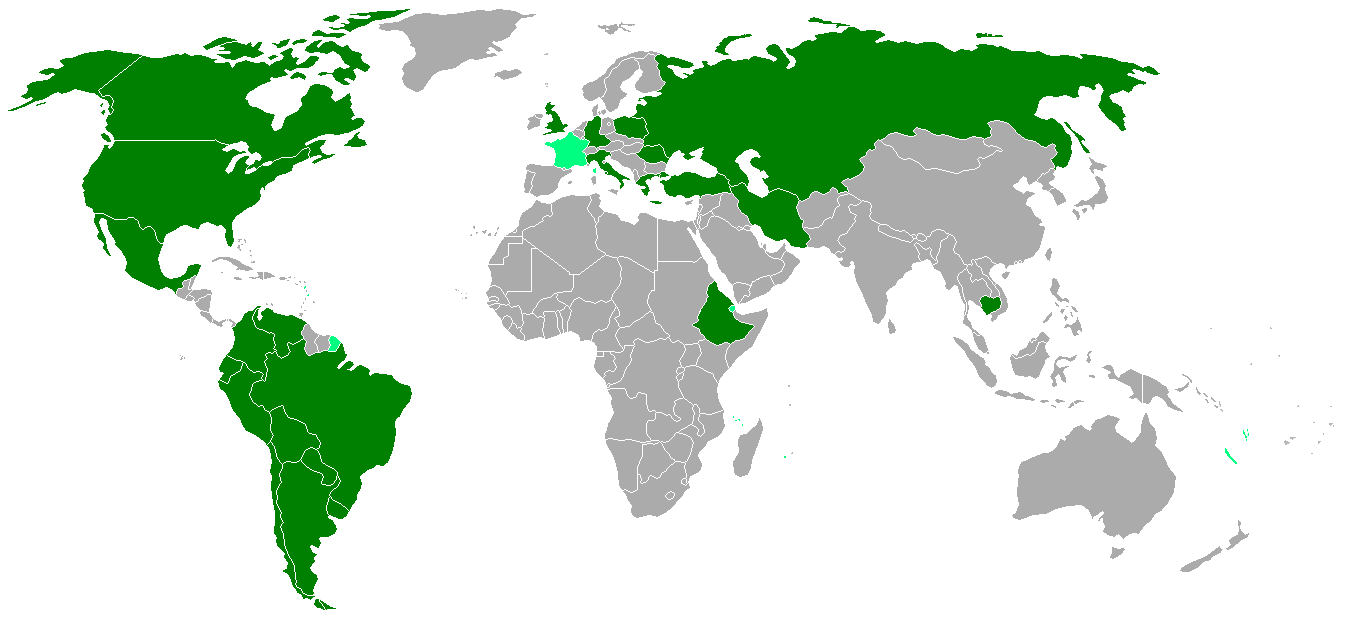
Countries visited by de Gaulle during his presidency

Proclaiming that grandeur was the essential to the nature of France, de Gaulle initiated his "Politics of Grandeur". He demanded complete autonomy for France in world affairs, which meant that it has its major decisions which could not be forced upon it by NATO, the European Community or anyone else. De Gaulle pursued a policy of "national independence." He twice vetoed Britain's entry into the Common Market, fearing it might overshadow France in European affairs. While not officially abandoning NATO, he withdrew from its military integrated command, fearing that the United States had too much control over NATO. He launched an independent nuclear development program that made France the fourth nuclear power.

=== French colonies ===
One of de Gaulle's geopolitical priorities was maintaining and further expanding French economic and political power in its former colonies. This was not only done through official diplomacy and through the SDECE, but also through bridge figures such as de Gaulle's close confidant Jacques Foccart. The latter built up a network of informal relations with authoritarian leaders (most notably Omar Bongo, Félix Houphouët-Boigny and Léopold Sédar Senghor) throughout French-speaking Africa.

==== Algeria ====
The May 1958 seizure of power in Algiers by French army units and French settlers opposed to concessions in the face of Arab nationalist insurrection ripped apart the unstable Fourth Republic. The National Assembly brought him back to power during the May 1958 crisis. De Gaulle founded the Fifth Republic with a strengthened presidency, and he was elected in the latter role. He managed to keep France together while taking steps to end the war, much to the anger of the Pieds-Noirs (Frenchmen settled in Algeria) and the military; both previously had supported his return to power to maintain colonial rule. He granted independence to Algeria in 1962 and progressively to other French colonies.

==== French West Africa ====
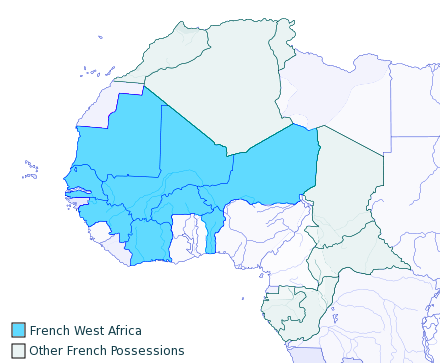
French West Africa before it broke into smaller independent states.

French conservatives were disillusioned with the colonial experience after the disasters in Indochina and Algeria. They wanted to cut all ties to the numerous colonies in French Sub-Saharan Africa. During the war, de Gaulle had successfully based his Free France movement and the African colonies. After a visit in 1958, he made a commitment to make sub-Saharan French Africa a major component of his foreign-policy. All the colonies in 1958, except Guinea, voted to remain in the French Community, with representation in Parliament and a guarantee of French aid. In practice, nearly all the colonies became independent in the late 1950s, but maintained very strong connections. Under close supervision from the president, French advisors played a major role in civil and military affairs, thwarted coups, and, occasionally, replaced upstart local leaders. The French colonial system had always been based primarily on local leadership, in sharp contrast to the situation in British colonies. The French colonial goal had been to assimilate the natives into mainstream French culture, with a strong emphasis on the French language. From de Gaulle's point of view, close association gave legitimacy to his visions of global client grandeur, certified his humanitarian credentials, provided access to oil, uranium and other minerals, and provided a small but steady market for French manufacturers. Above all it guaranteed the vitality of French language and culture in a large slice of the world that was rapidly growing in population. De Gaulle's successors Georges Pompidou (1969–74) and Valéry Giscard d'Estaing (1974-1981) continued de Gaulle's African policy. It was supported with French military units, and a large naval presence in the Indian Ocean. Over 260,000 Frenchmen worked in Africa, focused especially on delivering oil supplies. There was some effort to build up oil refineries and aluminum smelters, but little effort to develop small-scale local industry, which the French wanted to monopolize for the mainland. Senegal, Ivory Coast, Gabon, and Cameroon were the largest and most reliable African allies, and received most of the investments. During the Nigerian Civil War (1967–1970), France supported breakaway Biafra, but only on a limited scale, providing mercenaries and obsolete weaponry. De Gaulle's goals were to protect its nearby ex-colonies from Nigeria, to stop Soviet advances, and to acquire a foothold in the oil-rich Niger delta.

==== Guadeloupe ====
De Gaulle later visited Guadeloupe for two days, in the aftermath of Hurricane Inez, bringing aid which totaled billions of francs.

=== European Economic Community (EEC) ===
France, experiencing the disintegration of its colonial empire and severe problems in Algeria, turned towards Europe after the Suez Crisis, and to West Germany in particular.

One of the conditions of Marshall Aid was that the nations' leaders must co-ordinate economic efforts and pool the supply of raw materials. By far the most critical commodities in driving growth were coal and steel. France assumed it would receive large amounts of high-quality German coal from the Ruhr as reparations for the war, but the US refused to allow this, fearing a repetition of the bitterness after the Treaty of Versailles which partly caused World War II.

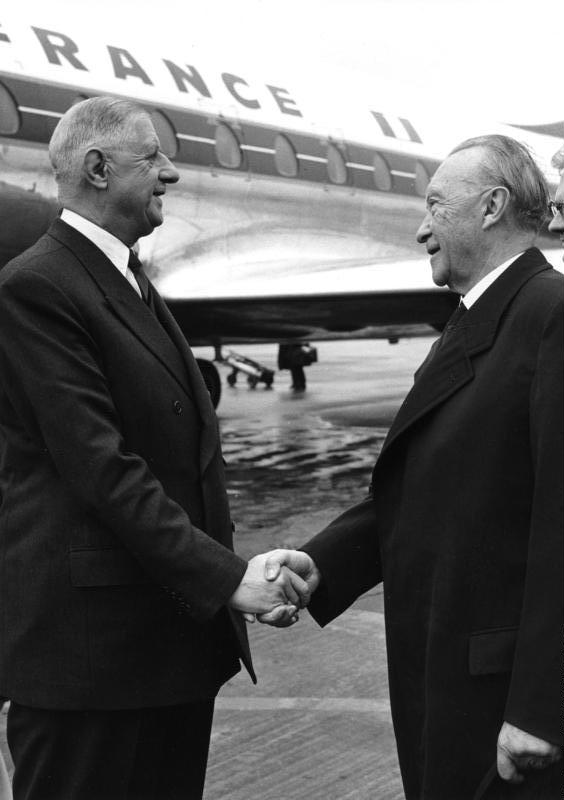
De Gaulle and Konrad Adenauer in 1961

Under the inspiration of the French statesmen Jean Monnet and Robert Schuman, together with the German leader Konrad Adenauer, the rift between the two nations had begun to heal and in 1951, along with Italy and the Benelux countries, they formed the European Coal and Steel Community. Following the Treaty of Rome of 1957, this became the European Economic Community.

De Gaulle had not been instrumental in setting up the new organization and, from the start, he opposed efforts by fellow EEC member countries to move toward some form of political integration that, in de Gaulle's thinking, would impinge on the sovereignty of France, both internally and externally. To counter those supranational tendencies that he disparaged, he put forward in 1961 the so-called Fouchet Plan that maintained all decision-making powers in the hands of governments, reducing the projected European parliamentary assembly to a mere consultative assembly. As expected, the plan was rejected by France's partners. In July 1965, de Gaulle provoked a major six-month crisis when he ordered the boycott of EEC institutions (see Empty chair crisis below) until his demands – the withdrawal of a European Commission proposal to reinforce the community institutions to the detriment of national sovereignty, and the acceptance of France's proposal regarding the financing of the newly established Common Agricultural Policy (CAP) – were met with the Luxembourg compromise.

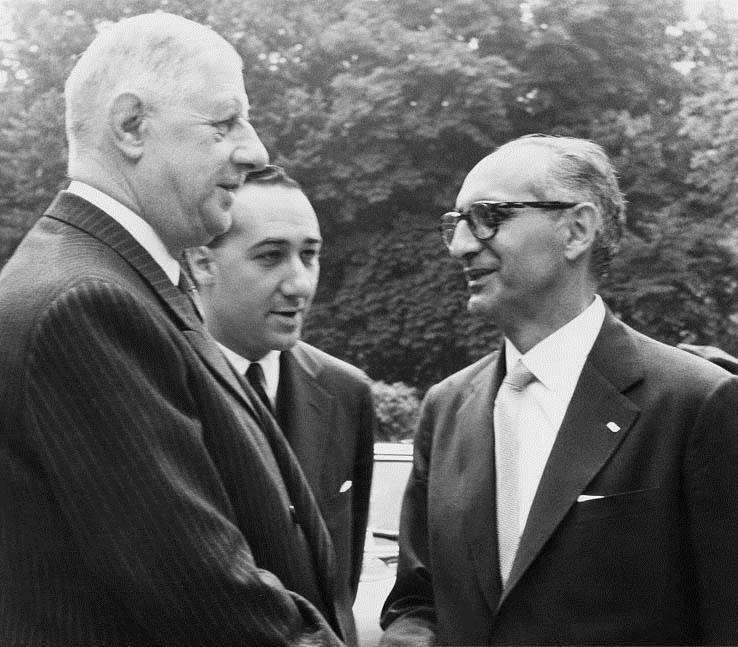
Charles de Gaulle and Argentine president Arturo Frondizi

De Gaulle, who in spite of recent history admired Germany and spoke excellent German, as well as English, established a good relationship with the aging West German Chancellor Konrad Adenauer—culminating in the Elysee Treaty in 1963—and in the first few years of the Common Market, France's industrial exports to the other five members tripled and its farm export almost quadrupled. The franc became a solid, stable currency for the first time in half a century, and the economy mostly boomed. Adenauer however, all too aware of the importance of American support in Europe, gently distanced himself from the general's more extreme ideas, wanting no suggestion that any new European community would in any sense challenge or set itself at odds with the US. In Adenauer's eyes, the support of the US was more important than any question of European prestige. Adenauer was also anxious to reassure Britain that nothing was being done behind its back and was quick to inform British Prime Minister Harold Macmillan of any new developments.

Great Britain initially declined to join the EEC, preferring to remain with another organisation known as the European Free Trade Area, mostly consisting of the northern European countries and Portugal. By the late 1950s, German and French living standards began to exceed those in Britain, and the government of Harold Macmillan, realising that the EEC was a stronger trade bloc than EFTA, began negotiations to join.

De Gaulle vetoed the British application to join the European Economic Community (EEC) in 1963, famously uttering the single word 'non' into the television cameras at the critical moment, a statement used to sum up French opposition towards Britain for many years afterwards. Macmillan said afterwards that he always believed that de Gaulle would prevent Britain joining, but thought he would do it quietly, behind the scenes. He later complained privately that "all our plans are in tatters".

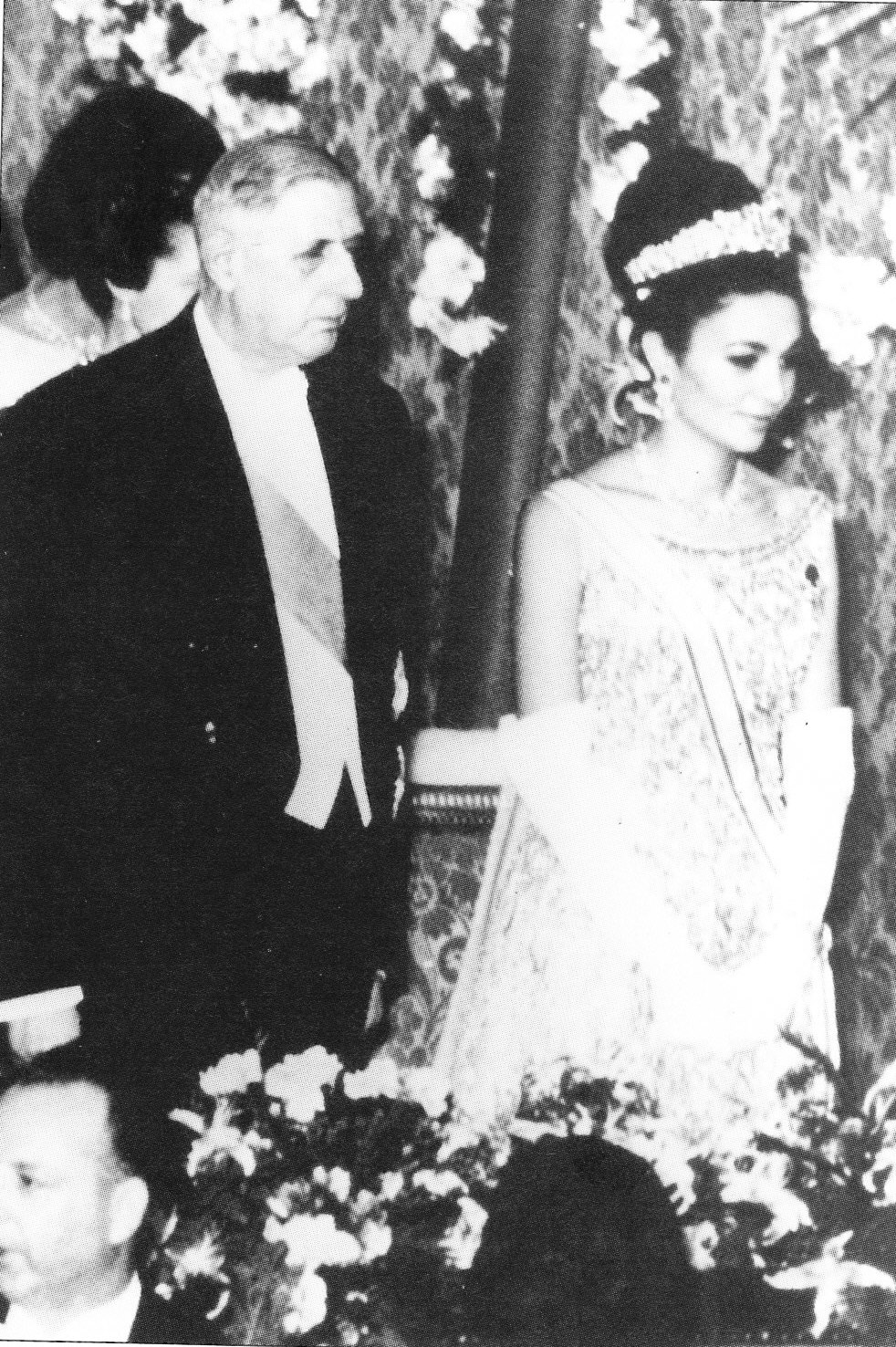
Iranian Empress Farah Pahlavi meeting with Charles de Gaulle in France, 1961

American President John F. Kennedy urged de Gaulle to accept the United Kingdom in the EEC, stating that a Europe without Great Britain would create a situation in which the United States were bearing the enormous costs of Europe's protection without any voice. Kennedy applied pressure to de Gaulle by threatening to withdraw American troops from European soil, but de Gaulle believed that the United States would lose the Cold War if they were to leave Europe. It encouraged de Gaulle to see Great Britain as America's "Trojan Horse".

British Prime Minister Churchill once said to him that if he had the choice between France and the United States, he would always choose the United States. Churchill's successor, Macmillan, prioritised the rebuilding of the Anglo-American "Special Relationship". With the American agreement to supply Britain with the Skybolt nuclear missile, de Gaulle thought that the United Kingdom would not go along with his vision for a West European strategically independent from the United States. He maintained there were incompatibilities between continental European and British economic interests. In addition, he demanded that the United Kingdom accept all the conditions laid down by the six existing members of the EEC (Belgium, France, West Germany, Italy, Luxembourg, Netherlands) and revoke its commitments to countries within its own free trade area (which France had not done with its own). He supported a deepening and an acceleration of Common Market integration rather than an expansion.

However, in this latter respect, a detailed study of the formative years of the EEC argues that the defence of French economic interests, especially in agriculture, in fact played a more dominant role in determining de Gaulle's stance towards British entry than the various political and foreign policy considerations that have often been cited.

Dean Acheson believed that Britain made a grave error in not signing up to European integration right from the start, and that they continued to suffer the political consequences for at least two decades afterwards. However, he also stated his belief that de Gaulle used the 'Common Market' (as it was then termed) as an "exclusionary device to direct European trade towards the interest of France and against that of the United States, Britain and other countries."

Claiming continental European solidarity, de Gaulle again rejected British entry when they next applied to join the community in December 1967 under the Labour leadership of Harold Wilson. During negotiations, de Gaulle chided Britain for relying too much on the Americans, saying that sooner or later they would always do what was in their best interests. Wilson said he then gently raised the spectre of the threat of a newly powerful Germany as a result of the EEC, which de Gaulle agreed was a risk. After de Gaulle left office the United Kingdom applied again and finally became a member of the EEC in January 1973.

=== Latin America ===
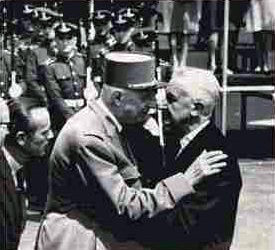
De Gaulle and Argentine president Arturo Illia in 1964

During the autumn of 1964, de Gaulle embarked on a grueling 20,000-mile trek across Latin America despite being a month away from his 75th birthday, a recent operation for prostate cancer, and concerns over security. He had visited Mexico the previous year and spoke, in Spanish, to the Mexican people on the eve of their celebrations of their independence at the Palacio Nacional in Mexico City. During his new 26-day visit, he was again keen to gain both cultural and economic influence. He spoke constantly of his resentment of US influence in Latin America—"that some states should establish a power of political or economic direction outside their own borders". Yet France could provide no investment or aid to match that from Washington.

=== NATO ===
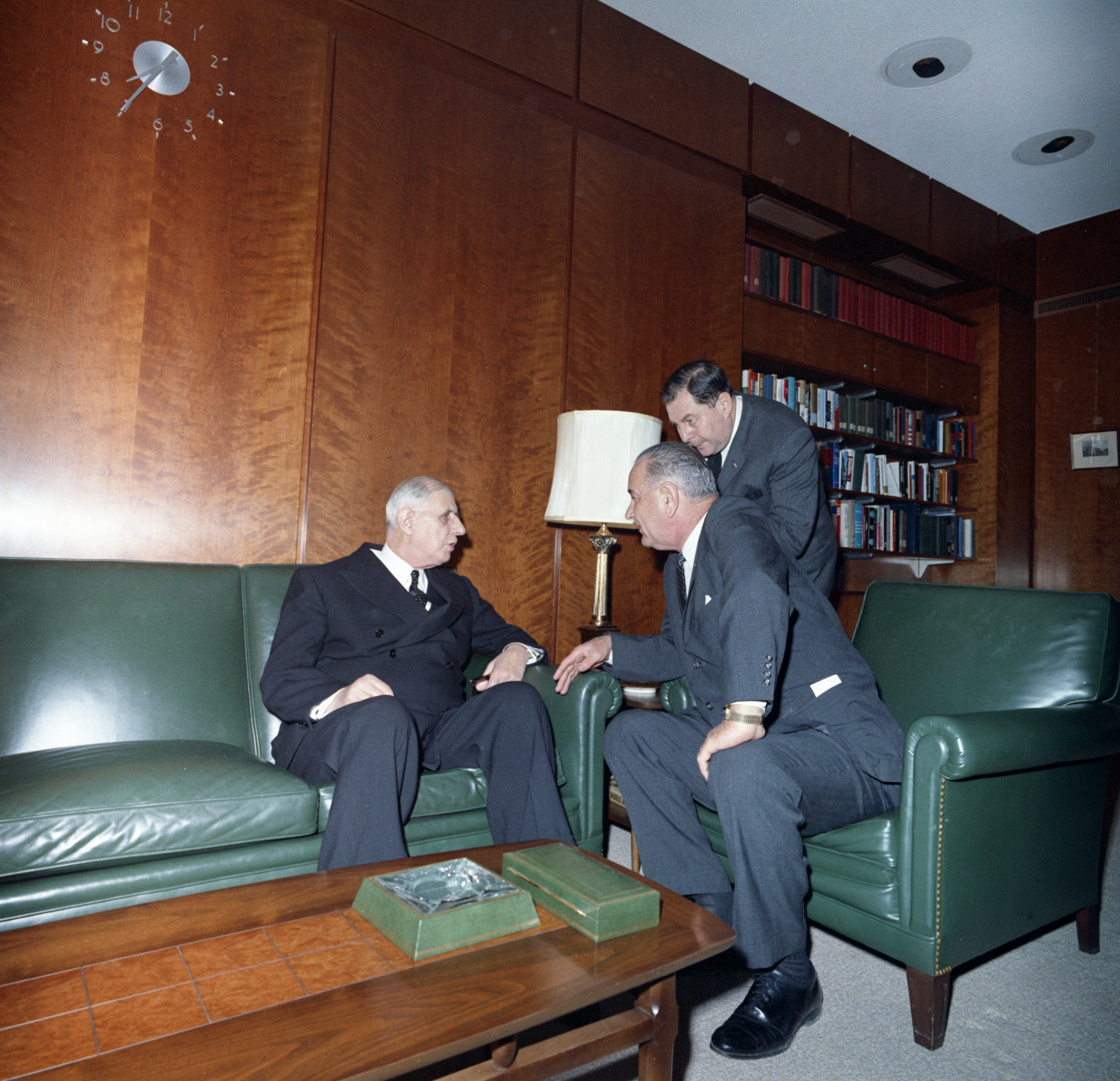
De Gaulle with President Lyndon B. Johnson in Washington, D.C., 1963

With the onset of the Cold War and the perceived threat of invasion from the Soviet Union and the countries of the eastern bloc, the United States, Canada and a number of western European countries set up the North Atlantic Treaty Organization (NATO) to co-ordinate a military response to any possible attack. France played a key role during the early days of the organisation, providing a large military contingent and agreeing—after much soul-searching—to the participation of West German forces. But after his election in 1958 Charles de Gaulle took the view that the organisation was too dominated by the US and UK, and that America would not fulfill its promise to defend Europe in the event of a Soviet invasion.

De Gaulle demanded political parity with Britain and America in NATO, and for its geographic coverage to be extended to include French territories abroad, then experiencing civil war. This was not forthcoming, and so in March 1959 France, citing the need for it to maintain its own independent military strategy, withdrew its Mediterranean Fleet (ALESCMED) from NATO, and a few months later de Gaulle demanded the removal of all US nuclear weapons from French territory.

De Gaulle hosted a superpower summit on 17 May 1960 for arms limitation talks and détente efforts in the wake of the 1960 U-2 incident between United States President Dwight Eisenhower, Soviet Premier Nikita Khrushchev, and United Kingdom Prime Minister Harold Macmillan. De Gaulle's warm relations with Eisenhower were noticed by United States military observers at that time. De Gaulle told Eisenhower: "Obviously you cannot apologize but you must decide how you wish to handle this. I will do everything I can to be helpful without being openly partisan." When Khrushchev condemned the United States U-2 flights, de Gaulle expressed to Khrushchev his disapproval of 18 near-simultaneous secret Soviet satellite overflights of French territory; Khrushchev denied knowledge of the satellite overflights. Lieutenant General Vernon A. Walters wrote that after Khrushchev left, "De Gaulle came over to Eisenhower and took him by the arm. He took me also by the elbow and, taking us a little apart, he said to Eisenhower, 'I do not know what Khrushchev is going to do, nor what is going to happen, but whatever he does, I want you to know that I am with you to the end.' I was astounded at this statement, and Eisenhower was clearly moved by his unexpected expression of unconditional support". General Walters was struck by de Gaulle's "unconditional support" of the United States during that "crucial time". De Gaulle then tried to revive the talks by inviting all the delegates to another conference at the Élysée Palace to discuss the situation, but the summit ultimately dissolved in the wake of the U-2 incident.

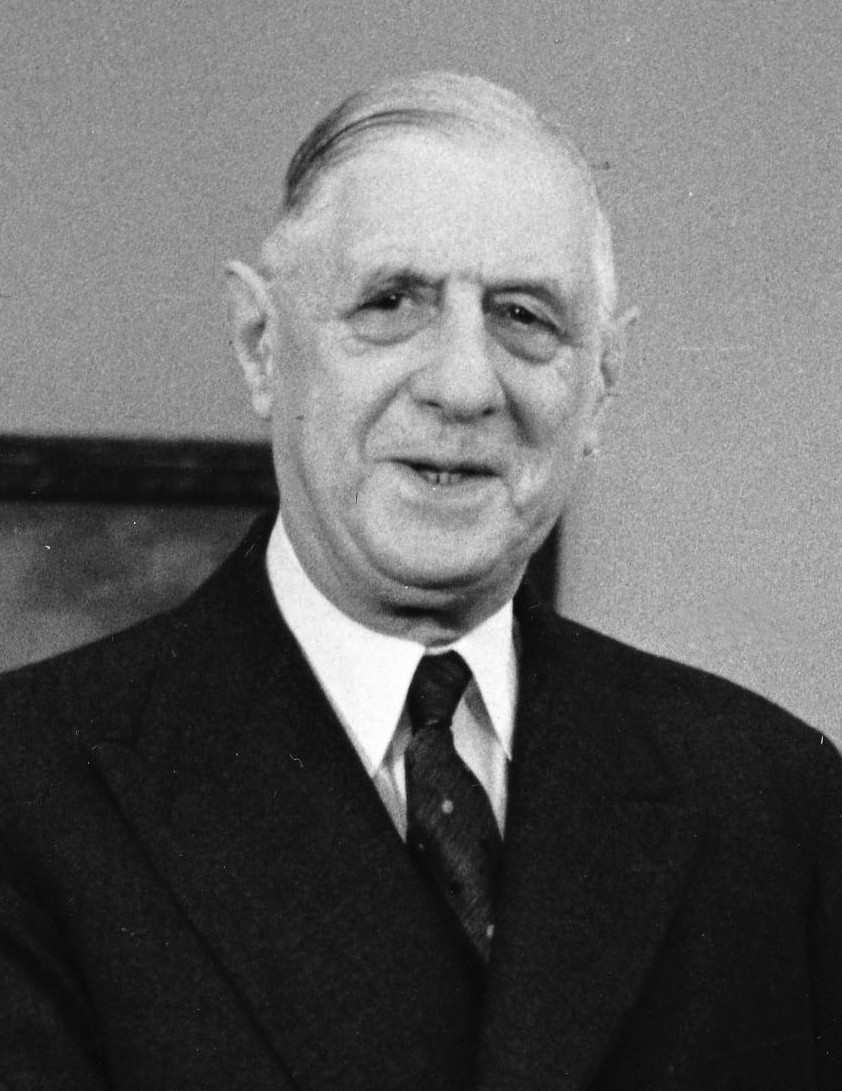
De Gaulle in 1963

In 1964, de Gaulle visited the Soviet Union, where he hoped to establish France as an alternative influence in the Cold War. De Gaulle always viewed Communism as a passing phenomenon, and never used the term 'Soviet Union', always calling it Russia. In his view, Russian national interests rather than Communist ideology determined the decision-making in the Kremlin. Later, he proclaimed a new alliance between the nations, but although Soviet premier Alexei Kosygin later visited Paris, the Soviets clearly did not consider France a superpower and knew that they would remain dependent on the NATO alliance in the event of a war. In 1965, de Gaulle pulled France out of SEATO, the southeast Asian equivalent of NATO, and refused to participate in any future NATO maneuvers.

==== Partial withdrawal from NATO in 1966 ====
De Gaulle's vision called for a strong, independent France, armed with nuclear weapons, expecting that his vigor and weapons would enable Paris to deal with Washington on equal terms. He believed that Europe should emancipate itself from America and become a third force in the Cold War where it could rally neutral nations and perhaps reach a détente with the Soviet Union. NATO stood in the way of these goals. De Gaulle protested at the strong role of the United States in NATO. He considered the "special relationship" between the U.S. and the UK to be too close and too detrimental to the French role in Europe. The existing NATO situation gave the United States veto power on nuclear weapons and thus prevented France from having a fully independent nuclear force of its own. In a memorandum sent to President Dwight D. Eisenhower and Prime Minister Harold Macmillan on 17 September 1958, he proposed a tripartite directorate that would put France on an equal footing with them. He also wanted NATO's coverage to expand to include French Algeria, where France was waging a counter-insurgency and sought NATO assistance. De Gaulle's ideas went nowhere, so he began the development of a Force de dissuasion (an independent French nuclear force). He refused to sign the 1963 agreement against underground nuclear testing. In 1963 he vetoed Britain's entry into the EEC (the European Union). No NATO countries followed his lead. In July 1964, de Gaulle presented West Germany with a clear choice: "Either you [West Germany] follow a policy subordinated to the US or you adopt a policy that is European and independent of the U.S., but not hostile to them." West Germany rejected de Gaulle's ultimatum by pledging total loyalty to the U.S. ending his plan for leadership of Europe. In 1966-67 he withdrew France from NATO's military structure—which required an American to be in command of any NATO military action. He expelled NATO's headquarters and NATO units from French soil. The 15 NATO partners did not ignore De Gaulle's threats. Instead they worked to more closely cooperate with one another to neutralize his countermeasures.

France officially remained a NATO member and finally in 2009 President Nicolas Sarkozy ended France's estrangement from NATO, closing the Gaullist chapter. James Ellison explains why Western Europe rejected de Gaulle's vision:

he antagonised his allies in the EEC [European Community] and in the Atlantic Alliance and he worked against the prevailing political atmosphere in the West. That atmosphere ....was a general belief in interdependence and integration and their achievement through a reformed NATO and Atlantic Alliance and an advancing EEC. During the second half of the 1960s, independence and national sovereignty became outmoded and it was amid de Gaulle's pursuit of them that this became clear.

In de Gaulle's very long-term perspective, all that really mattered was the nation state, not ideologies that come and go such as communism. That is, the good relationship of the French state and the Russian state had a higher priority than petty issues such as socialism and capitalism. Breaking through the polarization of the Cold War would allow France to assume a major leadership role in the world. In De Gaulle's view the polarization was furthermore illegitimate, since France had been excluded from Yalta and some other episodes which precipitated the Cold War in 1945–47. By now, he was confident, there was no risk of a European war, and the Soviet Union had so many internal troubles that it was ready for détente. It had split bitterly with China and the two were now engaged in a global battle for control of local Communist movements. His diplomats opened informal discussions with Romania, Bulgaria and Poland. Moscow, however, was alarmed at de Gaulle's suggestion that the Soviet satellites should show some independence of their own. When Czechoslovakia did show signs of independence, Moscow and its client states invaded and crushed the new government there in 1968. Détente was dead as were de Gaulle's grandiose plans.

=== Nigerian Civil War ===
The Eastern Region of Nigeria declared itself independent under the name of the Independent Republic of Biafra on 30 May 1967. On 6 July, the first shots in the Nigerian Civil War were fired, marking the start of a conflict that lasted until January 1970. Britain provided military aid to the Federal Republic of Nigeria—yet more was made available by the Soviet Union. Under de Gaulle's leadership, France embarked on a period of interference outside the traditional French zone of influence. A policy geared toward the break-up of Nigeria put Britain and France into opposing camps. Relations between France and Nigeria had been under strain since the third French nuclear explosion in the Sahara in December 1960. From August 1968, when its embargo was lifted, France provided limited and covert support to the Biafra rebels. Although French arms helped to keep Biafra in action for the final 15 months of the civil war, its involvement was seen as insufficient and counterproductive. The Biafran chief of staff stated that the French "did more harm than good by raising false hopes and by providing the British with an excuse to reinforce Nigeria."

=== Poland ===
General de Gaulle paid an official visit to Poland on 6 September 1967 and spent an entire week there. De Gaulle described it as his "pilgrimage to Poland" and visited Warsaw, Gdańsk, Kraków and Nazi death camp Auschwitz-Birkenau. He met with crowds of people on the streets and shouted (in Polish) "Long live Poland! Our dear, noble and brave Poland!".

=== Recognition of the People's Republic of China ===
In January 1964, France was, after the UK, among the first of the major Western powers to open diplomatic relations with the People's Republic of China (PRC), which was established in 1949 and which was isolated on the international scene. By recognizing Mao Zedong's government, de Gaulle signaled to both Washington and Moscow that France intended to deploy an independent foreign policy. The move was criticized in the United States as it seemed to seriously damage US policy of containment in Asia. De Gaulle justified this action by "the weight of evidence and reason", considering that China's demographic weight and geographic extent put it in a position to have a global leading role. De Gaulle also used this opportunity to arouse rivalry between the USSR and China, a policy that was followed several years later by Henry Kissinger's "triangular diplomacy" which also aimed to create a Sino-Soviet split.

France established diplomatic relations with the People's Republic of China – the first step towards formal recognition without first severing links with the Republic of China (Taiwan), led by Chiang Kai-shek. Hitherto the PRC had insisted that all nations abide by a "one China" condition, and at first it was unclear how the matter would be settled. However, the agreement to exchange ambassadors was subject to a delay of three months, and in February, Chiang Kai-shek resolved the problem by cutting off diplomatic relations with France. Eight years later, US President Richard Nixon visited the PRC and began normalising relations—a policy which was confirmed in the Shanghai Communiqué of 28 February 1972.

=== Six-Day War ===
With tension rising in the Middle East in 1967, de Gaulle on 2 June declared an arms embargo against Israel, just three days before the outbreak of the Six-Day War. This, however, did not affect spare parts for the French military hardware with which the Israeli armed forces were equipped.

This was an abrupt change in French policy. In 1956, France, Britain and Israel had cooperated in an elaborate effort to retake the Suez Canal from Egypt. Israel's air force operated French Mirage and Mystère jets in the Six-Day War, and its navy was building its new missile boats in Cherbourg. Though paid for, their transfer to Israel was now blocked by de Gaulle's government. But they were smuggled out in an operation that drew further denunciations from the French government. The last boats took to the sea in December 1969, directly after a major deal between France and now-independent Algeria exchanging French armaments for Algerian oil.

Under de Gaulle, following the independence of Algeria, France embarked on foreign policy more favorable to the Arab side. President de Gaulle's position in 1967 at the time of the Six-Day War played a part in France's new-found popularity in the Arab world. Israel turned towards the United States for arms, and toward its own industry. In a televised news conference on 27 November 1967, de Gaulle described the Jewish people as "this elite people, sure of themselves and domineering".

In his letter to David Ben-Gurion dated 9 January 1968, he explained that he was convinced that Israel had ignored his warnings and overstepped the bounds of moderation by taking possession of Jerusalem, and Jordanian, Egyptian, and Syrian territory by force of arms. He felt Israel had exercised repression and expulsions during the occupation and that it amounted to annexation. He said that provided Israel withdrew its forces, it appeared that it might be possible to reach a solution through the UN framework which could include assurances of a dignified and fair future for refugees and minorities in the Middle East, recognition from Israel's neighbours, and freedom of navigation through the Gulf of Aqaba and the Suez Canal.

=== United States ===
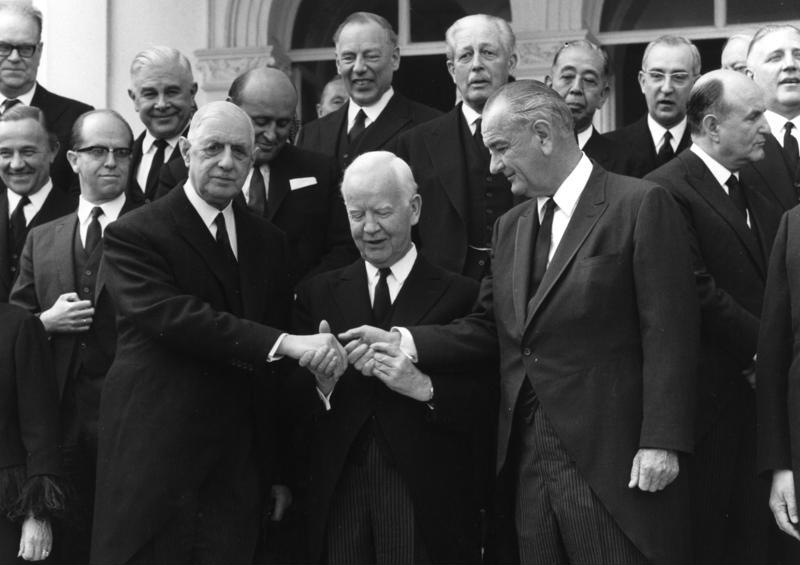
De Gaulle and Lyndon B. Johnson meeting at Konrad Adenauer's funeral in 1967, with President of West Germany Heinrich Lübke (center)

Although de Gaulle initially enjoyed good relations with US President John F. Kennedy, who admired his stance against the Soviet Union—particularly when the Berlin Wall was being built—and who called him "a great captain of the Western world", their relationship later cooled. He was Kennedy's most loyal ally during the Cuban Missile Crisis and supported the right that the US claimed to defend its interests in the western hemisphere, in contrast to German Chancellor Konrad Adenauer who doubted Kennedy's commitment to Europe and thought the crisis could have been avoided. De Gaulle accepted that it might be necessary for the United States to take preemptive military action against Cuba, unlike many other European leaders of his time. De Gaulle was a prominent figure at the state funerals of two American presidents: Kennedy and Dwight Eisenhower (Eisenhower's funeral was his only visit to the U.S. since the funeral of JFK).

Lt. General Vernon A. Walters, a military attaché of Dwight Eisenhower and later military attaché in France from 1967 to 1973, noted the strong relationship between de Gaulle and Eisenhower, de Gaulle's unconditional support of Eisenhower during the U-2 incident, and de Gaulle's strong support of John F. Kennedy during the Cuban Missile Crisis. Thus, Walters was intensely curious as to the great contrast between de Gaulle's close relations with two United States presidents during notable Cold War crises and de Gaulle's later decision to withdraw France from NATO's military command, and Walters spoke with many close military and political aides of de Gaulle.

Walters' conclusion, based upon de Gaulle's comments to many of his aides (and to Eisenhower during a meeting at Ramboullet Castle in 1959), is that de Gaulle feared that later United States presidents after Eisenhower would not have Eisenhower's special ties to Europe and would not risk nuclear war over Europe. Also, de Gaulle interpreted the peaceful resolution of the Cuban Missile Crisis without fighting to take back Cuba from communism a mere 90 miles from the United States as an indication that the United States might not fight for Europe's defense 3,500 miles away following Soviet aggression in Europe, but would only go to war following a nuclear strike against the United States itself. De Gaulle told Eisenhower that France did not seek to compete with the Strategic Air Command or army of the United States, but believed that France needed a way to strike the Soviet Union.

As part of a European tour, Nixon visited France in 1969. He and de Gaulle both shared the same non-Wilsonian approach to world affairs, believing in nations and their relative strengths, rather than in ideologies, international organisations, or multilateral agreements. De Gaulle is famously known for calling the UN the pejorative le Machin ("the thingamajig").

==== Phnom Penh speech ====
In September 1966, in a famous speech in Phnom Penh in Cambodia, he expressed France's disapproval of the US involvement in the Vietnam War, calling for a US withdrawal from Vietnam as the only way to ensure peace. De Gaulle considered the war to be the "greatest absurdity of the twentieth century". De Gaulle conversed frequently with George Ball, United States President Lyndon Johnson's Under Secretary of State, and told Ball that he feared that the United States risked repeating France's tragic experience in Vietnam, which de Gaulle called "ce pays pourri" ("the rotten country"). Ball later sent a 76-page memorandum to Johnson critiquing Johnson's Vietnam policy in October 1964.

==== US dollar crisis ====
In the Bretton Woods system put in place in 1944, US dollars were convertible to gold. In France, it was called "America's exorbitant privilege" as it resulted in an "asymmetric financial system" where foreigners "see themselves supporting American living standards and subsidizing American multinationals". As American economist Barry Eichengreen summarized: "It costs only a few cents for the Bureau of Engraving and Printing to produce a $100 bill, but other countries had to pony up $100 of actual goods in order to obtain one". In February 1965, President Charles de Gaulle announced his intention to exchange its US dollar reserves for gold at the official exchange rate. He sent the French Navy across the Atlantic to pick up the French reserve of gold, which had been moved there during World War II, and was followed by several countries. As it resulted in considerably reducing US gold stock and US economic influence, it led US President Richard Nixon to unilaterally end the convertibility of the dollar to gold on 15 August 1971 (the "Nixon Shock"). This was meant to be a temporary measure, but the dollar became permanently a floating fiat money and in October 1976, the US government officially changed the definition of the dollar as references to gold were removed from statutes.

=== Vive le Québec libre! ===
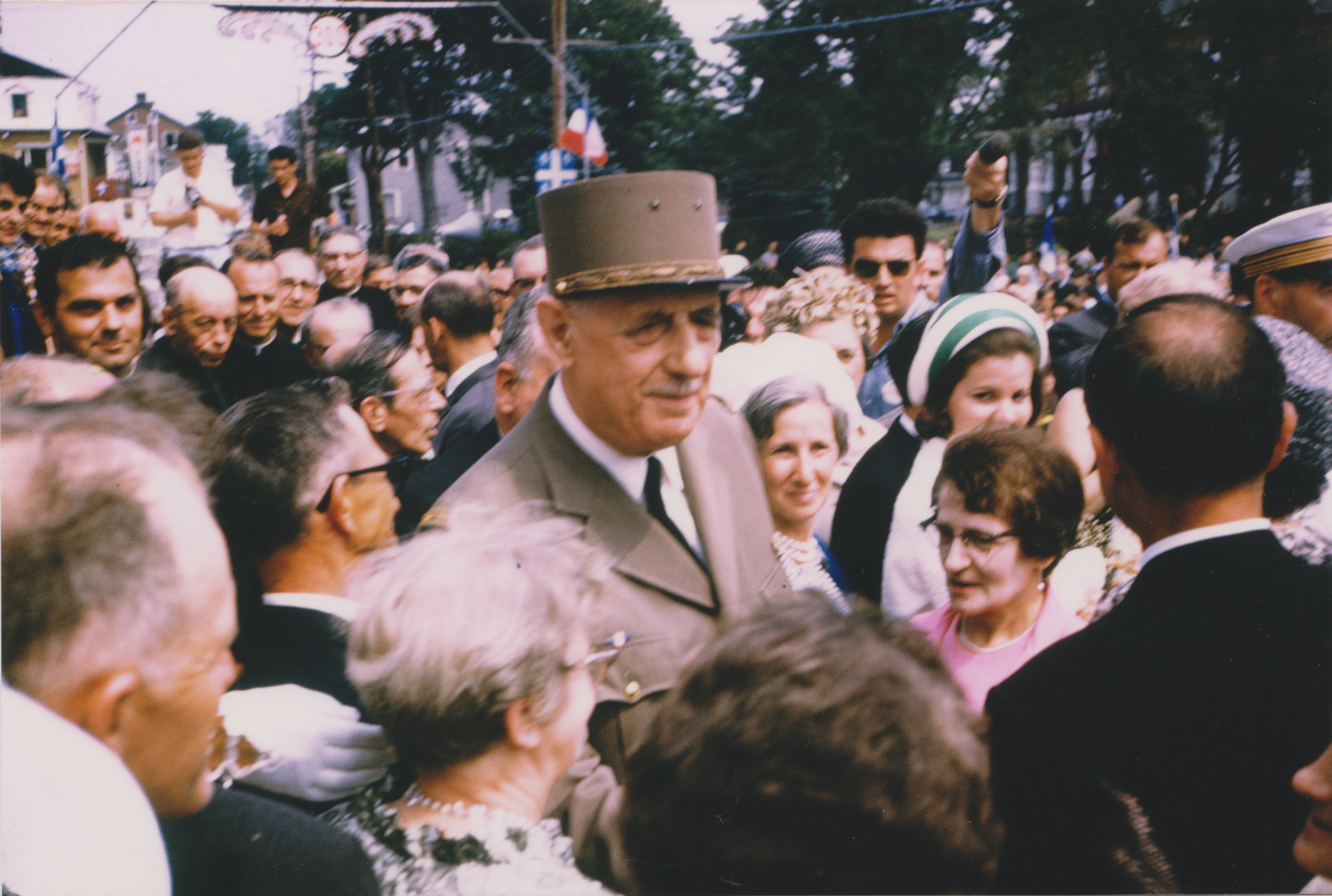
General Charles de Gaulle on the Chemin du Roy, Sainte-Anne-de-la-Pérade, 1967

In July 1967, de Gaulle visited Canada, which was celebrating its centenary with a world fair in Montreal, Expo 67. On 24 July, speaking to a large crowd from a balcony at Montreal's city hall, de Gaulle shouted "Vive le Québec libre! Vive le Canada français! Et vive la France!" (Long live free Quebec! Long live French Canada, and long live France!). The Canadian media harshly criticized the statement, and the Prime Minister of Canada, Lester B. Pearson, stated that "Canadians do not need to be liberated". De Gaulle left Canada abruptly two days later, without proceeding to Ottawa as scheduled. He never returned to Canada. The speech offended many English-speaking Canadians and was heavily criticized in France as well, and led to a significant diplomatic rift between the two countries.

The event however was seen as a watershed moment by the Quebec sovereignty movement, and is still a significant milestone of Quebec's history to the eyes of most Quebecers.

In the following year, de Gaulle visited Brittany, where he declaimed a poem written by his uncle (also called Charles de Gaulle) in the Breton language. The speech followed a series of crackdowns on Breton nationalism. De Gaulle was accused of hypocrisy, on the one hand supporting a "free" Quebec because of linguistic and ethnic differences from other Canadians, while on the other hand suppressing a regional and ethnic nationalist movement in Brittany.

=== Zaire ===
As what was then the second most populous French-speaking country in the world, and the most populous one in sub-Saharan Africa, Zaire was of great strategic interest to France. During the Congo's First Republic era, France tended to side with the conservative and federalist forces, as opposed to unitarists such as Lumumba. Shortly after the Katangan secession was successfully crushed, Zaire (then called the Republic of the Congo) signed a treaty of technical and cultural cooperation with France. During the presidency of Charles de Gaulle, diplomatic relations between the two countries gradually grew stronger and closer due to their many shared geopolitical interests.

== Evaluations ==
French scholar Alfred Grosser has evaluated the strengths and weaknesses of de Gaulle's foreign policy. On the positive side, the highest praise goes to a restoration of French grandeur in rank in world affairs, a return to a historic ranking. The French themselves are especially pleased with this development. As Foreign Minister Maurice Couve de Murville told the National Assembly in 1964: France has resumed her position in all sectors of world affairs." There is little dissent with this conclusion inside France, even from de Gaulle's old enemies. However, the rest of the world looks at the claim with some amusement, as de Gaulle has not restored the diplomatic reputation of Paris in Washington, London, or Moscow nor in Beijing, New Delhi, Tokyo, Bonn and Rome. West Germany remained much more closely aligned with the United States in major world affairs, especially regarding NATO. When Soviet control of Eastern Europe collapsed in 1989, the United States led the effort to reunite Germany, despite serious French doubts. Secondly, France did establish its independence of the Anglo-Saxon powers – especially the United States, and also Great Britain. De Gaulle's anti-American rhetoric did indeed rub Americans the wrong way, and give some encouragement to intellectuals hostile to Americanism. His pulling the French military out of NATO was basically a symbolic action, with few practical results. It did mean that NATO headquarters was relocated to Belgium, with the result that French generals gave up their voice in NATO policy. Most historians conclude that NATO grew stronger, and de Gaulle had failed to weaken it or lessen American dominance.

As long as de Gaulle was in power, he successfully blocked British entry into the European Union. When he retired, so too was that exclusionary policy. Grosser concludes that the enormous French effort to become independent of Washington in nuclear policy by building its own "force de frappe" has been a failure. The high budget cost came at the expense of weakening France's conventional military capabilities. Neither Washington nor Moscow paid much attention to the French nuclear deterrent one way or another. As a neutral force in world affairs, France does have considerable influence over its former colonies, much more than any other ex-colonial power. But the countries involved are not powerhouses, and the major neutral nations at the time, such as India, Yugoslavia and Indonesia, paid little attention to Paris. He did not have a major influence at the United Nations. While the French people supported and admired the foreign policy of Charles de Gaulle at the time and in retrospect, he made it all himself with scant regard to French public or elite opinion.

== See also ==
- Foreign relations of France
- History of French foreign relations

== Notes ==
=== Bibliography ===
- Berthon, Simon. Allies at War: The Bitter Rivalry among Churchill, Roosevelt, and de Gaulle. (2001). 356 pp. online
- Fenby, Jonathan. The General: Charles De Gaulle and the France He Saved (2011), popular biography online
- Grosser, Alfred. French foreign policy under De Gaulle (1977)
- Jackson, Julian. Charles de Gaulle (2003), 172pp
- Jackson, Julian. A Certain Idea of France: The Life of Charles de Gaulle (2018) 887pp; the most recent major biography.
- Johnson, Douglas. "De Gaulle and France's Role in the World." in Hugh Gough and John Horne, eds. De Gaulle and Twentieth Century France (1994): 83–94.
- Kolodziej, Edward A. French International Policy under de Gaulle and Pompidou: The Politics of Grandeur (1974)
- Kulski, Władysław Wszebór (1966). De Gaulle and the World: The Foreign Policy of the Fifth French Republic. Syracuse UP. ISBN 978-0815600527.
- Lacouture, Jean. De Gaulle: The Ruler 1945–1970 (v 2 1993), 700 pp, a major scholarly biography. online
- Martin, Garret. "The 1967 withdrawal from NATO–a cornerstone of de Gaulle's grand strategy?." Journal of Transatlantic Studies 9.3 (2011): 232–243.
- Nuenlist, Christian et al. eds. Globalizing de Gaulle: International Perspectives on French Foreign Policies, 1958–1969 (2010).
- Paxton, Robert O. and Wahl, Nicholas, eds. De Gaulle and the United States: A Centennial Reassessment. (1994). 433 pp.
- Williams, Andrew. "Charles de Gaulle: The Warrior as Statesman." Global Society 32.2 (2018): 162- [ online] 175+. excerpt
- Woodward, Sir Llewellyn. British Foreign Policy in the Second World War (1962).
