= List of international presidential trips made by Charles de Gaulle =

This is a list of international presidential trips made by Charles de Gaulle. He served as the President of France from 1959 to 1969, and became infamous for making inflammatory remarks that often violated diplomatic protocol. Throughout his presidency, he made state visits to twenty-six countries.

== Summary of official trips ==
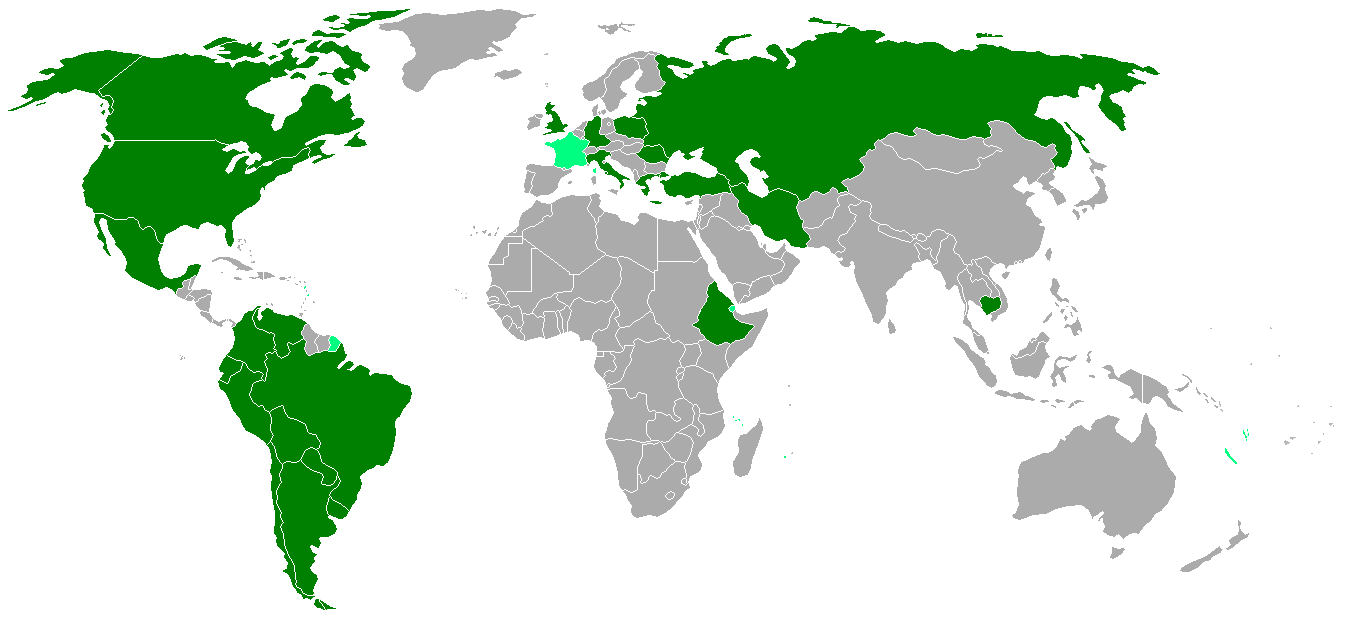
Countries visited by Charles de Gaulle as president

Date(s)	Country	Details	Ref.
23-29 June 1959	Italy; Vatican City	Met with Rome mayor Urbano Cioccetti and Pope John XXIII.	
5-8 April 1960	United Kingdom	Met with Queen Elizabeth II and gave her the French Order of Liberation awarded to her father George VI.	
18–29 April 1960	Canada United States	Visited Ottawa, Quebec City, Montreal, and Toronto before visiting Washington D.C., where he met with President Dwight D. Eisenhower and Vice President Richard Nixon. He then visited San Francisco and finally New Orleans.	
23–24 October 1960	Monaco	Met with Prince Rainier III. This would be the last state visit to Monaco by a French president for 24 years.	
20 May 1961	West Germany	Met with Chancellor Konrad Adenauer in Bonn.	
24–26 November 1961	United Kingdom	Met with Prime Minister Harold Macmillan.	
4–9 September 1962	West Germany	Met with Chancellor Konrad Adenauer in Cologne and Bonn.	
16–20 May 1963	Greece	Met with King Paul and visited Athens.	
4–5 July 1963	West Germany	First visit after the signing of the Élysée Treaty in Paris six months prior.	
16–20 October 1963	Iran	Met with the Shah of Iran and his wife. Visited Tehran, Isfahan, and the ruins of Persepolis.	
15–24 March 1964	Mexico	Met with President Adolfo López Mateos, and gave a speech to a crowd of more than 300,000 people. See more.	
3–4 July 1964	West Germany	Met Chancellor Ludwig Erhard in Bonn.	
21 September – 16 October 1964	Venezuela, Colombia, Ecuador, Peru, Bolivia, Chile, Argentina, Paraguay, Uruguay, Brazil	See: Charles de Gaulle's trip to South America.	
30 January 1965	United Kingdom	Attended the state funeral of Winston Churchill.	
20 June – 1 July 1966	Soviet Union	Visited Moscow, Novosibirsk, Kiev, Leningrad, Volgograd, and the Baikonur Cosmodrome in Baikonur. Also signed the French-Soviet Joint Declaration of June 30, 1966.	
26 August – 27 August 1966	(Ethiopian Empire) Ethiopia	Visited Addis Ababa and met with the Ethiopian emperor Haile Selassie.	
30 August – 2 September 1966	Cambodia	Visited Phnom Penh and denounced American military intervention in Southeast Asia. See: Phnom Penh speech	
12–13 July 1967	West Germany	Met with Chancellor Kurt Georg Kiesinger in Bonn.	
24–27 July 1967	Canada	Visited Montreal for the Expo 1967. The visit became infamous after he yelled "Vive le Québec libre" to a crowd of Quebec separatists.	
6–12 September 1967	Poland	Visited Warsaw, Gdańsk, and the Auschwitz concentration camp.	
14–19 May 1968	Romania	Met with Romanian leader Nicolae Ceaușescu.	
27–28 September 1968	West Germany	Met with Chancellor Kurt Georg Kiesinger in Bonn. He had previously been to Germany in May after fleeing France because of the May 68 protests, but it was not a state visit.	
25–31 October 1968	Turkey	Visited Ankara. This was his last international trip as president.	

== See also ==
- Presidency of Charles de Gaulle
- Foreign policy of Charles de Gaulle
