= State visits by Charles de Gaulle to South America =

Map of Charles De Gaulle's trip to South America in 1964.

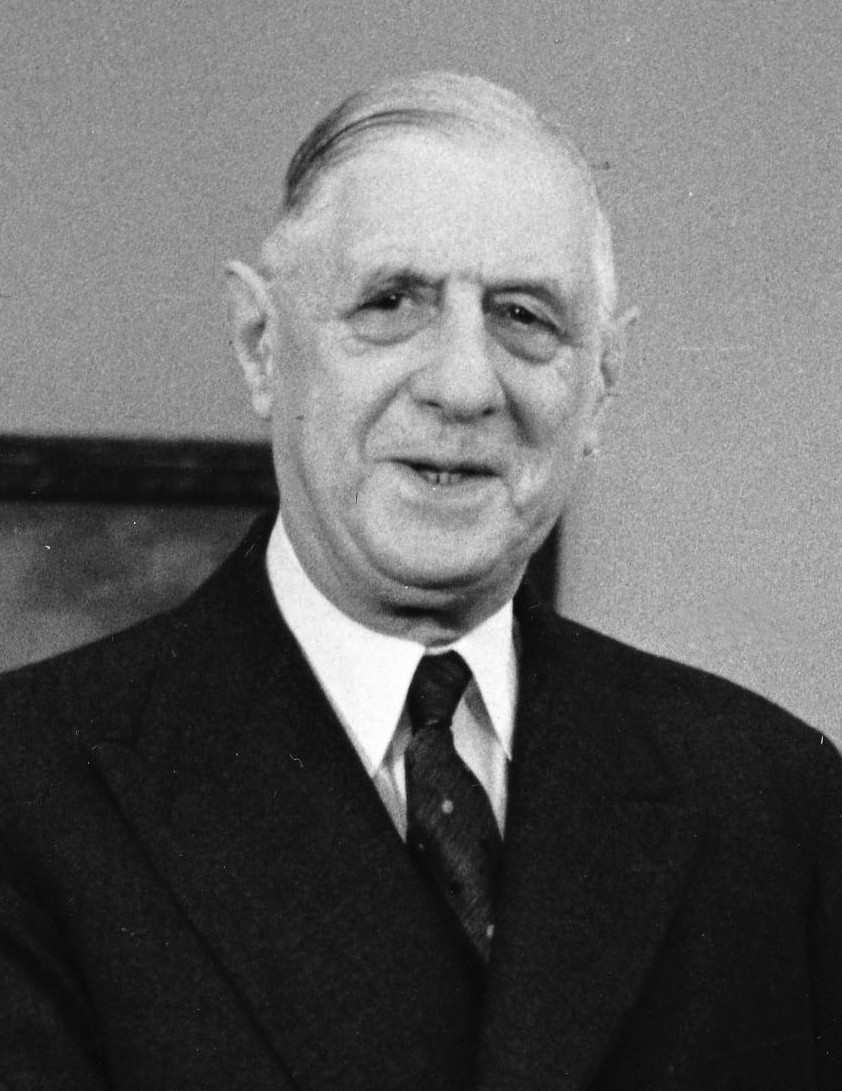
Charles de Gaulle, pictured here in 1963, intended to turn the page on the colonial empire after Algeria's independence in 1962, and to strengthen French cooperation abroad, particularly in South America.

The French president Charles de Gaulle made a series of state visits to South American countries between September 21 and October 16, 1964. During this trip of three weeks and 32,000 km, (Note: According to other sources, 35,000km.) the longest made by Charles de Gaulle, he visited Venezuela, Colombia, Ecuador, Peru, Bolivia, Chile, Argentina, Paraguay, Uruguay and Brazil.

This trip was motivated by the French president's desire to turn the page on decolonization after the end of the Algerian War in 1962 and to continue his "policy of grandeur" by emphasizing cooperation, in particular by strengthening ties between France and Latin America. The operation was the subject of meticulous preparation by the Quai d'Orsay and the French embassies of the countries concerned. The trip was preceded by a visit to Mexico, from March 16 to 19, 1964, during which de Gaulle launched his famous "Marchemos la mano en la mano". De Gaulle, accompanied by a French delegation, transited from one country to another in a Caravelle. On two occasions, he also traveled aboard the cruiser Colbert.

The visit of the French head of state aroused real enthusiasm in the countries he passed through. The "man of June 18" was preceded by his aura as leader of Free France. He knew how to win the favor of crowds, particularly through his speeches in Spanish. However, several of the themes he developed in his speeches were not well received by certain powers in place, notably his criticism of the United States hyperpower. The results of the trip were ultimately mixed. In terms of communication, it was a great success but not followed by many concrete translations. Indeed, France remained a minor economic player in South America and the position of the United States in the region has not been shaken.

== Context ==
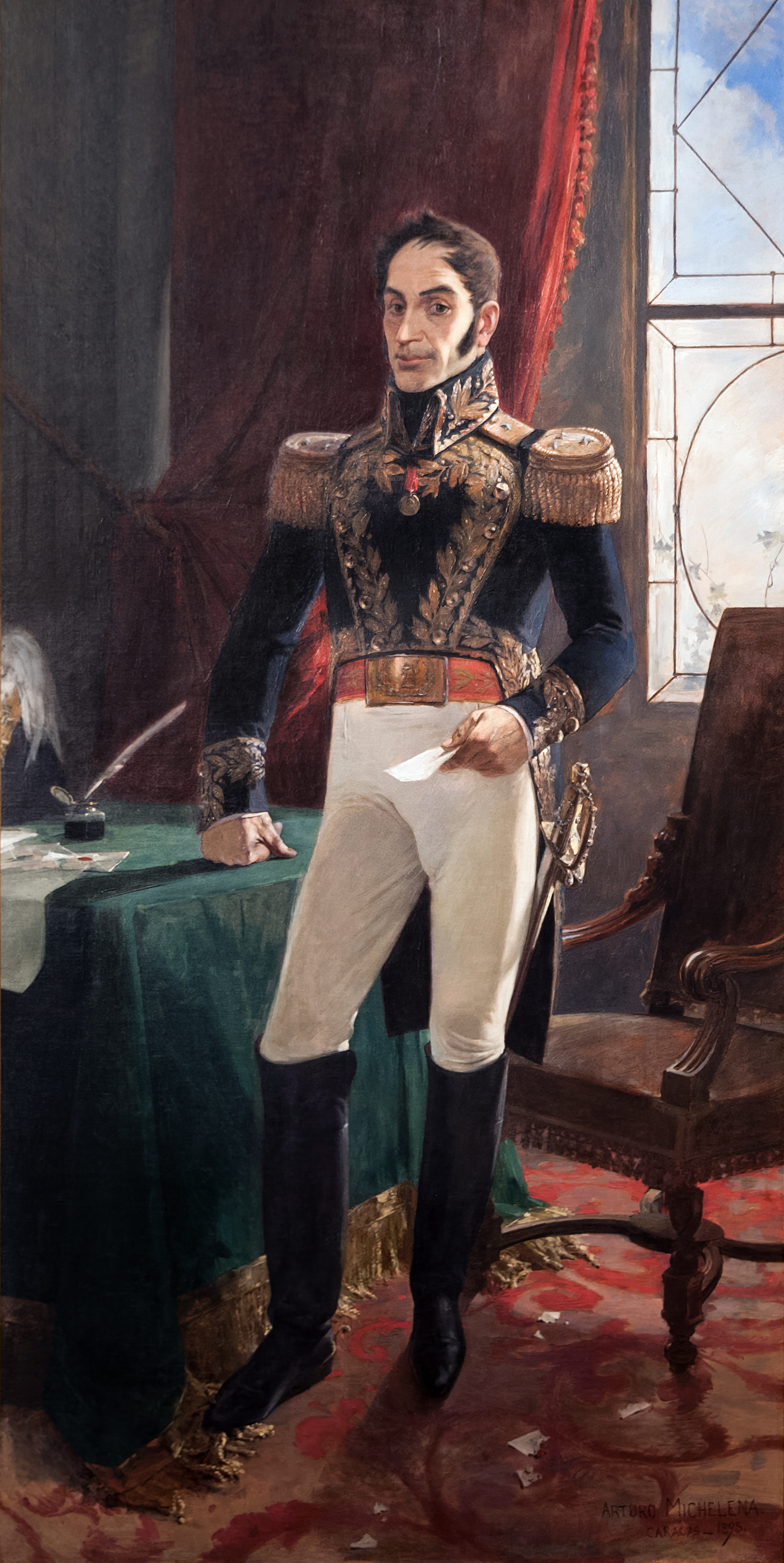
Simón Bolívar, the emblematic figure of the Spanish-American wars of independence, spent time in Paris, where he came into direct contact with the ideas of the Enlightenment and the legacy of the Revolution. De Gaulle, "the man of June 18", "El Libertador", as he was also known during his trip, quoted Bolívar extensively in his speeches.

France historically enjoys significant prestige in South America. The great figures of the Spanish-American wars of independence, Bolívar (who attended the coronation of Napoleon at Notre-Dame de Paris in 1804), Sucre, Miranda, Artigas and San Martín were greatly influenced by the Lumières and the French Revolution. When World War II broke out, the South American elites experienced the French defeat as a real tragedy. Nearly 300 of the 400 support committees for Free France existing in the world were created in Latin America, under the leadership of Jacques Soustelle. Several intellectuals, Georges Bernanos, Roger Caillois and Jules Supervielle found refuge in this region of the world. In the post-war period, the Latin Union, founded in 1954 and based in Paris, served to strengthen cultural ties, as did the Institute of Advanced Latin American Studies (IHEAL) created in 1956. South American elites frequently come to complete their education in France; this is the case of Oscar Niemeyer, the architect of Brasília, or even of Belaunde Terry and Castelo Branco, respectively heads of state of Peru and Brazil, whom de Gaulle met during his diplomatic tour.

By 1964, France had essentially completed its decolonization, which improved its diplomatic position in Latin America where anticolonial sentiment was powerful. De Gaulle therefore intended to open a new era of cooperation, not only with the former French colonies, but throughout the world. It was with this in mind that he established, on January 27, 1964, the diplomatic relations with the People's Republic of China. He said in a press conference, on January 31, 1964, its objectives in South America:

"The enterprise goes beyond the African framework and constitutes in truth a world policy. By this means, France can move towards other countries which, in other continents, are more or less largely in the process of development, which attract us instinctively and naturally and which, wishing for their development a support which is lent to them according to our spirit and our manner, may wish to associate us directly with their progress and, reciprocally, take part in all that is French. [...] This is what we intend to discuss shortly with Mr. Lopez Mateos, President of Mexico, and later no doubt with the governments of the South American States on the occasion of the trips which I hope to have the honor of making there"

The October 1962 Cuban Missile Crisis was still recent at the time of the French visit, and the anti-American sentiment was strong in South America. On the economic front, the United States launched the Alliance for Progress in 1961; an ambitious development aid program for Latin America. They also did not hesitate to intervene to support regimes that could help them in their strategy of containing communism. This is how they supported, in March 1964, the Brazilian military coup of Marshal Castelo Branco. While de Gaulle supported the North American allies during the missile crisis, he refused to cut diplomatic relations with Cuba or support the embargo of the island. In this context, he is appreciated in South America for his displayed independence from the Americans and is particularly popular in anti-American environments.

== Mexican prelude ==
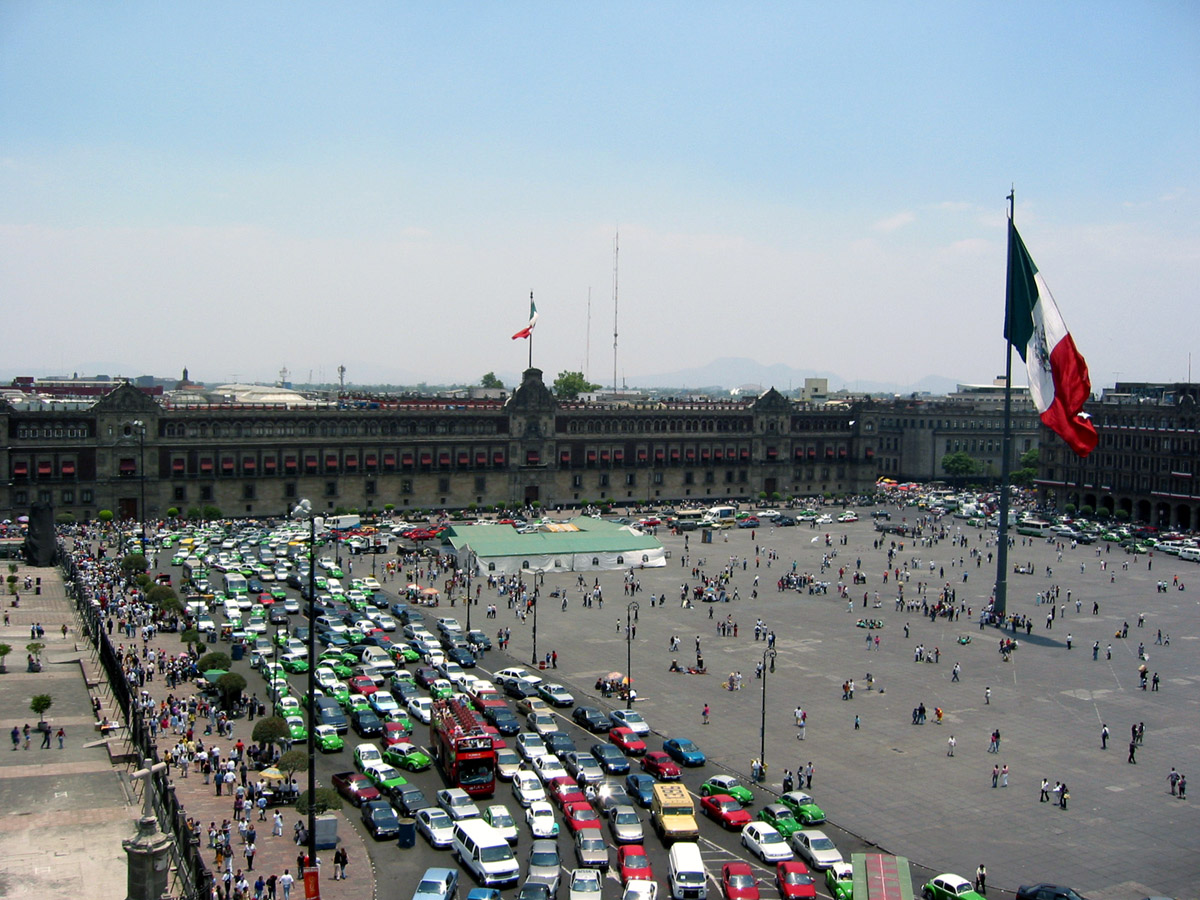
From the balconies of Mexico City's National Palace, de Gaulle shouted “Marchemos la mano en la mano!” to a crowd of 300,000 Mexicans gathered on the Zócalo, the Independence Square.

From March 16 to 19, 1964, de Gaulle visited Mexico at the invitation of Mexican President Adolfo Lopez Mateos. In advance of the visit, the French ambassador returned to Mexico three flags taken by Maximilian from Juárez's troops during the battles of San Lorenzo, San Pablo del Monte and Valparaíso in 1863-1864 during the Mexican Expedition. The trip was announced in a roundabout way on March 5 by ORTF in the program Bonne nuit les petits. Nounours announced his imminent departure for Mexico and said a few words in Spanish.

De Gaulle arrived in Mexico on March 16 aboard his Boeing 707 via Pointe-à-Pitre, with a short stopover in Mérida before arriving in Mexico City aboard his Caravelle. He made a point of presenting himself to the Mexican authorities in a French aircraft, a gesture he repeated on all his trips to South America. In preparation for the event, two huge portraits of the Presidents were placed on the El Moro building, and the Central Workers' Union trucked in 250,000 workers to form an 8 km hedge from the airport to the center of the capital. Planes dropped thousands of leaflets over the Mexican capital, inviting the population to take part in the event. De Gaulle addressed the 300,000 Mexicans gathered on the Zócalo in Spanish from the balcony of the National Palace - the only foreign leader ever to do so. He concluded his speech with a phrase that has gone down in history:

"He aquí, pues, lo que el pueblo francés propone al pueblo mexicano: marchemos la mano en la mano."
"So here's what the French people are proposing to the Mexican people: Let's walk hand in hand!"

The speech did not elicit an enthusiastic response at the time. On the other hand, his visit to the University of Mexico on March 18 provoked a furore among the public; crowds were so large his car could not continue, and he was "literally carried by clusters of students shouting his name".

== Preparations ==
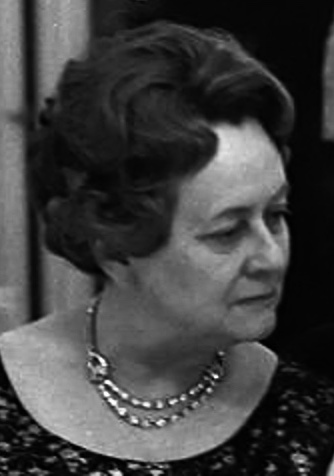
Yvonne de Gaulle accompanied her husband on his trip to South America. Foreign travel was said to be the only aspect of her role as First Lady that she enjoyed. A specific program of visits was planned for her. Whenever possible, she visited centers for handicapped children. Her shyness made her a difficult guest to welcome.

The trip to South America was meticulously prepared in advance by the Élysée protocol department and the Ministry of Foreign Affairs. On June 3, 1964, de Gaulle called a meeting of his Foreign Minister Couve de Murville, the Quai d'Orsay Chief of Protocol, Étienne Burin des Roziers, Secretary General of the Élysée Palace, and the ten French ambassadors of the countries he would be visiting. The aim is to outline the forthcoming trip and coordinate liaison between the various embassies. The task was difficult, as many parameters had to be reconciled: the length of visits to each country, transport, protocol, security, accommodation, choice of interpreters and Yvonne de Gaulle's specific program. Particular attention was paid to climate and altitude. It was decided to opt for the month of September to avoid extreme heat. To avoid high altitude differentials, de Gaulle was scheduled to fly from Bogotá (2,640 m) to Quito (2,850 m) and then on to Cochabamba (2,570 m) in Bolivia. Because it was too high, Bolivia's capital, La Paz (3,600 m), was dropped from the schedule. In fact, de Gaulle passed through Lima, the Peruvian capital at sea level, before heading for Bolivia.

Diplomat Gilbert Pérol, Director of Protocol and Press Office, made a scouting trip in June-July 1964. He provided de Gaulle with a preparatory dossier of over 1,000 pages, a 100-page binder for each country. Each member of the various governments was the subject of a biography. The schedule for the visit was defined down to the minute, along with details of protocol. To help prepare the President's speeches, diplomatic posts in South America send Foreign Affairs lists of quotations from Latin American figures. Particular attention is also paid to ensuring that these speeches were translated by a native speaker of the country where they were to be delivered, rather than by a Quai d'Orsay interpreter.

== Presidential suite and material aspects of the trip ==
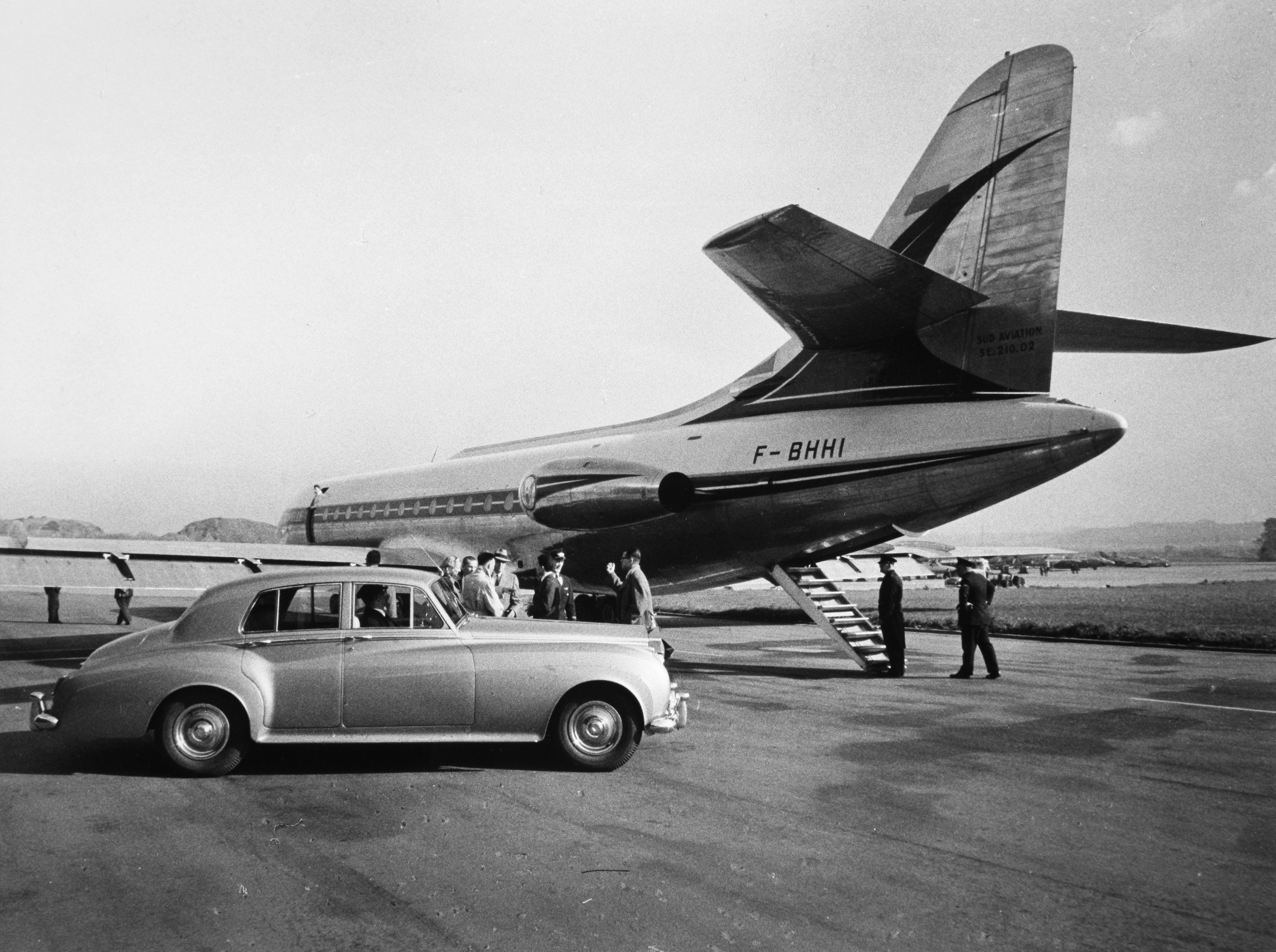
De Gaulle mainly flew the stages of his South American tour aboard his Caravelle presidential aircraft.

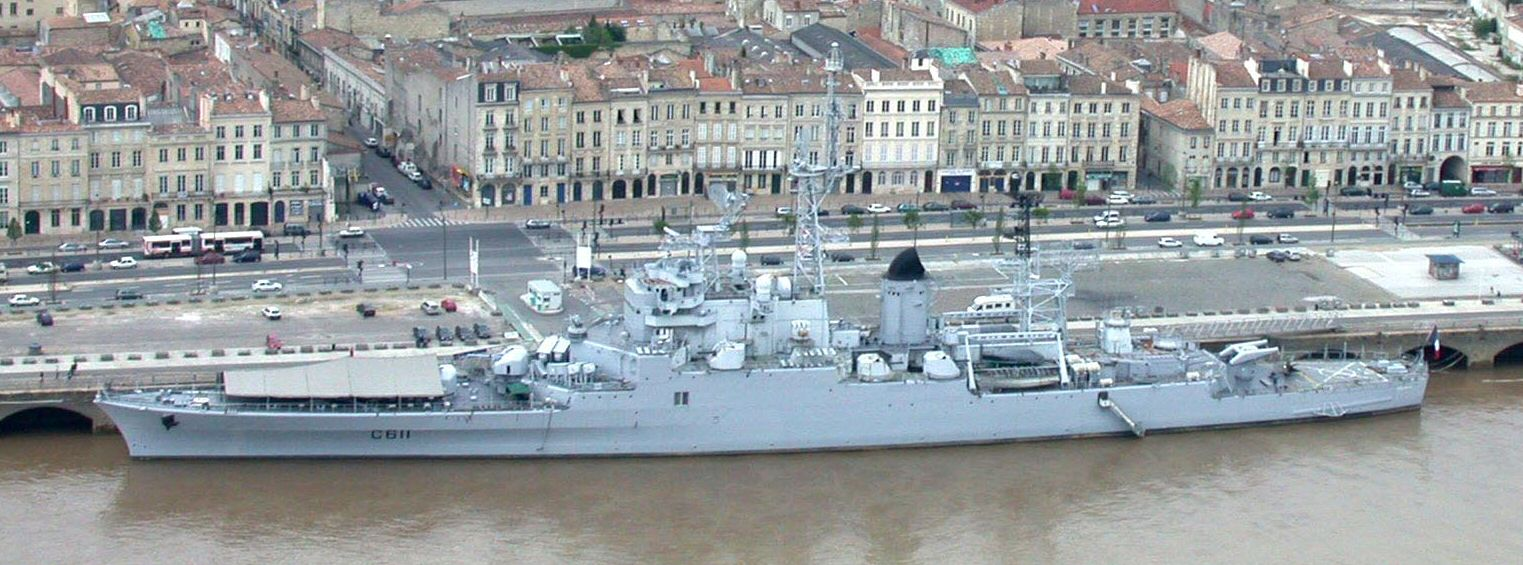
Between Arica and Valparaiso in Chile, then between the Uruguayan capital and Rio de Janeiro in Brazil, the French president sailed on the cruiser Colbert. Legally considered French territory, he could sign laws and decrees on board.

De Gaulle insisted on arriving in the countries he visited aboard French aircraft. And so, while he crossed the Atlantic in a long-haul Boeing 707, he transited via Pointe-à-Pitre in Guadeloupe so as to arrive in South America in his presidential Caravelle. This twin-engine short- and medium-haul aircraft, produced by the French company Sud-Aviation, was specially fitted out for the trip. An emergency Caravelle, containing luggage and spare parts, followed the first. De Gaulle also sailed aboard the cruiser Colbert between Arica and Valparaiso in Chile, then from the Uruguayan capital Montevideo to Rio de Janeiro in Brazil. As the ship was legally considered French territory, the President could sign laws and decrees there.

De Gaulle traveled with his wife, Yvonne. The presidential suite comprises 37 people, several of whom are in charge of protocol, including two aides-de-camp and two interpreters. Four bodyguards providing close protection for the President were also on board, as was his personal physician. As the President had undergone prostate surgery between his trips to Mexico and South America, his state of health was closely monitored. Vice-Admiral Jean Philippon, the President's chief of staff, accompanied him, as did Georges Galichon, his chief of staff, who made the trip from Caracas to Argentina, while Étienne Burin des Roziers, Secretary General of the Presidency, relayed him from Buenos Aires to Paris. Maurice Couve de Murville, Minister of Foreign Affairs, was the only member of the government to accompany de Gaulle. For his trip to America, de Gaulle surrounded himself exclusively with military and senior civil servants. No intellectuals or businessmen accompanied him.

Great attention was paid to the French President's security. This concern was part of a dual context. The assassination of President Kennedy in Dallas on November 22, 1963 was one factor. In addition, the OAS attempted to shoot de Gaulle on several occasions - at Pont-sur-Seine in 1961, at Petit-Clamart in 1963, and again on August 14, 1964, shortly before the trip, at Mont Faron near Toulon - at a time when several OAS members had taken refuge in South America. The Colombian General Staff reported the presence of Château-Jobert in South America; General Gardy and several of his relatives were based in Argentina. The President's security was provided by the inviting countries, but they agreed that his close security would be managed by his four bodyguards and the two Élysée officials accompanying de Gaulle. Lists of activists opposed to de Gaulle were drawn up and sent to the South American countries. Most of them, such as Georges Bidault in Brazil, aware of the generous right of asylum they had been granted, did not wish to jeopardize their situation by carrying out actions hostile to de Gaulle. Nevertheless, important precautions were taken in a continent where pronunciamentos were commonplace, and where political opposition - communist guerrillas or Peronism in Argentina - was a danger. The press emphasized the impressive security arrangements put in place during the visits.

== Discursos ==
The agenda included a set of thirty-nine speeches, ten "short speeches", a dozen "toasts" and six public addresses.

As was his custom when traveling abroad, de Gaulle made a point of speaking the language of the country on his visits to South America. He used Spanish in two ways. Firstly, in his speeches to the local executive and legislative powers, he included quotations from Latin American figures passed on to him by French diplomatic missions. These included "Asunción, la muy noble y muy ilustre" (Asunción, the most noble and illustrious of cities) by Paraguayan poet Eloy Fariña Núñez, and "La conquista del Perú por los Peruanos" (The conquest of Peru by the Peruvians) by his Peruvian counterpart Fernando Belaúnde. But it's above all when he speaks directly to the local population that he uses Spanish, as a way of creating direct contact. He did so in seven of the countries he visited, but did not speak in Portuguese to the Brazilian population as originally planned. His speeches in Spanish have a number of points in common. They begin systematically enough with an exclamatory interpellation: "Peruvians!", "My Bolivian friends!", ending with "Long live Chile!", "Long live the Argentine Republic!". He shows his respect by saluting the country he represents: "Greetings to Ecuador on behalf of France", "With my voice, France salutes Argentina". He insists on France's closeness to the country he is visiting: "Bolivia, like France...", exploits the register of friendship, sometimes bordering on a declaration of love: "The France of peace and progress loves and esteems Peru", and underlines the value of his hosts, thus the Bolivians are "a proud, courageous, independent people". By emphasizing the use of Spanish in short speeches, simple words, emotion, flattery and repetition, de Gaulle succeeded in making a lasting impression and winning support.

Several themes recur in his speeches. De Gaulle spoke out against "hegemonies". By this term, he meant the two Cold War superpowers, the Soviet Union and the United States. However, the French president is careful never to mention them by name. This position on hegemonies is quite similar to that of exiled Argentine president Juan Perón on a third way, the "tercera posición", although de Gaulle never uses the term. The French president also recurrently used the concept of latinidad. In the General's mind, this refers to the common Latin and Christian civilizational roots linking Europe, and France in particular, to South America, with the United States implicitly excluded. Independence was another important theme in Gaullist speeches. He paid homage to the figures of the Spanish-American wars of independence, Bolívar, Sucre and San Martín. He drew a parallel between France's struggle to preserve its independence and that of Latin American countries, which he urged to continue their efforts. The question of cooperation, in line with his denunciation of hegemonies, was also a recurring theme. De Gaulle proposed cooperation and economic aid free from political pressure.

== Schedule of visits ==
De Gaulle stayed an average of one day in each country, except in Peru, Argentina and Brazil, where visits were longer. In each of the ten countries visited, the French President's programme was more or less similar. Arrival begins with a welcoming ceremony. One or two face-to-face meetings with the local head of state, or even with key members of the government, are scheduled. The heads of state exchange gifts and decorations. Wreath-laying ceremonies are organised, usually at the graves of South American national heroes. The French President addressed the legislature and then the university. Solemn dinners at the presidential palace with an exchange of toasts were scheduled. This was followed by a visit to the French embassy, the presentation of the heads of diplomatic missions, a meeting with the local French community and the handover of the keys to the city. He also took part in military parades, in Chile but especially in Paraguay, then under the rule of dictator Alfredo Stroessner. He also visited military establishments. These visits, to countries where the armed forces play a sometimes destabilising political role, were criticised, especially as he did not often pay tribute to the rule of law, visiting only four high courts.

Récapitulatif des visites
Country	Location	Dates	Cities visited (capitals are in bold)	Heads of state
Venezuela	Localisation du Venezuela sur une carte d'Amérique du Sud	21-22 September	**Caracas** (21-22 Sep.)	Raúl Leoni
Colombia	Localisation de la Colombie sur une carte d'Amérique du Sud	22-24 September	**Bogotá** (22-24 Sep.)	Guillermo León Valencia
Ecuador	Localisation de l'Équateur sur une carte d'Amérique du Sud	24-25 September	**Quito** (24-25 Sep.) Guayaquil (25 Sep.)	Castro Jijón, Cabrera Sevilla, Gandara Enriquez and Freile Pozzo (Ecuadorian Military Junta)
Peru	Localisation du Pérou sur une carte d'Amérique du Sud	25-28 September	**Lima** (25-28 Sep.)	Fernando Belaúnde Terry
Bolivia	Localisation de la Bolivie sur une carte d'Amérique du Sud	28-29 September	Cochabamba (28-29 Sep.)	Víctor Paz Estenssoro
Chile	Localisation du Chili sur une carte d'Amérique du Sud	29 September - 3 October (de Gaulle sails from 29 September to 2 October on the Colbert)	Arica (29 Sep.) Valparaíso (1 Oct.) **Santiago** (1-3 Oct.) Rancagua (2 Oct.)	Jorge Alessandri Rodríguez (current president) Eduardo Frei Montalva (elected president)
Argentina	Localisation de l'Argentine sur une carte d'Amérique du Sud	3-6 October	**Buenos Aires** (3-6 Oct.) Córdoba (6 Oct.)	Arturo Umberto Illia
Paraguay	Localisation du Paraguay sur une carte d'Amérique du Sud	6-8 October	**Asunción** (6-8 Oct.)	Alfredo Stroessner
Uruguay	Localisation de l'Uruguay sur une carte d'Amérique du Sud	8-10 October	**Montevideo** (8-10 Oct.) ·	Luis Giannattasio
Brazil	Localisation du Brésil sur une carte d'Amérique du Sud	13-16 October	Rio de Janeiro (13, 15-16 Oct.) **Brasília** (13-14 Oct.) São Paulo (14-15 oct.)	Humberto de Alencar Castelo Branco

== Venezuela ==
De Gaulle arrived in Venezuela from Pointe-à-Pitre in Guadeloupe, where he had boarded the Caravelle aircraft in which he made most of the stops on his journey. He landed on 21 September 1964 at Maiquetía airport, which serves the capital Caracas.

In response to the welcome address by Venezuelan President Raúl Leoni, he declared "For the first time in history, a French head of state is officially visiting South America". He then travelled in a motorcade in a convertible car to Caracas. There he addressed the members of the Congress of the Republic, evoking the figure of Francisco de Miranda, the precursor of the independence movements of the Spanish-speaking Americas, whose name is inscribed on the Arc de Triomphe de l'Étoile. He exchanged decorations with his Venezuelan counterpart, receiving the Order of the Liberator from him, and continued his journey to Colombia on the afternoon of 22 September.

== Colombia ==
On his arrival at El Dorado airport, which serves the Colombian capital Bogotá, de Gaulle and his entourage were greeted by the conservative Colombian President Guillermo León Valencia. The crowd waved banners reading "Down with the Americans". The following day, as de Gaulle's motorcade passed the La Salle University, students rushed towards his convertible car, chanting anti-American slogans. De Gaulle visited the Quinta de Bolívar and the Lycée Pasteur. Although he wanted to address the crowd directly in Spanish, the Colombian authorities refused, obstinately refusing on various pretextsn. (Note: The Colombian government gave various reasons for its refusal: "it was not clear from where or on what occasion General de Gaulle would speak to the crowd; he would have to be accompanied by President Valencia; Colombian customs did not favour a foreign head of state addressing the population directly.")

During the visit, a government wanted notice was published in the daily El Tiempo concerning Pierre Chateau-Jobert, an OAS leader who had supposedly taken refuge in the country. However, on 24 September, the security services published a new communiqué in which they concluded that the activist was not in the country.

During the official dinner at the San Carlos Palace, the Colombian President made a slip of the tongue, toasting Spain rather than France.

== Ecuador ==
The French protocol service was facing a problem in Ecuador. In every country, an exchange of decorations between Heads of State was scheduled. And the rule of protocol was that only a head of state could be awarded the Grand Cross of the Legion of Honour. However, in Ecuador a military junta has taken power. The four officers who made up the junta, Rear Admiral Ramón Castro Jijón, Generals Luis Cabrera Sevilla and Marcos Gandara Enriquez, and Air Force Colonel Guillermo Freile Pozzo, all wanted to receive the French decoration, which was finally accepted by their French interlocutors. In order to be concise, while respecting the equality of protocol, de Gaulle referred to the four strong men of the country as 'your eminent junta.

In Quito, the capital of Ecuador, de Gaulle spoke in Spanish for the first time during the trip. He spoke from the balcony of the Palacio de Carondelet to a crowd gathered in Independence Square.

"Francia trata de ayudar a los demás a avanzar por el camino de la civilización. Asimismo, el Ecuador y Francia tienen hoy, más que nunca, todo lo que se requiere para un mutuo entendimiento, para avenirse y para cooperar. ¡Viva El Ecuador!"
"France strives to help other peoples advance in civilisation. So, today more than ever, Ecuador and France have everything they need to understand each other, to get along and to cooperate. Long live Ecuador!"

Before leaving for Peru, a short stopover took the presidential suite to Guayaquil, the country's main port and economic capital, where he gave a final speech.

The presidential visit was an opportunity for Ecuadorian students to denounce the military junta. They published a play in Bogotá, then smuggled it to Quito, in which the junta's officers and their wives were mocked for the decorations affair.

== Peru ==
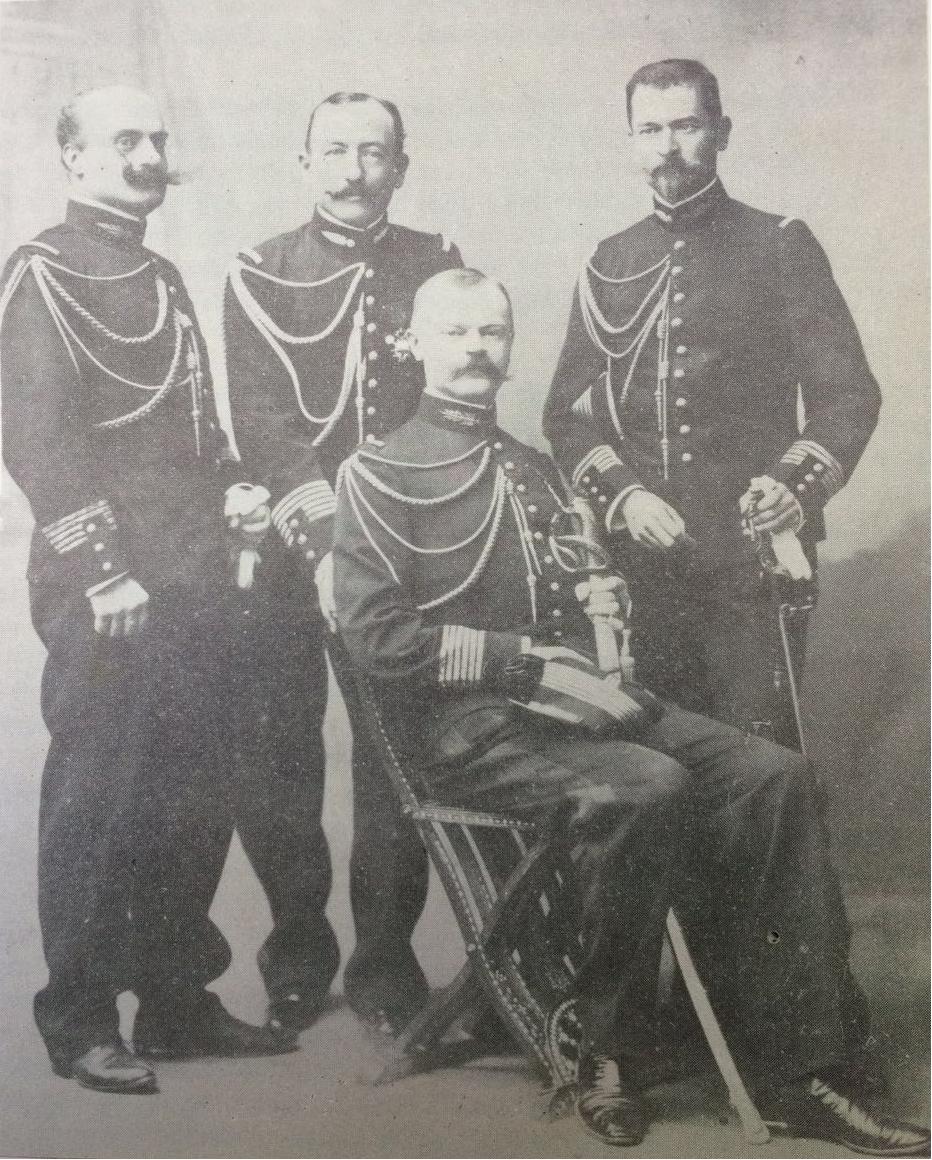
Officers from the French military mission sent to Peru in 1896 to reorganise the armed forces. This mission left its mark on the country's military traditions.

Thanks to Sunday, De Gaulle spent three full days in Peru, a longer stay than in the countries he had previously visited. This enabled him to give seven major speeches.

He was greeted by President Belaúnde Terry, who knew France well, having studied there, and welcomed him with a speech in French. The two men then entered the capital, Lima, through the Jirón de la Unión in a convertible car, with confetti being thrown by the people. The French President addressed the crowd gathered in the Plaza Mayor:

"Peruanos, Francia, tierra de historia y civilización saluda al Perú, heredero de nobles tradiciones y animado por su afán de renovación. [..] ¡Viva el Perú!"
"Peruvians, France, a land of history and civilisation, salutes Peru, heir to noble traditions and driven by its desire for renewal. [...] Long live Peru!"

The following day, after paying tribute to the heroes of the Peruvian War of Independence, he was welcomed by the students of San Marcos University to cries of Francia sí, yanquis no ('France yes, Yankees no'). The French delegation particularly enjoyed their visit to Peru's military training centre, which trains Peruvian officers. The training centre had been run by a French military mission responsible for restructuring the Peruvian army from 1896 to 1940, and the French military tradition was still evident there. On 27 October, he attended Sunday mass in the San Pedro church and spent the rest of the day meeting the Franco-Peruvian community. Shortly before his departure, there were rumours of a coup d'état in Bolivia, his next destination. Nevertheless, he decided to stay on and flew to Cochabamba on the 28th.

== Bolivia ==
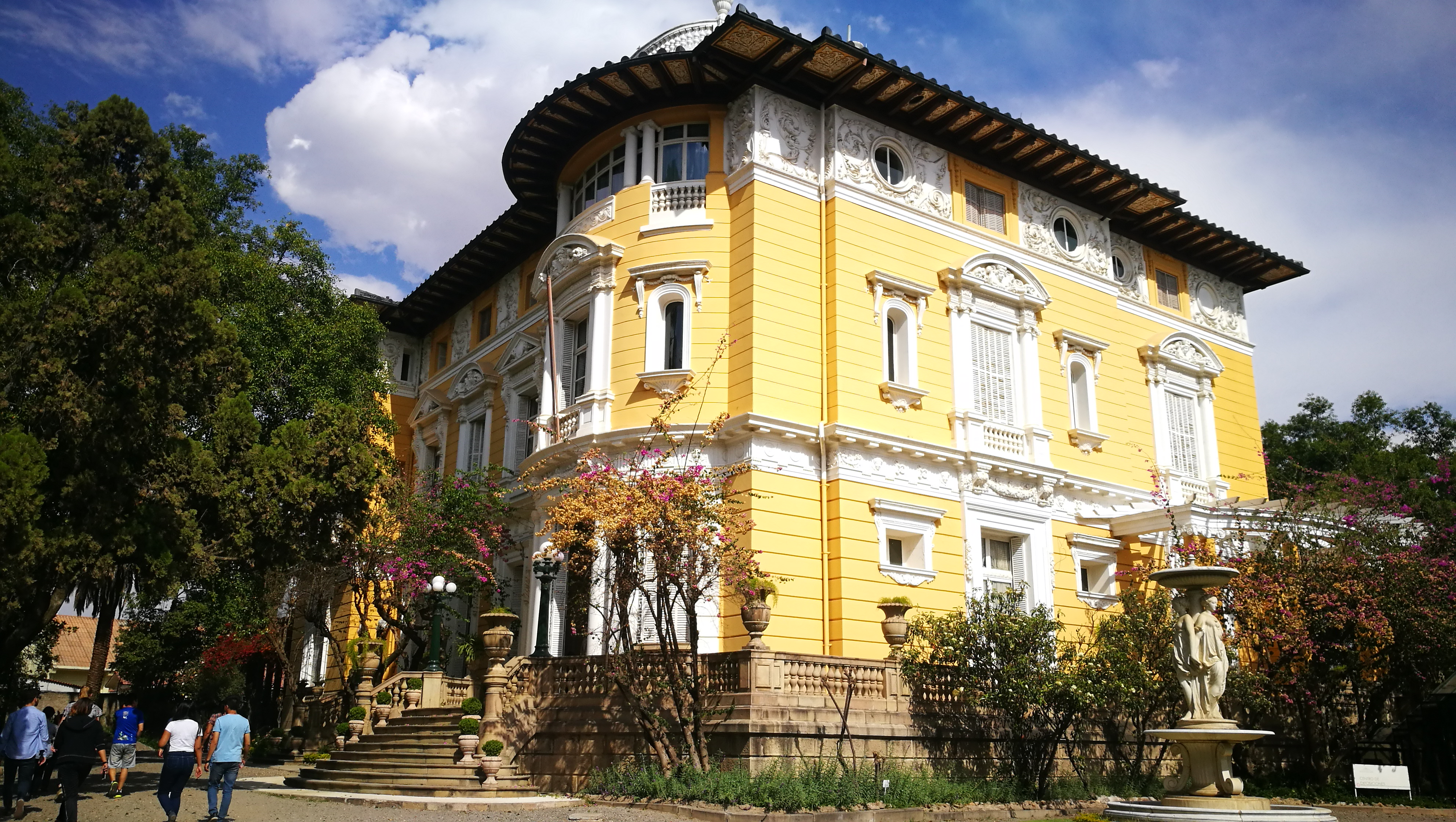
The Portales Palace, built by tin magnate Patiño in Cochabamba, was intended to house de Gaulle. It was restored in a hurry shortly before the visit, as ambassador Ponchardier had noticed that its roof was leaking and that it had no water or electricity.

The French President's doctors, who had undergone a prostate operation on 17 April 1964, feared that the altitude of La Paz, the administrative capital of Bolivia, whose centre is situated at an altitude of 3,600 m, would make it difficult for de Gaulle. It was therefore decided to move his visit to the city of Cochabamba, at an altitude of 2,570 m. There, President Víctor Paz Estenssoro, elected in 1960, was in trouble; his vice-president, René Barrientos Ortuño, was challenging his authority.

Dominique Ponchardier, who joined the Resistance in 1940 and wrote the detective series Le Gorille, was appointed French ambassador to Bolivia in 1964. According to Admiral René Besnault, this appointment was certainly linked to the presence in Bolivia of many former Nazis (including Klaus Barbie). During his visit, the President showed him a 'rare and flattering familiarity. When Ponchardier went to Cochabamba, shortly before the arrival of the French delegation, nothing was ready. The Portales palace where de Gaulle was to be housed was empty, with a leaking roof and no water or electricity. In addition, the airfield and access roads were littered with potholes. However, a provisional national reconciliation was reached between President Estensorro and his vice-president, so that the visit took place under good conditions.

Ambassador Ponchardier described how the French President was welcomed by the crowd, most of whom were Amerindian:

'In the square in front of the town hall, a motley crew of people in wild clothes and headgear crashed down. [...] The General was somewhat fascinated by this living organism, which had become mute in his presence, except for the island of tawny ponchos and the frenzied zampoña and quena players [...]. Panpipes and upright flutes, carved from reeds with a knife, tore at the musicians' lips. They alternated Marseillaise and Marche Lorraine, fashioned on the Altiplano, while blood dripped from their instruments. It was fierce, almost terrible.
— Dominique Ponchardier, La mort du condor

De Gaulle then addressed the crowd in Spanish from the balconies of the alcaldía. A Diablada, a traditional dance from the high plateaux of the Andes representing the confrontation between the forces of hell and the angels, was then launched in his honour. The picturesque nature of this short stopover in Cochabamba seems to have left its mark on the French delegation, as Georges Galichon's wife described it: 'Two rows of horsemen with halberds escorted the General's carriage. It was an incredible cavalcade, with flags flying everywhere and French carriages following the horses. The crowd that had come down from the mountains was hardly used to this kind of mob.

Although the French President's visit took place peacefully, it was in fact only a brief interlude in the period of instability that the country was going through: President Víctor Paz Estenssoro was overthrown by his vice-president René Barrientos in November 1964.

== Chile ==
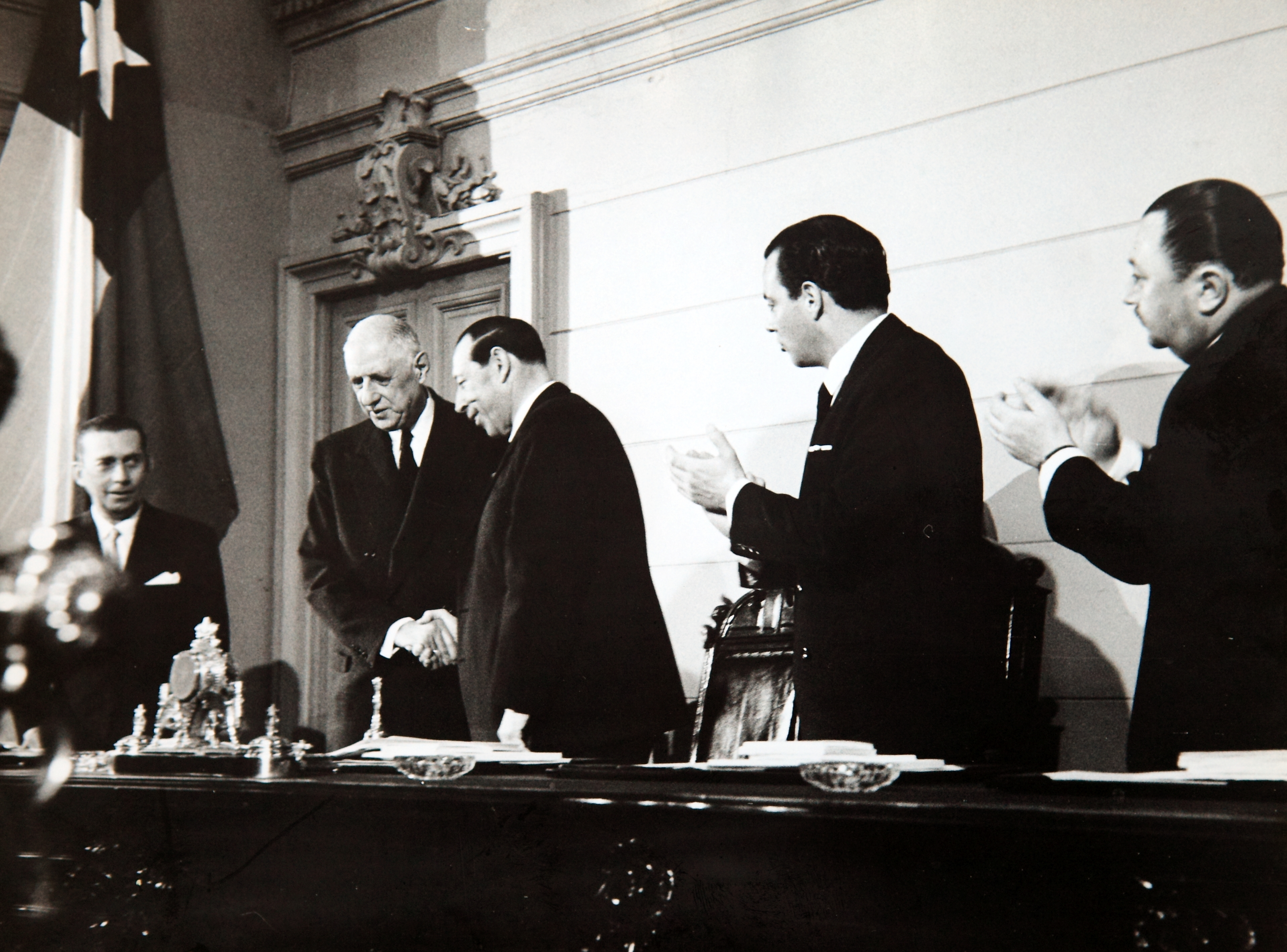
Charles de Gaulle's reception at Chile's National Congress.

De Gaulle's visit to Chile was not scheduled until late in the day. It took place the day after Eduardo Frei was elected president, with President Alessandri still in office. De Gaulle therefore had to deal with two interlocutors. At the time, Chile was considered, along with Uruguay, to be one of the two functioning democracies in South America. This visit was therefore seen as important by French diplomacy. Frei, a Christian Democrat, had an ambitious reform programme and was very popular. There was a commonality of views between Frei and de Gaulle, which led to closer ties with France during his term of office. As a result, the French President's programme of visits emphasised discussions with Frei more than those with his predecessor Alessandri, a conservative who had become disillusioned at the end of his term in office. As everywhere in South America, de Gaulle, the man of 18 June, had the aura of the 'libertador' in Chile. His visit was favourably received by the Chilean communists, who held an important position in the country. They saw de Gaulle as an anti-imperialist and anti-fascist figure. Salvador Allende, who, with the support of the Communists, won 38.9% of the vote in the 1964 presidential election, felt that 'General de Gaulle's policy [...] corresponds to the vision of a head of state who wishes to see Latin America [...] free from the tutelage that weighs on a large part of the Western world and also, from the economic point of view, to draw closer not only to Western Europe but also to the socialist world.

De Gaulle landed at Chacalluta airport in Arica, in the far north of Chile, on 29 September 1964 from Bolivia. He was received by Foreign Minister Julio Philippi and the town's mayor. The French ambassador to Chile, Christian Auboyneau, reported that half the inhabitants of Arica came to greet him on his arrival. Shortly afterwards, he boarded the cruiser Colbert bound for Valparaíso. This 900-mile journey southwards along the Chilean coast gave him time to rest and sign a number of laws and decrees, which were published a few days later in the Journal officiel with the words 'Fait à bord du Colbert. C. de Gaulle". He also took the opportunity to correct the proofs of François Mauriac's De Gaulle. His only public appearance on board was at Sunday mass.

The four-masted schooner Esmeralda, a training ship of the Chilean navy, came to greet the arrival of the Colbert in Valparaiso on 1 October. De Gaulle was received by President Alessandri, and the two Heads of State were cheered by the crowd in the city's main square. The convoy moved slowly, slowed down by the population who wanted to greet de Gaulle, which put Foreign Minister Couve de Murville in a bad mood, worried about security. De Gaulle, on the other hand, was delighted by this prolonged contact with the population. After driving for 1 hour 40 minutes, the French arrived in the capital, Santiago. The French President stayed at the Cousiño Palace, the government guest house. He visited the University of Chile, met President-elect Frei and President Alessandri at La Moneda. He attended a gala dinner, at the end of which he appeared on the balcony to greet the crowds who had waited to see him appear late into the night. On 2 October, he held talks with the President of the Supreme Court, visited Congress and the Alliance Française. In the afternoon, he left for Rancagua, 87 km south of Santiago, to take part in the commemoration of the fiftieth anniversary of the Battle of Rancagua, an important date in the Chilean War of Independence. De Gaulle gave a brief speech in the municipal stadium. According to Le Monde, the atmosphere was 'like a country party and a bullfight. The president's speech was 'interrupted by frenzied applause. He might as well have been reciting the multiplication table. The good-natured, joyful audience had obviously won him over in advance. The next day, the French took off from Santiago for Argentina.

According to Le Monde of 2 October, 'the Chilean leg has been the most successful so far. An editorial in Le Figaro of the same day emphasised that "while we can talk about tourism from Caracas to Cochabamba, we can say that the serious business began in Santiago. It was there that the expedition acquired real political significance". Eduardo Frei himself visited de Gaulle in France in July 1965 and relations between the two countries remained strong until the General's departure.

== Argentina ==
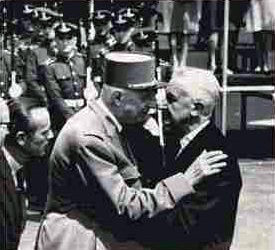
Argentine President Arturo Umberto Illia receiving de Gaulle during his visit to Argentina.

The visit to Argentina took place in a particular political context. There were strong tensions between Arturo Umberto Illia's government and the supporters of former president Juan Perón, who had been in exile since 1955 and whose banned movement was unable to stand in the elections. The country also had a large French community. These emigrants included a number of former Vichyists who had left for South America after the war, but who were largely inactive in the political arena. When Algeria gained independence in 1962, a number of Pieds-noirs settled in Argentina. They included former OAS members such as General Gardy, Colonel Gardes and Captain de Gorostarzu. They received Argentine and French assistance to set up farms, often in very isolated areas, particularly in the case of General Gardy and his family in Misión Tacaaglé, a small farming community not far from the border with Paraguay. These two factors led to fears of incidents during de Gaulle's stay.

De Gaulle arrived in Buenos Aires, the capital of Argentina, on 3 October. The Peronists immediately seized the opportunity presented by his visit to emerge from the invisibility in which they were kept by the powers that be. During his first walkabout in the Plaza Francia, de Gaulle was surrounded by Peronist militants. They carried portraits of the exiled president and associated the two men in their slogans: "Perón, de Gaulle, the same fight", "Perón, de Gaulle, the third way". New Peronist demonstrations took place when he left Congress, as the population had come to cheer him. The strategy of the Peronists, who had clandestinely printed thousands of posters of Perón, took by surprise the local police, who were in charge of the French President's security service.

The Argentinian authorities then took control, and the days of 4 and 5 October passed off without incident, although the places where de Gaulle visited were tightly cordoned off and screened. At the Faculty of Law in Buenos Aires, where de Gaulle was due to meet young students, he gave his speech to an audience of public officials who had been summoned to attend in numbers. De Gaulle also went to an estancia on the outskirts of Buenos Aires where he attended rodeos, "a manifestation of gaucho civilisation", an activity that seems to have bored him to tears. He was given a foal, "a gift that somewhat embarrassed the diplomatic services responsible for sending the animal to its destination". On the last day of his stay in Buenos Aires, a reception was held at the French embassy. Among the many guests de Gaulle met were the author Victoria Ocampo and a delegation of pieds-noirs from Mostaganem who had recently settled in Argentina with material aid from France.

On 6 October, the President travelled to Córdoba to visit the IKA factory, which manufactures Renault cars. This last leg of his Argentine tour was marked by major disturbances between Peronists and the police. Four people were shot and injured, and many were arrested and detained. The French President then flew directly to Paraguay.

This Peronist agitation helped to sow confusion in certain quarters about the French President's intentions. Rumours began to circulate among the extreme Catholic right about a de Gaulle-Perón alliance aimed at allowing Perón to return from exile and at jointly pursuing a 'Nasserist' policy favouring the establishment of communism in the country. This unsubstantiated rumour was echoed in conservative Argentine circles and is said to have led the Argentine general staff to distance itself from de Gaulle. The French ambassador Christian de Margerie noted that President Illia's government had emerged from the visit weakened, unable to resolve the issue of reintegrating the Peronists into public life, while the 'military party' was gnawing at its fingernails.

On the other hand, there did not seem to be any desire for violent action on the part of French opponents of de Gaulle living in Argentina. Often geographically isolated and in a precarious material situation, they kept a low profile.

== Paraguay ==
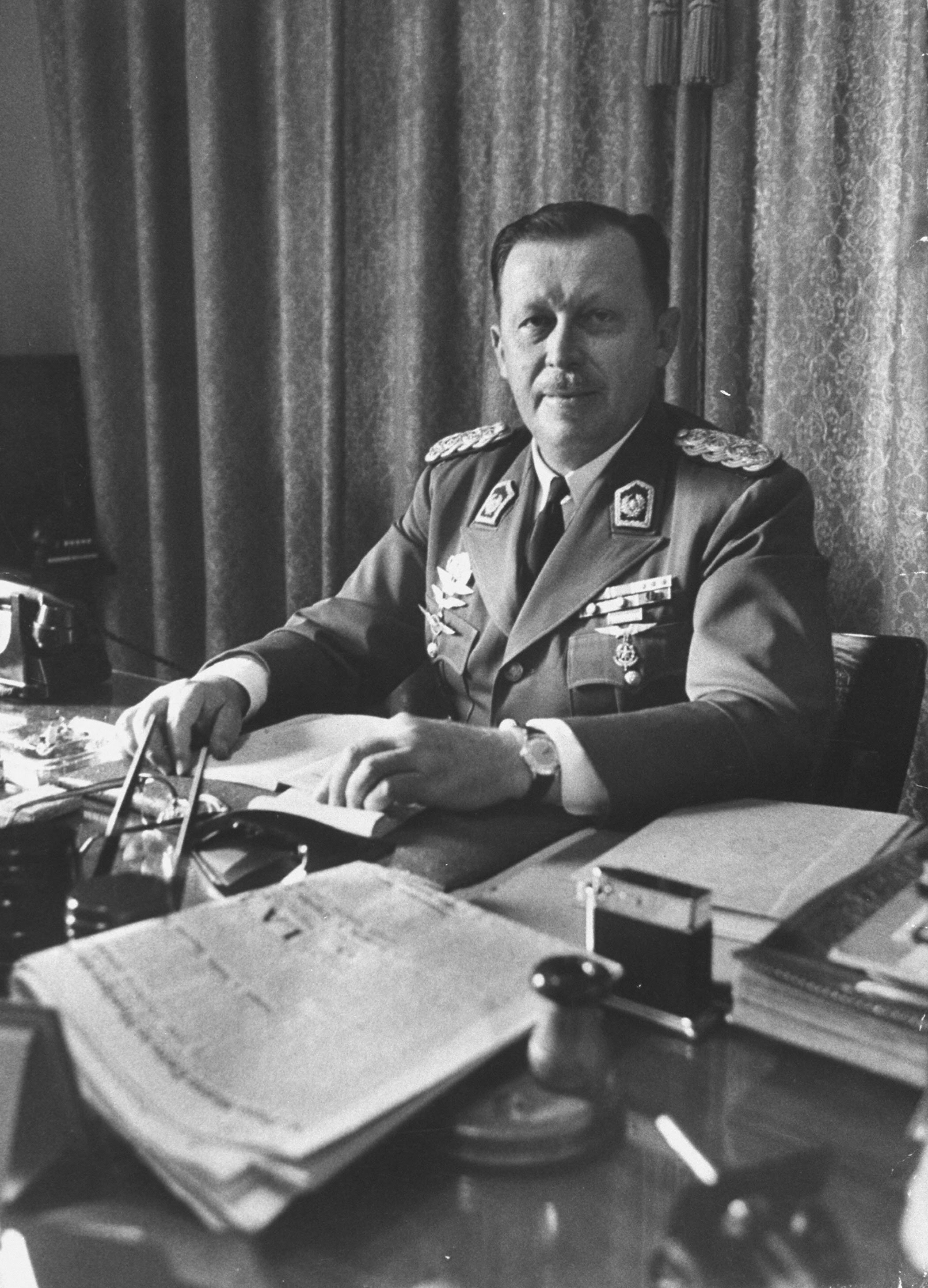
Dictator Alfredo Stroessner used the French President's visit to legitimise his autocratic power over Paraguay, which he had ruled since 1954.

General Stroessner, who set up an autocratic regime in Paraguay in 1954, intended to use the French diplomatic visit to promote his regime and himself. The occasion was an important one, as de Gaulle was the first non-bordering head of state to pay an official visit to the country since taking power. Stroessner controlled the country thanks to his authority in the army, the state apparatus and the Colorado, the mass party that controlled the population.

The French President's two-day visit to the capital, Asuncion, was perfectly orchestrated. There were no imposing security arrangements, as the brutally repressed opposition was unable to take any action. The regime staged the two Heads of State side by side, inducing the idea of intimacy between the two men. Unlike the other visits on the trip, de Gaulle did not meet with the legislature in Paraguay, nor did he visit any universities or businesses. The Colorado party organised mass demonstrations, involving schools, the army and neighbourhoods. To ensure a warm welcome, the regime granted leave to civil servants. In fact, according to the French ambassador, the French President's contact with the population was 'exceptionally exuberant, joyful and good-natured. De Gaulle showed no sign of wanting to distance himself from the use made of his visit by the particularly brutal Stroessner regime. In doing so, he remained true to his principles of political realism in international relations, believing that it was necessary to establish relations with a multiplicity of regimes.

== Uruguay ==
The presidential Caravelle landed at Carrasco airport serving Montevideo, the capital of Uruguay, on the morning of 8 October in pouring rain. De Gaulle was welcomed by the President of the National Government Council, Luis Giannattasio. Despite the inclement weather, a large crowd - Le Monde journalists put the number in the hundreds of thousands - lined the route as he made his way to the country's capital. The meeting with former members of the Free French Forces (FFL) was one of the highlights of the visit. Indeed, the country had one FFL volunteer for every 2,000 inhabitants. They presented him with a riding crop bearing the silver words "On the enemies of France, strike hard".

On 10 October, after a farewell ceremony at the port of call, de Gaulle set sail for Brazil aboard the Colbert, which had crossed the Strait of Magellan from the Pacific to the Atlantic.

== Brazil ==
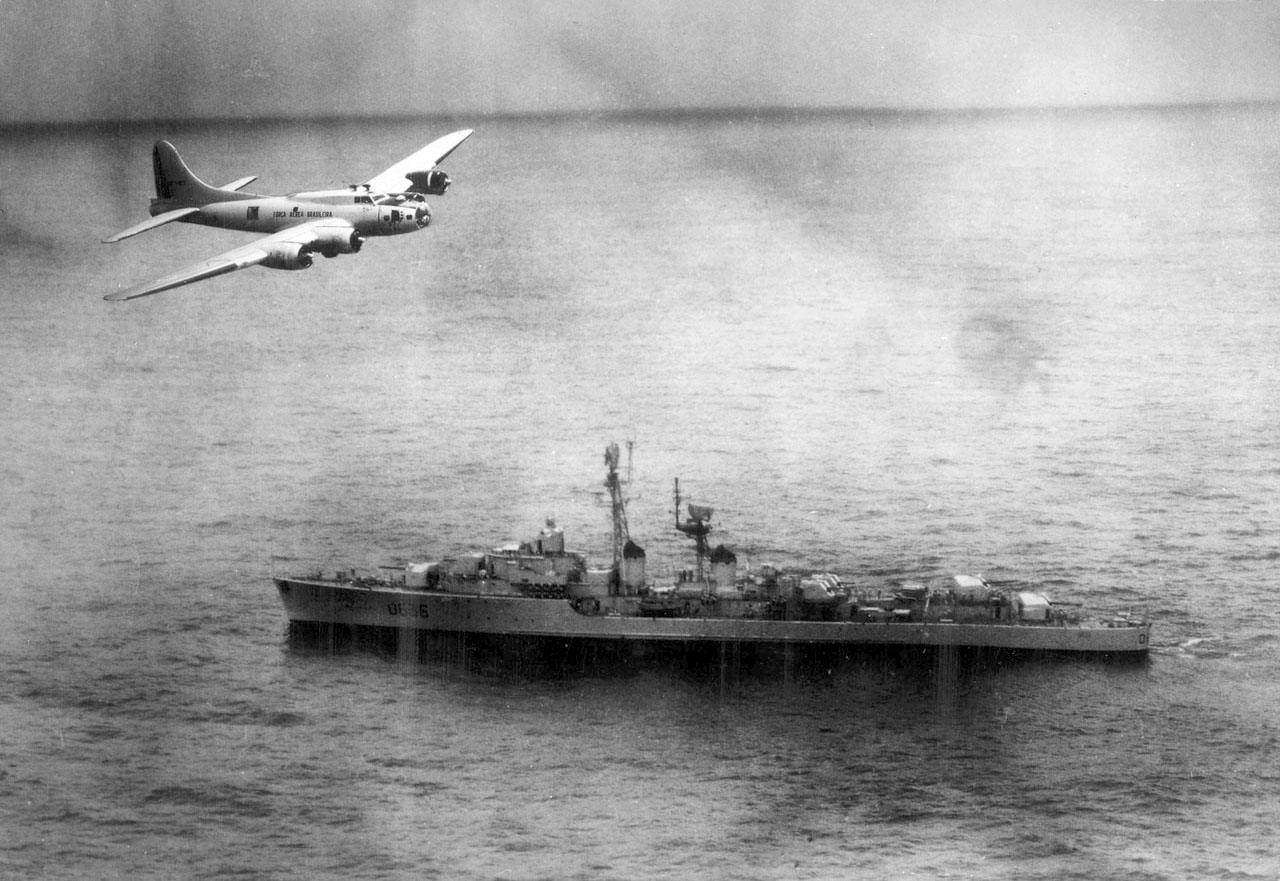
A Brazilian Air Force B-17 bomber flies over the French escort ship Tartu off the coast of Brazil during the Lobster War. This dispute soured Franco-Brazilian relations in 1963.

Brazil was not initially on the French President's itinerary because of the Lobster War, a dispute over French fishing near Brazilian waters that poisoned relations between the two countries from 1961 onwards. During negotiations with the Brazilian ambassador to France, Carlos Alves de Souza Filho, the latter, convinced by the French argument, declared to the press that "Brazil is not a serious country". This statement, wrongly attributed to de Gaulle, was widely echoed in Brazil. Brazilian President João Goulart nevertheless ended up sending a letter of invitation to de Gaulle in January 1964. However, he was overthrown by a military junta led by Castelo Branco who, with the support of the United States, took power on 1 April 1964. Gaulle renewed the invitation, but the domestic situation was unstable during the presidential visit and relations between the two countries continued to deteriorate.

When the Colbert arrived in Rio's harbour, the governor of the state of Guanabara, Carlos Lacerda, refused to welcome it. The Workers' Party of Goulart, the deposed president, encouraged the population to take to the streets to greet the French president and "show Brazil's admiration for France and freedom", which was not to the liking of the military authorities. On 13 October, de Gaulle went to Brasília, the capital inaugurated in 1960, where he visited Congress, the Planalto Palace and the University of Brasília. On 15 October, de Gaulle visited two factories in São Paulo, COSIPA (metallurgy) and the workshops of the car manufacturer Simca. In the afternoon, he returned to Rio where he gave a speech at the Staff College. News from the USSR, where Khrushchev had been forced to resign, meant that the last day of the President's trip took a back seat. Charles de Gaulle flew back to France in a Boeing on 16 October.

== Follow-up and consequences ==
=== Media coverage ===
The presidential trip received extensive coverage in the French media. Forty-four special envoys followed de Gaulle on board a DC-6. They included Marcel Niedergang and André Passeron from Le Monde, Denis Périer Daville, Michel Bassi and Daniel Garric from Le Figaro. The Office de radiodiffusion-télévision française (ORTF), which held a monopoly on the French audiovisual landscape at the time, and which de Gaulle had turned into a powerful communications tool in his service, devoted a special programme to the trip. The report featured close-ups of the General. The commentator, Jean Lanzi, praised 'an extraordinary journey. The event also received extensive coverage in the South American press. South American articles, cartoons and books devoted to the visit were generally full of respect for the French President and interest in his political action. In Argentina, the presidential visit was long enough to see the appearance of 'degolitos', a neologism formed by analogy with 'futbolitos', football news. The event was also widely covered by the North American press, but unlike its South American counterpart, it was largely hostile to de Gaulle. However, given the small number of letters received from readers, it seems that the visit was of only marginal interest to the public in the United States.

=== In Latin America ===
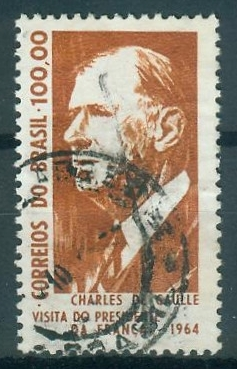
Brazilian stamp from 1964 commemorating Charles de Gaulle's visit.

In the short term, the General's South American tour led to a significant revival of interest in France in South America. De Gaulle succeeded in rallying people around himself:

"General de Gaulle is the champion of identification. The Venezuelans identified him with Bolivar. Now the Argentinians identify him with Perón. Others around the world have identified him with Tito, La Fayette, Ben Bella, Khrushchev, Napoleon, Franco, Churchill, Mao, Nasser, Frederick Barbarossa, not forgetting Joan of Arc and Georges Clemenceau. He is the Proteus of history, the Fregoli of politics. He speaks every language, takes on every face, plays every role".
— Robert Escarpit, Le Monde.

In several countries, stamps bearing the effigy of Charles de Gaulle were issued to commemorate his visit. This was particularly the case in Paraguay, where several stamps featured the dictator Stroessner and de Gaulle side by side.

However, as Le Monde pointed out, the public welcome varied from one country to another: "friendly without excess in Caracas, fervent and serious in Bogotá, exuberant and unbridled in Quito, curious and distinguished in Lima, moving in Cochabamba. Moreover, in Bolivia and Ecuador, the majority of the population, of Amerindian descent, did not understand his speeches in Spanish, which was not their native language. In Brazil, Charles de Gaulle's visit was overshadowed by the announcement of Khrushchev's resignation, while in Argentina it was exploited and disrupted by the Peronist opposition".

Furthermore, while some of the themes of the French President's speeches were well received - such as the call for cooperation, independence and the freedom of peoples to self-determination - others were not. This was the case with de Gaulle's comments on "hegemonies" and the third way, which were aimed directly at the United States' stranglehold on Latin America. Several heads of state were keen to stress that they enjoyed excellent relations with their North American neighbour and had no intention of changing their foreign policy. Chilean President Alessandri, for example, replied to de Gaulle that the country's relations with the United States were "not at all bad" and that it depended heavily on American economic assistance. Colombian President Valencia shocked his country's elites with his excessive praise of the excellence of US-Colombian relations. As for the Peruvian president, he points out that "Of course we like France. We are both interested and flattered by General de Gaulle's visit. But the reality is clear: we depend on the United States for foreign aid, and the United States directly or indirectly controls a large part of our production". The Gaullist concept of "latinidad" was not universally accepted either, especially in countries where the Amerindian element was predominant. By emphasising the links between the Old Continent and America, all against a clerical backdrop, de Gaulle was at odds with local identity constructs that emphasised references to Amerindian origins, and African origins in Brazil, a country that had just won the World Cup thanks to Pelé, a black player, and where tropicalism was in vogue.

Paradoxically, de Gaulle, who was seen as right-wing on the Old Continent, was admired in Latin America by thinkers on the left, while the right tended to adopt a pro-American stance. Cuba's Castro regime took a very positive view of the French President's trip, and the country's newsreels recounted the visits in detail, with the Cuban ambassador to France simply expressing regret that the Head of State did not stop off in Havana.

=== In the United States ===
John F. Kennedy on an official trip to Venezuela and Colombia in December 1961. The Kennedy Doctrine gave rise to the Alliance for Progress, an ambitious development plan aimed at blocking communism in Latin America.

The Americans followed the French visit closely. There was a real rivalry between Kennedy and de Gaulle when it came to presidential trips. The American head of state made numerous visits abroad. His "Ich bin ein Berliner" speech in June 1963 to standing ovations in Berlin has gone down in history, but he also made several visits to Latin America. French and American observers were quick to compare the performances of the two presidents on this continent. For example, Le Monde emphasised that "the general opinion was that the welcome reserved [...] by the Colombian capital for General de Gaulle far exceeded that given to President Kennedy". Symmetrically, the CIA reported in a document that "in general, de Gaulle drew large and friendly crowds, but in Venezuela and Colombia they were half the size of those during President Kennedy's visit in 1961". American diplomatic missions were instructed not to react to the French visit. Initially, the government of President Lyndon B. Johnson's government feared that the French visit would cause difficulties because of the anti-American tone of its speeches. However, the American services noted that de Gaulle remained rather allusive in his criticisms. For example, he never mentioned the Cuban crisis during his visits. These same sources also noted that in no South American country did French investment represent more than 10% of all foreign investment, and that France's trade links in the region were inferior to those of West Germany or the United Kingdom. They therefore feel that France does not have the means to seriously compete with American influence in the region.

=== In the longer term ===
The visit marked the start of a new era in relations between France and South America, but France did not have the resources to match its ambitions. Some, like Étienne Burin des Roziers, the Secretary General of the Presidency who accompanied de Gaulle, wondered whether the President's trip was a "flash in the pan". The journalist and historian Paul-Marie de La Gorce also points out, five years after the visit, that "although this policy gave France great prestige in Latin America, repelled by the other European powers, it remained more an intention than a reality".

Politically, the impact was indistinguishable. The years following the presidential visit saw a proliferation of authoritarian regimes in Latin America. The South American republics, faced with multiple economic difficulties, increased their dependence on the North American protector. Charles de Gaulle's efforts to promote a multipolar South America therefore failed.

The French financial effort in South America, although limited, was real. French aid to Latin America tripled in the 1960s, with France almost catching up with West Germany in this respect. France won few contracts following the visit. French companies won the Mexico City metro contract, but there was no follow-up to Franco-Brazilian nuclear cooperation projects and the dispute with Brazil over fishing rights, which had led to the Lobster War, was not resolved.

The results of the visit were more in the field of technical cooperation and culture. The Lycée Franco-Argentin Jean Mermoz was inaugurated in 1969. Technical cooperation agreements were signed, for example in Uruguay in the areas of forestry and agricultural training. However, in both Uruguay and Bolivia, the agreements were hampered by administrative delays.

One of the lessons de Gaulle drew from his South American trip was the need for joint European political action capable of standing up to American influence. In a message to German Chancellor Konrad Adenauer, he said: "I have returned from my trip to South America convinced that it is up to Europe to play a major role on this continent to which it is attached by so many interests, friendships and traditions".

The historian Maurice Vaïsse insists that "the General's merit is to have perceived 'a particular psychological moment on the South American continent' and to have sown a message of hope". Régis Debray reminded de Gaulle of this message of hope in 1967, when he wrote to de Gaulle, sentenced to thirty years' imprisonment in Bolivia for his participation in Che Guevara's guerrilla foco: "The dignity they are seeking to regain for themselves and for their country is embodied in your name [...]. In the mountains, when we listen to foreign radio stations around the fire in the evening, we are happy to pick up the voice of France, which, although distant, unintelligible for many, and sometimes discordant, nevertheless nourishes hope".

== Appendices ==
=== Bibliography ===
- Gruat, Cédric (2010). Les langues du général. Paris: J.-C. Lattès. ISBN 978-2-7096-3575-2.
- Nünlist, Christian; Locher, Anna; Martin, Garret, eds. (2010). Globalizing de Gaulle: international perspectives on French foreign policies, 1958-1969. The Harvard Cold War studies book series. Lanham, Md: Lexington Books. ISBN 978-0-7391-4248-6. OCLC 428895768.
- Trouvé, Matthieu (2002). "Entre spectacle et mission. Le voyage du général de Gaulle en Amérique du Sud du 21 septembre au 16 octobre 1964" (PDF). Espoir (in French) (130). Archived (PDF) from the original on 2021-05-08.
- Vaïsse, Maurice, ed. (2014). De Gaulle et l'Amérique latine. Des Amériques (in French). Rennes: Presses universitaires de Rennes. doi:10.4000/books.pur.42514. ISBN 978-2-7535-5279-1. OCLC 1397968067.

=== Archives ===
- Speeches (archive) given by Charles de Gaulle during his trip to South America, held at the Archives Nationales, file number AG/5(1)/1440, partly digitised.

=== Audiovisual and radio ===
- Le voyage présidentiel en Amérique du Sud (archive), report broadcast on 18 October 1964, preserved by INA.
- "Le voyage de de Gaulle en Amérique latine" (archive), La fabrique de l'histoire, France Culture, 04/10/16.
