= Phnom Penh speech =

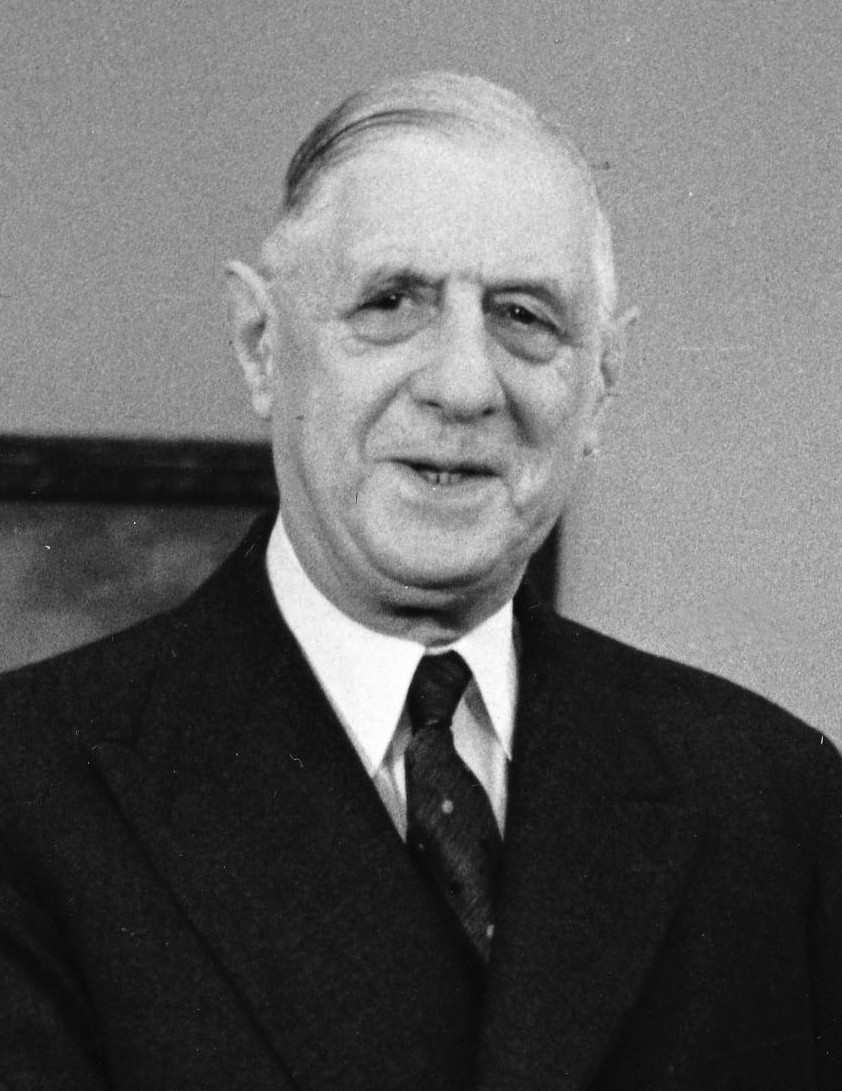
Charles de Gaulle, in 1963.

The Phnom Penh speech (Discours de Phnom Penh) is a speech delivered by the President of France Charles de Gaulle at the Olympic Stadium in the capital of Cambodia, Phnom Penh, on 1 September 1966, before a crowd of more than 100,000 people.

== Context ==
During its brief existence, the French Fourth Republic largely pursued an Atlanticist foreign policy. Since his return to power in 1958, Charles de Gaulle advocated for French sovereignty and independence, aiming to provide an alternative to the two blocs dominated by the United States and the Soviet Union. This approach mirrored the spirit of the 1961 Belgrade Conference and the Non-Aligned Movement, of which Cambodia was a participant.

De Gaulle sought to support states that, like France, desired an alternative to the dominance of the two "superpowers." On 20 August 1966, Norodom Sihanouk, the head of state of Cambodia, stated in an interview with French journalist François Chalais for the ORTF that "since General de Gaulle's return to power, France has resolutely supported our policy of independence, peace, and non-alignment, as well as the defense of our territorial integrity. It also provides generous and unconditional aid to our national development. It is the only Western power that unequivocally recognizes the authenticity of our neutrality and the progress we have achieved through our own efforts and sacrifices."

Since 1959, the United States had been engaged in combat in Vietnam, a former region of French Indochina. This came despite their previous criticism of the French military intervention in these territories. The speech offered De Gaulle an opportunity to demonstrate, first, that France remained interested in its former colonies and, second, that France did not necessarily align with U.S. foreign policy. In a sense, De Gaulle turned the tables, criticizing the U.S. intervention in Vietnam.

In this speech, De Gaulle affirmed the "right of peoples to self-determination," a statement made possible by the decolonization of Algeria and marking a departure from previous French foreign policy, which had been heavily tied to the French colonial empire. After enduring diplomatic isolation during the Algerian War, De Gaulle could now promote the principle of decolonization.

== The Speech ==
"I declare here that France fully supports Cambodia in its efforts to remain outside the conflict and that it will continue to offer its assistance and backing for this purpose. Yes, France's position is clear. It is one of disapproval and condemnation concerning the current events. It is also determined to avoid, under any circumstances and whatever happens, being automatically involved in the potential expansion of the drama and to maintain its freedom of action. Furthermore, it is exemplified by the example it set in North Africa by deliberately ending sterile fighting on territory where, despite its dominance, it had administrated for 132 years and where over a million of its children had settled.

But, as those fights neither engaged its honor nor its independence, and at a time when they could lead only to increased losses, hatred, and destruction, France chose and managed to withdraw without affecting its prestige, power, or prosperity. Similarly, France considers that the fighting ravaging Indochina offers no solution. According to France, while it is implausible that the American war machine could ever be destroyed on the ground, it is equally impossible that the peoples of Asia will submit to the rule of a foreigner from across the Pacific, no matter their intentions or the power of their weapons. In France's eyes, therefore, there can be no military solution to the conflict.

Only a political settlement could restore peace unless the world heads toward catastrophe. The terms of such a settlement are well understood, aiming to establish and guarantee the neutrality of Indochina's peoples and their right to self-determination. The powers actually exercising authority there and at least the five global powers would need to be parties to such an agreement. However, this possibility—and even more so the initiation of such a broad and difficult negotiation—would depend on America's decision to repatriate its forces within an agreed and defined timeframe. While such a solution may seem far from likely today, France believes there is no other viable option unless we wish to condemn the world to increasing misery.

France expresses this view based on its experience, disinterestedness, and the bonds it once forged with this region of Asia. It says this out of the exceptional friendship it has maintained for centuries with America and the ideals that both nations share. France has consistently offered these warnings to Washington before irreparable actions were taken. And France believes that if the U.S., with its current power, wealth, and influence, were to choose to forego a remote expedition with no clear benefit or justification in favor of an international arrangement fostering peace and development, it would enhance its prestige, ideals, and interests. Such a path would renew its standing in the world.

Where better than Phnom Penh to articulate this hope and this stance, as it aligns with those of Cambodia? Long live Cambodia!"

== Consequences ==
While the speech had some impact in France, it had little influence on the subsequent events. The Americans, the main targets of the address, reacted with mild irritation but did not alter their stance on the Vietnam War.

The following years saw a decline in Sihanouk's influence over Cambodian affairs. As the presence of the Viet Cong grew in eastern Cambodia, pro-American elites gained prominence in Phnom Penh, culminating in Sihanouk's ousting in 1970. The new government aligned with Washington, propelling the country into war.

After this declaration, the Republic of Vietnam (South Vietnam) broke diplomatic relations with France, aware it could not withstand the North militarily. Vietnamese nationals were subsequently barred from traveling to France, including for educational purposes.
