= Danish collaborator trials =

Post WWII trials of Nazi collaborators

The Danish collaborator trials took place in Denmark in the aftermath of World War II. Danish citizens who were accused of collaborating with the Nazis during their occupation of Denmark were put on trial.

The basis for the trials was the Criminal Code supplement drawn up in the last year of the Occupation, and adopted shortly after Liberation. The Criminal Code Supplement criminalized acts that had taken place after August 29, 1943; this became one of the most serious criticisms of this law, that it retroactively applied to actions before it passed.

The accused under the penal code supplement were in particular persons who had participated in German war service or had had undue financial cooperation with the occupying power. Trials were conducted at the Copenhagen Municipal Court and sentences were passed from November 1947 to November 1950.

After the war, 101 men and 2 women were sentenced to death by the treason court cases during the German occupation of Denmark. Of these, the 78 judgments were upheld by both the Eastern and Western Lands and the Supreme Court. Forty-six men were executed, while 30 men and two women were pardoned by the Justice Minister and allowed to change their sentences to life in prison.

Of the 32 who served life imprisonment, the last was released in 1956. All foreign nationals who had been sentenced to death were pardoned, so only Danish nationals were executed.

The two women who were sentenced to death were Grethe Bartram and Anna Lund Lorentzen. Both sentences were commuted to life imprisonment and both women were released in 1956.

In 2005 the Danish government formally apologized for its role in aiding the Nazis during the war.

== See also ==
- Liberation of France
- Collaborationism
