= André Diethelm =

French politician and Resistance member

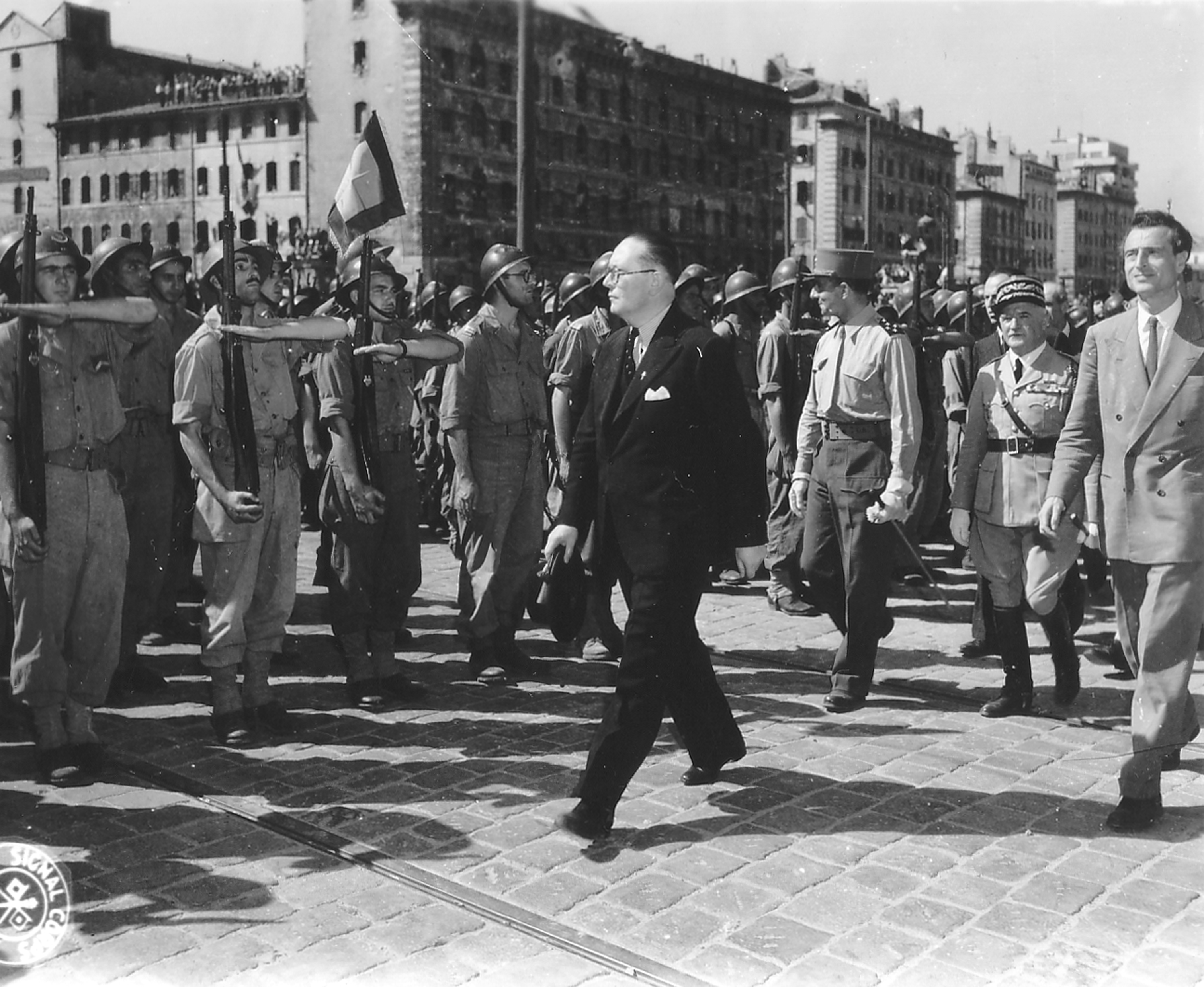
- André Diethelm (center) reviews troops in liberated Marseille (Aug. 1944)

Commissioner of Cities, Labor, and Information
- In office 1941–1943

Deputy of the National Assembly
- In office 1945–1946

Deputy of the National Assembly
- In office 1951–1954

Senator
- In office 1948–1951

Personal details
- Born: July 3, 1896 Bourg-en-Bresse
- Died: January 11, 1954 (aged 57) Paris
- Party: Farmers' Social Union Party
- Other political affiliations: Rally of the French People

André Diethelm (3 July 1896 – 11 January 1954) was a French Resistance fighter and politician. As an Inspector General of Finance, he joined General de Gaulle and Free France during the Second World War, and presided over the Rally of the French People political party (Rassemblement du peuple français (RPF)) under the Fourth Republic.

== Early life and education ==
He was born in Bourg-en-Bresse (Ain department) and pursued a secondary education in Foix. He was admitted to the prestigious École normale supérieure in Paris in 1914, but the war interrupted his studies just as they began.

== Career ==
Diethelm fought in the First World War, in Alsace, on the Eastern front, and in Greece.

After the war, he returned to the École normale supérieure but in 1919 he gave up taking the competitive civil service exam, preferring to go for the competitive exam for the Inspectorate General of Finances, in which he came in second. He was in charge of the finances of Indochina, then became director of Georges Mandel's cabinet from 1938 to 1940.

=== French Resistance ===
Joining Free France, he was appointed commissioner for the Interior, Labour and Information, by de Gaulle, then for Finance and Pensions, and finally for Finance, the Economy and the Merchant Navy under the French National Committee in 1941–1943. He was the first director of the Caisse Centrale de la France Libre.

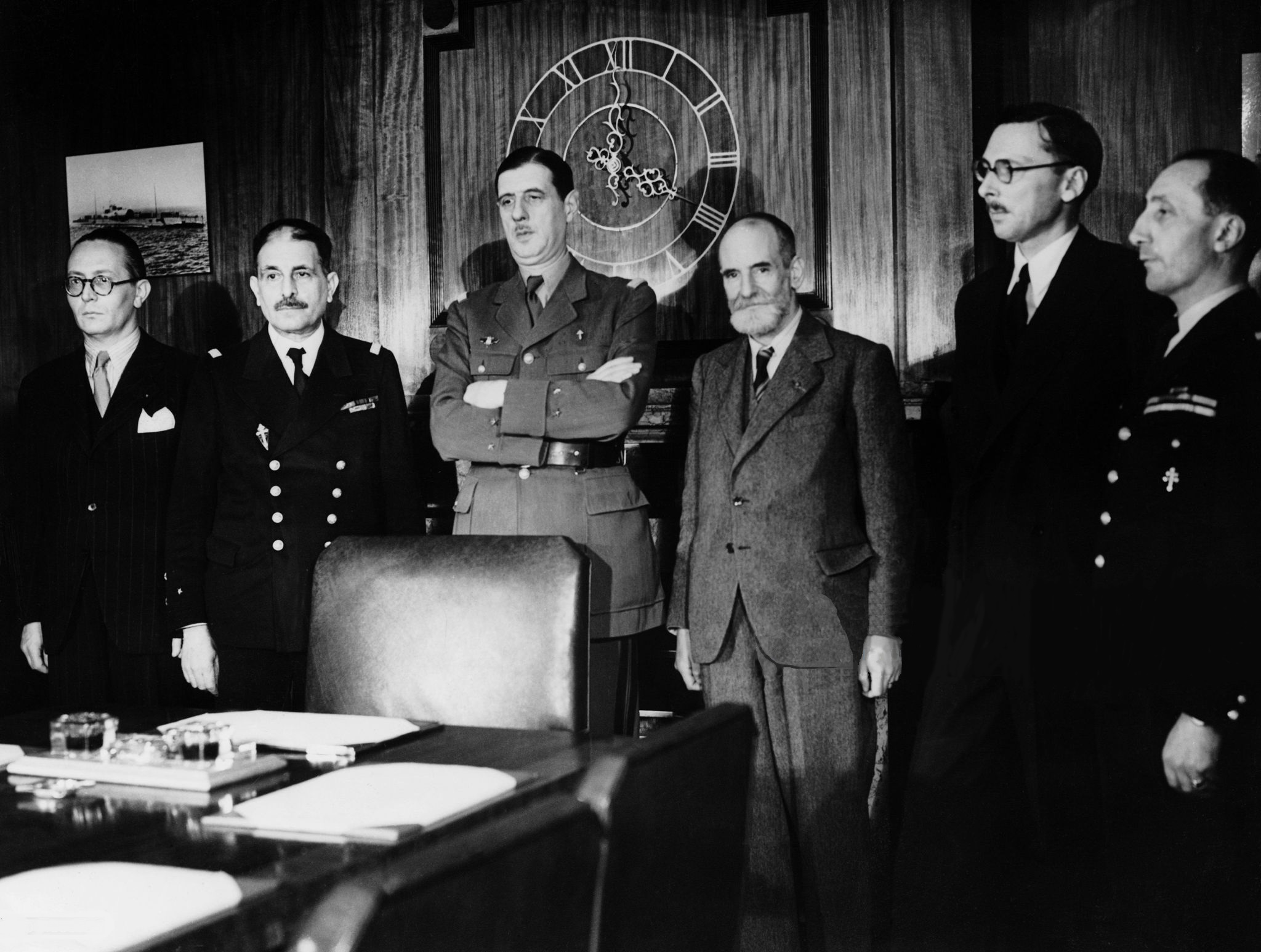
André Diethelm in the French National Committee in London.

In the government of Algiers (French Committee of National Liberation, CFLN), he was commissioner for Production and Commerce, then for Supply and Production. On 4 April 1944, he became War Commissioner. And on 9 September 1944, Minister of War in the first government of Charles de Gaulle through 21 November 1945.

Deputy of the Vosges in the Constitutional Assembly of 1945, he then sat on the Council of the Republic from 1948 to 1951. Then he was deputy for the Seine-et-Oise department in 1951. He succeeded Jacques Soustelle as President of the Rally of the French People (RPF) faction in the National Assembly, then chaired the Union of Republicans for Social Action (URAS). Sickness forced him to give up his post, which was taken over by Jacques Chaban-Delmas. President Vincent Auriol asked him to form a government on 24 May 1953, but he refused.

== Honors and awards ==
- Knight of the Order of Legion of Honour (1918)
- Resistance Medal (1947)

== Death ==
Diethelm died on 11 January 1954 in Paris.

== See also ==
- Allies of World War II
- André Philip
- Émile Muselier
- Foreign policy of Charles de Gaulle
- Free French Africa
- French Colonial Empire
- French Fourth Republic
- French Resistance
- French Third Republic
- Georges Catroux
- Georges Thierry d'Argenlieu
- Jean Moulin
- Liberation of France
- Liberation of Paris
- Martial Valin
- Military history of France during World War II
- Paul Legentilhomme
- Philippe Auboyneau
- Philippe Pétain
- Provisional Government of the French Republic
- René Pleven
- Vichy France

== Works cited ==
- Tirouflet, Michel [in French] (2012). André Diethelm (1896–1954): le pilier de la France libre (in French). Paris: Éditions Nicolas Chaudun. ISBN 978-2-35039-148-9.
