= French Civil and Military High Command =

Governmental organ of Free France in World War II

- Commission of Free France
- Date formed: 13 November 1942
- Date dissolved: 3 June 1943

People and organisations
- Status in legislature: none
- Opposition party: French State

History
- Incoming formation: created by Darlan after Allied invasion in North Africa
- Outgoing formation: merged with French National Committee to form French Committee of National Liberation
- Predecessor: Vichy regime
- Successor: French Committee of National Liberation

Location of Algiers

The French Civil and Military High Command (French: Commandement en chef français civil et militaire) was an administrative and military governing body in Algiers that was created in connection with the Allied landings in French North Africa on 7 and 8 November 1942 as part of Operation Torch. It came about as a result of negotiations between the Americans and two military figures from Vichy France whom the Americans believed could assure safe passage for the landing forces, namely Henri Giraud and François Darlan.

Giraud was contacted first, and spoke with General Dwight Eisenhower in his military headquarters in Gibraltar, but negotiations were slowed when Giraud demanded too much. Meanwhile, the Americans contacted Vichy official Admiral François Darlan, who happened to be in Algiers, who made a deal with the Allies not to oppose the landings in exchange for being named High Commissioner. This was accepted, and the military-civilian body was first called the High Commission of France in Africa (Haut-commissariat de France en Afrique). The name "Civil and Military High Command" was adopted later by Giraud, who succeeded Darlan after the latter was assassinated on 24 December 1942.

The Commission exercised authority over French Algeria, the French Protectorate of Morocco, the French Protectorate of Tunisia (after its evacuation by the Germans and Italians in May 1943) and French West Africa. In June of the same year, the High Commission merged with the French National Committee, the governing body of Free France, giving birth to the French National Liberation Committee.

The question of loyalties and allegiance was a complex one. Darlan was Minister of the Navy under Philippe Petain and part of the Vichy regime subjugated to Germany, but made a deal with the Allies to allow free passage during Operation Torch in exchange for being named High Commissioner. The French population of North Africa was divided among supporters of Vichy, Gaullists, and others. By the time the Civil and Military High Command merged in 1943, it was in support of de Gaulle and Free France.

== Terminology ==
The French Civil and Military High Command was first known as the "High Commission of France in Africa" ("Haut-commissariat de France en Afrique)". It was also known as the "French High Command" (Commandement en chef français) or the "Civil and Military Command of Algiers" (Commandement civil et militaire d'Alger).

== Background ==
Unlike Britain, who had supported General de Gaulle and Free France from the beginning of the War, the Americans had not, and maintained contact with and recognized the Vichy France government. For this reason, when the Allies began to plan the invasion of North Africa, which was under Vichy control, the American army was given the task, rather than the British, who stayed in the background.

The Americans were planning the last details of the imminent landings in North Africa as part of Operation Torch. Nominally under control of Vichy France as the entire French colonial Empire was, the situation on the ground in North Africa was complex, with differing loyalties among the French and other population there, including both supporters of Vichy, supporters of de Gaulle's Free France, and others. The Americans were in negotiations trying to find a way to ensure that the landings would not be opposed, and that they would have free passage thereafter in North Africa.

The new post, based in Algiers and initially called "High Commission of France in Africa" came about as a result of negotiations between the Americans and two military figures from Vichy France who the Americans believed could assure safe passage for the American landing forces of Operation Torch, namely Henri Giraud and François Darlan.

=== Henri Giraud ===
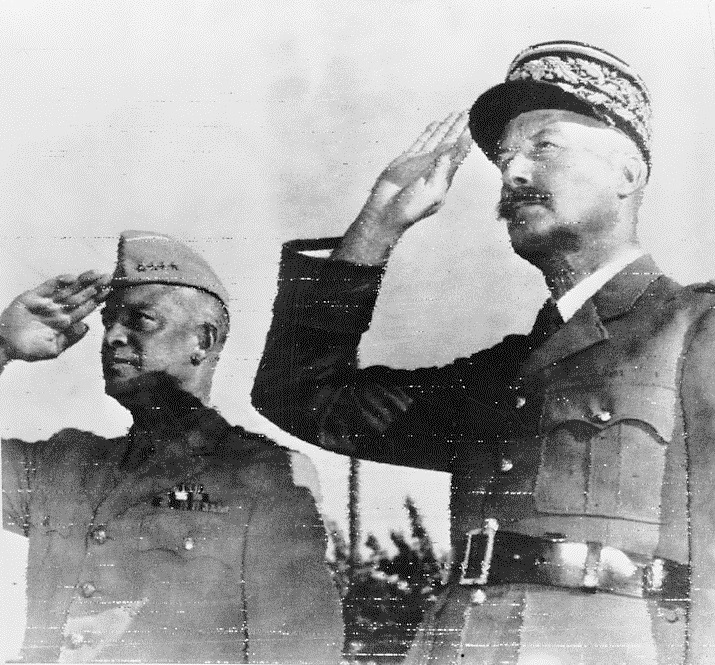
General Dwight D. Eisenhower and General Henri Giraud saluting the flags of both nations at Allied headquarters (1943)

At the outset of World War II, Henri Giraud was a member of the French Superior War Council, and disagreed with Charles de Gaulle about the tactics of using armored troops. Giraud became commander of the 7th Army when it was sent to the Netherlands on 10 May 1940, and was captured by the Germans. He escaped in April 1942 and managed to slip back into what was by then the collaborationist Vichy France regime. He tried to persuade Vichy leader Marshall Philippe Pétain that Germany would lose and that France should resist German occupation. His views were rejected, but he was not returned to the Germans. Giraud's escape became known all over France. Giraud remained loyal to Pétain and the Vichy government, but refused to cooperate with the Germans. Heinrich Himmler tried to have him assassinated.

Giraud was secretly contacted by the Allies, who were preparing the invasion of North Africa. Giraud was already planning for the day when American troops landed in France, and agreed to support an Allied landing in French North Africa, provided that only American troops were used; like many other French officers he was bitterly resentful of the British, particularly after their attack on Mers-el-Kébir, and that he or another French officer was the commander of such an operation. He considered this latter condition essential to maintaining French sovereignty over North Africa.

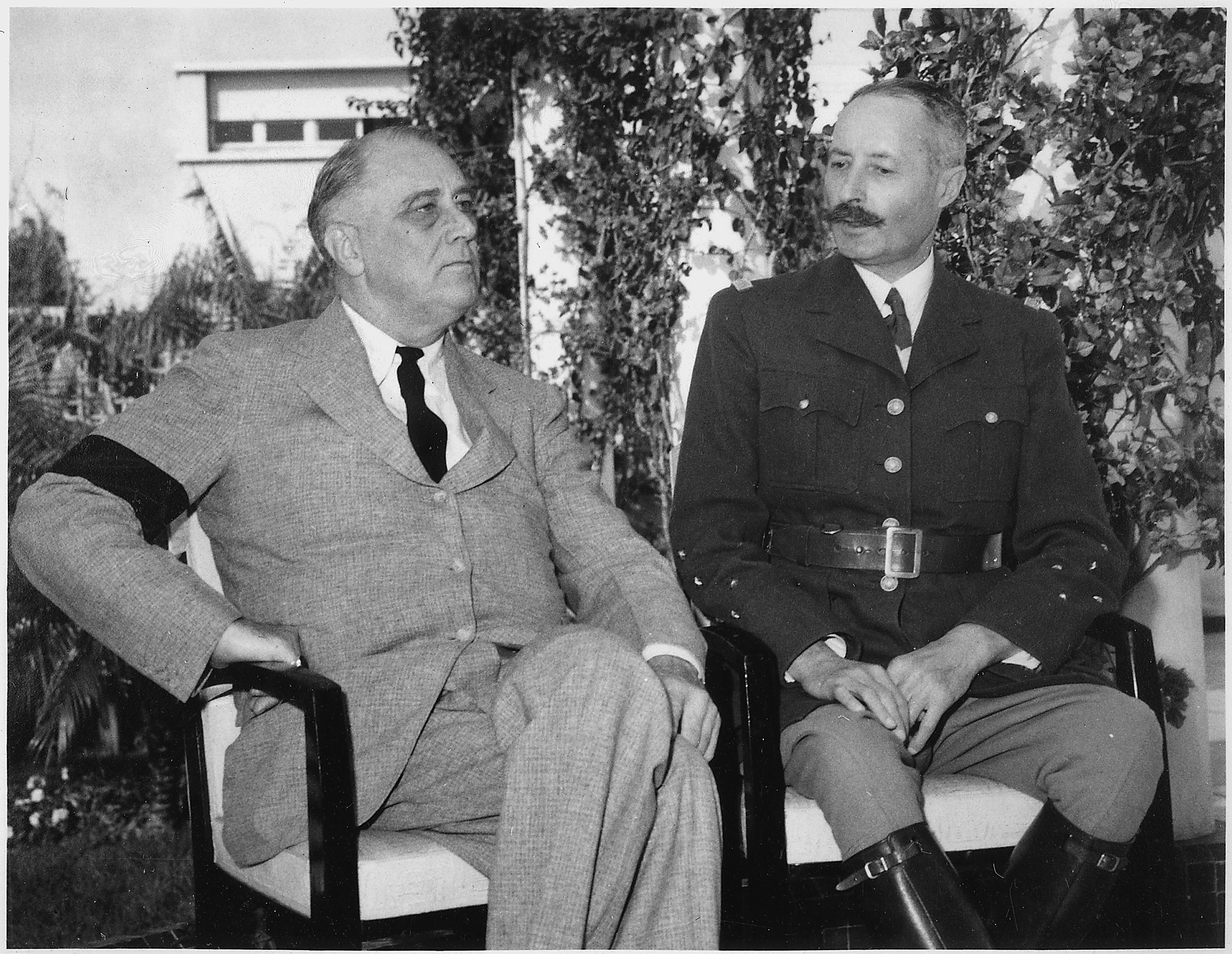
President Franklin D. Roosevelt and Giraud (19 Jan. 1943)

The invasion was agreed on at a secret meeting on 23 October with U.S. General Mark W. Clark and diplomat Robert Daniel Murphy, but the Americans promised only that Giraud would be in command "as soon as possible". Still in France, Giraud responded with a demand for a written commitment that he would be commander within 48 hours of the landing, and for landings in France as well as North Africa. General Dwight Eisenhower advised that he should be brought to his Torch operational headquarters in Gibraltar, and on 5 November, Giraud was picked up near Toulon by the British submarine HMS Seraph, arriving on 7 November, only a few hours before the landings. Eisenhower asked Giraud to assume command of French troops in North Africa during Operation Torch and order them to join the Allies. But Giraud had expected to command the whole Allied operation, and adamantly refused to participate on any other basis. He said "his honor would be tarnished" and that he would only be a spectator in the affair.

While Giraud dithered in Gibraltar, a last minute overture to a compatriot of Giraud bore fruit in Algiers.

=== François Darlan ===
To bring a quick end to the resistance and secure French co-operation, the Allies came to an agreement with Darlan, who as commander-in-chief could give the necessary orders. Dwight D. Eisenhower, the Allied commander on the spot recognized Darlan as commander of all French forces in the area and recognized his self-nomination as High Commissioner of France in Africa (head of civil government) for North and West Africa on 14 November. In return, on 10 November, Darlan ordered all French forces to join the Allies. His order was obeyed; not only in French North Africa, but also by the Vichy forces in French West Africa with its potentially useful facilities at Dakar.

== History ==
Philippe Pétain and the Vichy regime ordered Admiral François Darlan to oppose to the allied landings in North Africa of early November 1942. After a few days, Darlan realized the reality of the balance of power and switched to the Allied camp. On 13 November, Darlan was recognized as "High Commissioner of France in North Africa" by General Eisenhower.

But on 24 December 1942, Fernand Bonnier de La Chapelle, one of the 7 November activists enlisted in the Corps Francs d'Afrique in World War II, shot Darlan. He was executed, after a summary trial, on 26 December. The greatest confusion reigned. Supporters of the count of Paris, including Henri d'Astier de la Vigerie, attempted to promote the accession to power of the Orléanist pretender to the throne of France.

On 26 December, General Giraud was elected High Commissioner by the members of an "Imperial Council" created by Darlan after proclaiming himself High Commissioner in France and Africa (though this was rejected by Vichy). The candidacy of the "Count of Paris" does not seem to have been considered. That of Charles Noguès, preferred by the Vichystes and whom Giraud would later affirm that he thought of supporting for a while, did not meet with the approval of the Americans and British because of his attitude during Operation Torch. By an order of 5 February 1943, Giraud took the title of "Civil and Military Commander-in-Chief ". The Journal officiel of the French High Commission in Africa was replaced, as of 20 February, by that of the French Civil and Military High Command. Giraud signed his decrees and orders, as "General of the Army, and French Civil and Military Commander in Chief". (Note: Giraud title signature: Le général d'armée, commandant en chef français, civil et militaire)

Giraud exercised authority over French Algeria and the French Protectorate of Morocco, while the Tunisian campaign against the Germans and Italians continued in the French Protectorate of Tunisia. Darlan having previously won the support of French West Africa, the latter was also in Giraud's camp, while French Equatorial Africa was in de Gaulle's camp.

Giraud kept a number of Darlan's employees at his side. Several of the Vichy laws continued for a while, tolerated by the United States despite the protests of General Charles de Gaulle. On 30 December, Bergeret had several people arrested, most of them Gaullists, who had participated in the Allied operations of 8 November "as a preventive measure". Under allied pressure, the twelve Gaullists arrested were gradually freed, as were the twenty-seven communist deputies previously interned in Algeria in March 1941. On 20 January, Giraud appointed Marcel Peyrouton, former Vichy Minister of the Interior and actor in the abrogation of the Crémieux Decree to the post of Governor General.

At the beginning of March 1943, several measures heralded a distancing from Vichy. The images of Philippe Pétain and allusions to the Vichy government gradually disappeared from public buildings and official documents. These developments were accelerated by the arrival, at the beginning of March, of Jean Monnet, sent by Franklin Delano Roosevelt to support Giraud. On 14 March, Giraud delivered a speech that he later described as "the first democratic speech of [his] life", in which he broke with Vichy by affirming that the Armistice of 22 June 1940 did not commit France and that the legislation promulgated since then was null and void.

Jean Monnet pushed Giraud to negotiate with de Gaulle after having made initial contact with him at the Casablanca Conference. Several parts of the Vichyist legislation were gradually abandoned. Giraud refused, however, to go back on the repeal of the Crémieux Decree, which would result in restoring French citizenship to the Jews of Algeria, considering that "in North Africa, Jews should not be considered any different from Muslims. They are indigenous people practicing a religion different from that of their neighbors, and nothing else." The decree wasn't reinstated until October. De Gaulle arrived in Algiers on 30 May 1943. On 3 June, the Civil and Military High Command in Algiers merged with the French National Committee in London to form the French National Liberation Committee.

== See also ==
- Brazzaville Conference
- Allies of World War II
- Charles de Gaulle
- Clandestine press of the French Resistance
- Collaboration with the Axis Powers during World War II
- Empire Defense Council
- Foreign policy of Charles de Gaulle
- Foreign relations of Vichy France
- Free France
- French Liberation Army
- French Resistance
- French Colonial Empire
- French Fourth Republic
- French Third Republic
- German occupation of France
- Italian occupation of France during World War II
- Liberation of France
- Liberation of Paris
- List of French possessions and colonies
- List of governors-general of French Equatorial Africa
- Military history of France during World War II
- Philippe Pétain
- Provisional Government of the French Republic
- Rene Bousquet
- Vichy France
- Vichy French Air Force
- Vichy Holocaust collaboration timeline
- Zone libre

== Works cited ==
- Cantier, Jacques (2002). L'Algérie sous le régime de Vichy [Algeria Under the Vichy Regime] (in French). Odile Jacob. ISBN 978-2738-11057-2.
- Churchill, Winston (1951). The Second World War, Vol 3: The Hinge of Fate.
- Duval, Eugène-Jean Duval (2009). Aux sources officielles de la colonisation françaises – Tome 2, Vers la décolonisation : 1940-2009 (in French). Harmattan.
- Eisenhower, Dwight (1948). Crusade in Europe. New York: Doubleday. pp. 99–105, 107–110.
- Funk, Arthur L. (April 1973). "Negotiating the Deal with Darlan". Journal of Contemporary History. 8 (2): 81–117. doi:10.1177/002200947300800205. JSTOR 259995. S2CID 159589846.
- Gilbert, Martin (1986). Road to Victory: Winston S. Churchill 1941–1945. London: Guild Publishing.
- Groom, Winston (3 April 2006). 1942: The Year That Tried Men's Souls. New York: Grove Press. p. 354. ISBN 978-0-8021-4250-4. "After the formalities were concluded, the first thing that Giraud announced to Eisenhower—through an interpreter, since he spoke no English—was that he expected to be in supreme command of all Allied forces in North Africa. He had even brought with him detailed plans for defeating... [(back translation from French:) the Germans, as well as for the Liberation of France. Eisenhower, surprised, offered Giraud the command of all French forces in North Africa, but wasn't ready to offer him his own job, not least because the invasion was scheduled for the following day. For his part, Giraud persisted, sulked, and threatened to not support the Allies at all.]"
- Harding, Stephen (2013). The Last Battle: When US and German soldiers joined forces in the waning hours of World War II in Europe. Da Capo Press. ISBN 9780306822087.
- Levisse-Touzé, Christine (1998). L'Afrique du Nord dans la guerre, 1939-1945 [North Africa During the War] (in French). Paris: Albin Michel. ISBN 978-2226-10069-6. OCLC 39476140.
- Maury, Jean-Pierre (2006). "Gouvernement de la Libération" (in French). Perpignan: Digithèque MJP, University of Perpignan.
- Maury, Jean-Pierre (2010). "Le Commandement en chef civil et militaire" (in French). Perpignan: Digithèque MJP, University of Perpignan.
- Melton, George (1998). Darlan: Admiral and Statesman of France 1881–1942. Westport, CT: Praeger. ISBN 0-275-95973-2.
- Montagnon, Pierre (1990). La France coloniale : Retour à l'Hexagone [Colonial France: Return to the Hexagon] (in French). Vol. 2. Pygmalion. ISBN 978-2-7564-0938-2.
- Murphy, Robert (1964). Diplomat Among Warriors. New York: Doubleday. pp. 115–122.
- Nyrop, Richard; American University (Washington, D.C.). Foreign Areas Studies Division United States. Army (1965). U.S. Army Area Handbook for Algeria. Division, Special Operations Research Office, American University. OCLC 1085291500. "Most of the European colonial population of Algeria wholeheartedly supported the Vichy government. ... Even after the Allies under General Dwight D. Eisenhower liberated Algeria in November 1942, General Henri Giraud, appointed by Eisenhower as civil and military commander in chief, only slowly rescinded the Vichy legislation. It was almost a year before the Crémieux decrees were reactivated, against the virulent opposition of the European colonialists."
- Price, G. Ward (1944). Giraud and the African Scene. New York: Macmillan.
- Salinas, Alfred (2013). "3. La bataille d'Alger" [Battle of Algiers]. Les Américains en Algérie 1942-1945 [Americans in Algeria 1942-1945] (in French). Paris: Harmattan. ISBN 978-2-296-51535-2.
