= French National Committee =

French government in exile during Second World War

- committee of Free France
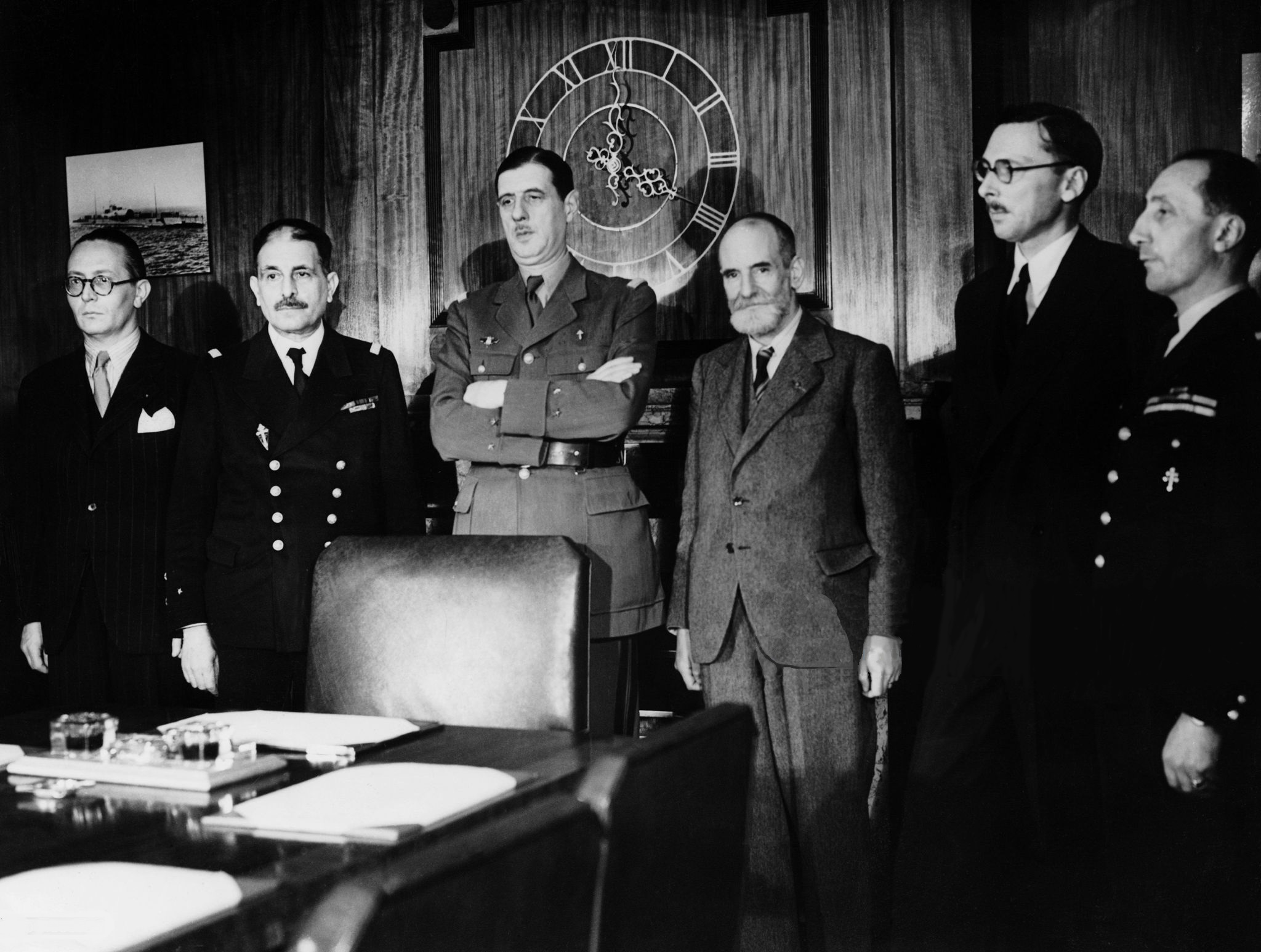
- left to right: Diethelm, Muselier, De Gaulle, Cassin, Pleven and Auboyneau.
- Date formed: 24 September 1941
- Date dissolved: 3 June 1943

People and organisations
- CNFL President: Charles de Gaulle
- Deputy head of government: René Pleven
- Status in legislature: none
- Opposition cabinet: Government of Vichy France
- Opposition party: French State
- Opposition leader: Philippe Pétain

History
- Predecessor: Empire Defense Council
- Successor: French Committee of National Liberation

The French National Committee (French: Comité national français, CNF) was the coordinating body created by General Charles de Gaulle which acted as the government in exile of Free France from 1941 to 1943. The committee was the successor of the smaller Empire Defense Council.

It was Winston Churchill who suggested that de Gaulle create a committee, in order to lend an appearance of more constitutionally based and less dictatorial authority. According to historian Henri Bernard, De Gaulle went on to accept his proposal, but took care to exclude all his adversaries within the Free France movement, such as Émile Muselier, André Labarthe and others, retaining only "yes men" in the group.

The CNF was founded 24 September 1941 by an edict signed by General de Gaulle in London. The committee remained active until 3 June 1943, when it merged with the French Civil and Military High Command headed by Henri Giraud, becoming the new French Committee of National Liberation.

== Composition ==
The French National Committee comprised six civilian and six military personnel:

- Brigadier General Charles de Gaulle, President;
- René Pleven, Commissioner of Economy, Finance and the Colonies. In charge of the coordination of civilian administrative departments;
- Major General Paul Legentilhomme, Commissioner of War;
- Maurice Dejean, Commissioner of Foreign Affairs until October 18, 1942 (dismissal), interim replacement by Pleven and then by René Massigli;
- René Cassin, Commissioner of Justice and Public Instruction;
- André Diethelm, Commissioner for Action in the Metropolis, Work, and Information;
- André Philip, Commissioner of the Interior from 27;
- Jacques Soustelle, Commissioner of Information from July 27, 1942;
- Air Brigade General Martial Valin, Commissioner of the Air Force;
- Vice-Admiral Émile Muselier, Commissioner of the Navy and the Merchant Navy, until March 3, 1942 (resignation); replaced by Rear Admiral Philippe Auboyneau from 4;
- Lieutenant General Georges Catroux, commissioner at large from March 4, 1942;
- Rear Admiral Georges Thierry d'Argenlieu, commissioner at large from March 4, 1942.

On 20 March 1943, the committee secretly appointed Jean Moulin, then in London, as representative of the French National Committee in Metropolitan France and "national commissioner on active duty" (Note: National commissioner on active duty: in French: "commissaire national en mission".) and put him in charge of creating a single coordinating body for the French Resistance. According to Daniel Cordier, "Jean Moulin was then becoming one of the main characters of the French internal Resistance.

== See also ==
- Brazzaville Conference
- Allies of World War II
- Collaboration with the Axis Powers during World War II
- Foreign policy of Charles de Gaulle
- Foreign relations of Vichy France
- Free French Africa
- French Resistance
- French Colonial Empire
- French Fourth Republic
- French Third Republic
- Liberation of France
- Liberation of Paris
- List of French possessions and colonies
- List of governors-general of French Equatorial Africa
- Military history of France during World War II
- Philippe Pétain
- Provisional Government of the French Republic
- Vichy France
- Vichy French Air Force
- Zone libre

== Works cited ==
- Bernard, Henri [in French] (1984) [1st pub: Collins (1981)]. "Kersaudy (François). Churchill and de Gaulle [compte-rendu]". Revue belge de philologie et d'histoire (book review) (in French). 62 (2).
- Cordier, Daniel (27 May 2014) [1st pub: Gallimard (1999)]. Jean Moulin - La République des catacombes [Jean Moulin - The Republic of the Catacombs] (in French). Editions Gallimard. ISBN 978-2-07-255962-4. OCLC 751486421.
- Cornil, Sylvain (16 February 2009). "Les institutions de la France Libre" [Institutions of Free France]. La Fondation de la France Libre.
- Journal officiel de la France libre [Official Journal of Free France].
