= Bank of Central African States =

Supranational central bank in Africa

Bank of Central African States Banque des États de l'Afrique centrale (BEAC)
- Logo of the BEAC

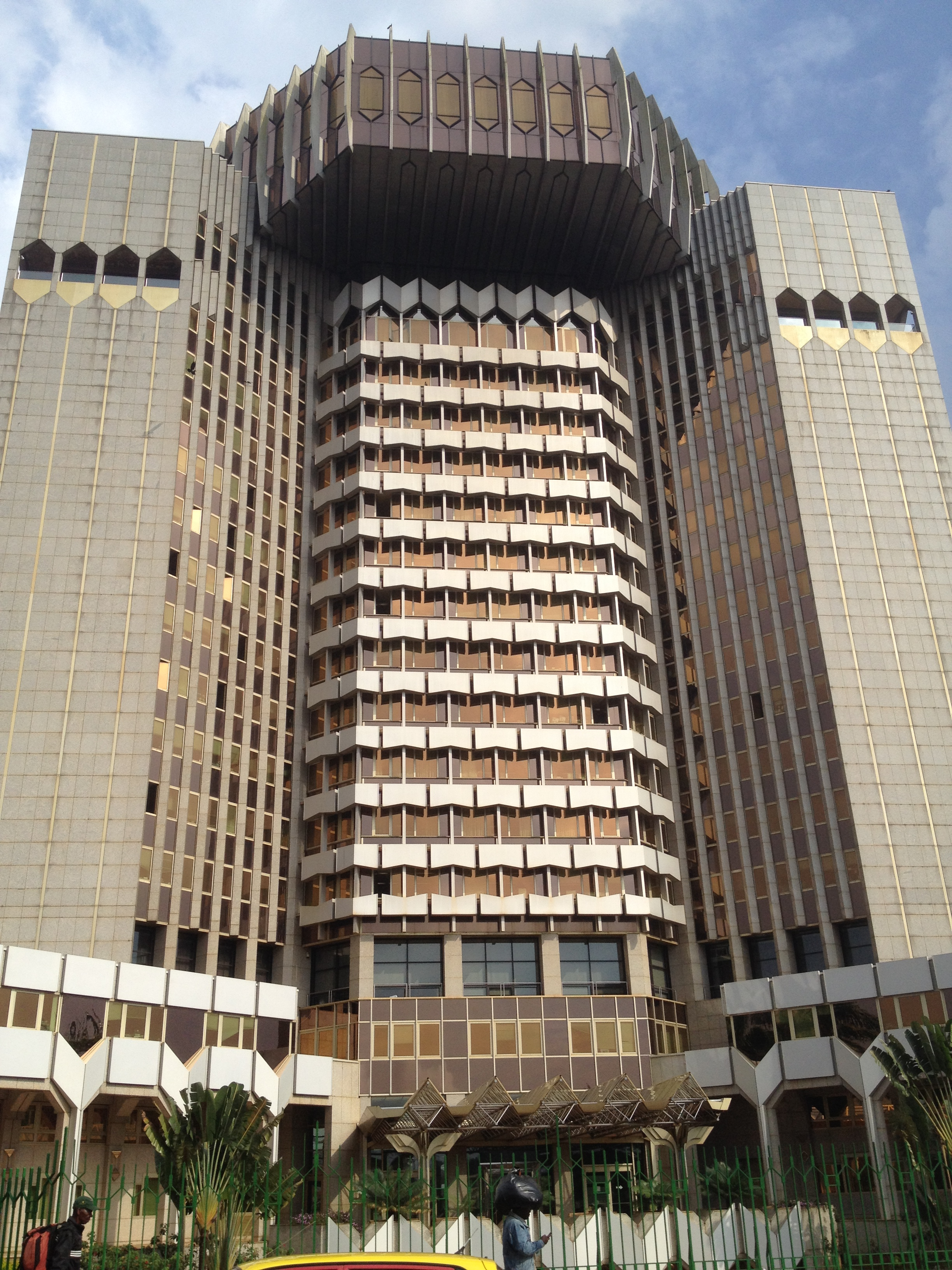
- Headquarters of the BEAC
- Central bank of: Economic and Monetary Community of Central Africa
- Headquarters: Yaoundé, Cameroon
- Established: 1972
- Governor: Yvon Sana Bangui
- Currency: Central African CFA franc XAF (ISO 4217)
- Reserves: 9.79 billion USD
- Preceded by: Banque Centrale des États de l'Afrique Equatoriale et du Cameroun
- Website: beac.int

BEAC is the central bank of the states in red.

The Bank of Central African States (French: Banque des États de l'Afrique centrale, BEAC; Spanish: Banco de los Estados de África Central) is a central bank that serves six central African countries which form the Economic and Monetary Community of Central Africa: Cameroon, Central African Republic, Chad, Equatorial Guinea, Gabon, and the Republic of the Congo.

== History ==
=== Background ===
In 1920, the French government expanded the note-issuance privilege of the Banque de l'Afrique Occidentale to its central African colonies of Congo, Ubangi-Shari, Gabon, Chad, and later Cameroon. This arrangement was disrupted during World War II, as the colonies controlled by Free France became Free French Africa. The Caisse Centrale de la France Libre was established in London in December 1941 to manage the regional currency, and was renamed Caisse Centrale de la France d'Outre-Mer (CCFOM) in 1944. The region's currency was standardized in late 1945 as the CFA Franc.

In 1955, the French government transferred the CCFOM's monetary role in the colonies of French Equatorial Africa to a new entity, the Institut d'Émission de l'Afrique Équatoriale Française et du Cameroun, which in 1959 was renamed the Banque Centrale des États de l'Afrique Équatoriale et du Cameroun (BCEAEC) after it became clear that the colonies would soon become independent nations. The BCEAEC, headquartered in Paris, acted as the new countries' joint central bank throughout the 1960s and early 1970s, similarly as its sister entity the BCEAO for the former colonies of French West Africa.

=== Establishment and development ===
On 22 November 1972, the five countries gathered in Brazzaville signed cooperation conventions between themselves and with France that formed the basis for their continued use of the CFA Franc, rebranded as standing for "Coopération Financière en Afrique" instead of "Communauté française d'Afrique". Under these agreements, the BEAC was established to succeed the BCEAEC and manage the joint currency, with a convertibility guarantee provided by the French Treasury. On 1 February 1973, the member states met in Fort-Lamy and decided to locate the new institution in Cameroon. The BEAC held its first board meeting on 13 March 1973 and started operations on 2 April 1973. The full transfer of head office activity from Paris to Yaoundé was completed in early 1977.

Equatorial Guinea joined the currency arrangement and BEAC on 1 January 1985.

On 16 October 1990, following similar reform pioneered by the BCEAO earlier the same year, the member states decided to pool their banking supervision and created the Central African Banking Commission (COBAC) for that purpose within the BEAC. On 17 January 1992, a follow-up agreement harmonized banking regulation in the region, paving the way for the effective establishment of the COBAC in January 1993.

The BEAC's statutes were revised in late 1999, and again in 2010, to grant it greater independence.

== Organization and governance ==
The BEAC has main branches known as National Directorates (French: direction nationale) in the capital or largest city of each of the member states. The BEAC also has branches in Bafoussam and Garoua (Cameroon), Berberati (CAR), Abéché and Moundou (Chad), Ouesso and Pointe-Noire (Congo), Bata (Equatorial Guinea), Franceville, Oyem, and Port-Gentil (Gabon).

As of 2019, the BEAC is governed by a Board of Directors (French: Conseil d'administration). Its highest monetary policy making body is the Monetary Policy Committee (MPC, French: Comité de politique monétaire). The MPC consists of the Governor, two representatives of the French Government, and two representatives from each of the six CEMAC member states, one of which is the BEAC National Director for the country.

== Buildings ==
The buildings of the National Directorates typically dominate the local skyline, respectively inaugurated in Bangui (1979), Libreville (1981), Yaoundé (1982), and N'Djamena (1994). In Malabo, the BEAC took over the former building of the Bank of Equatorial Guinea in July 1985. The BEAC's current head office tower in Yaoundé was inaugurated in 1988. In Paris, the BEAC was located on 29, rue du Colisée, together with the BCEAO, until it moved its representative office to another location in 2007.

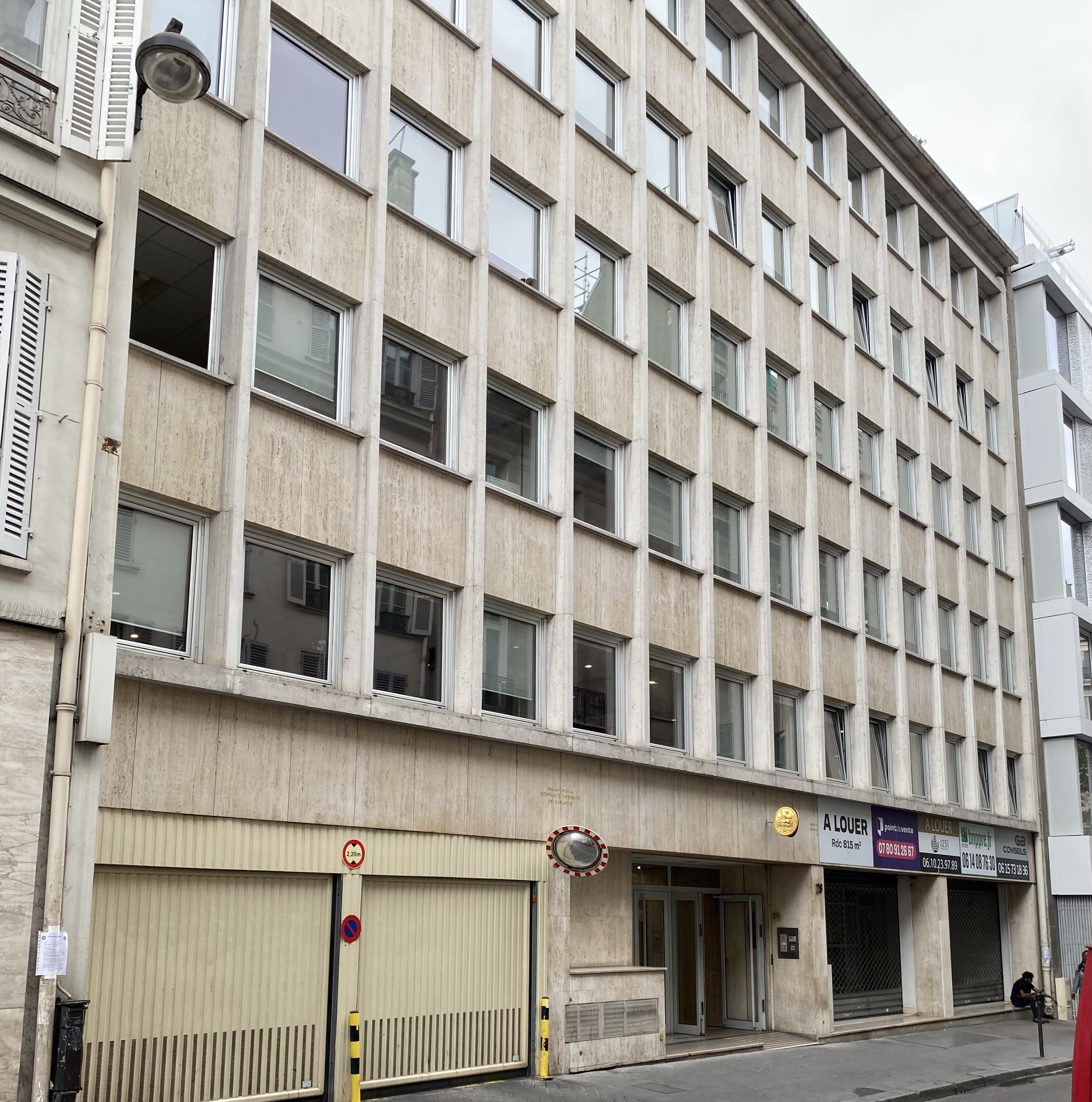
Building at 29, rue du Colisée in Paris, seat of the BCEAEC then BEAC in the 1960s and 1970s

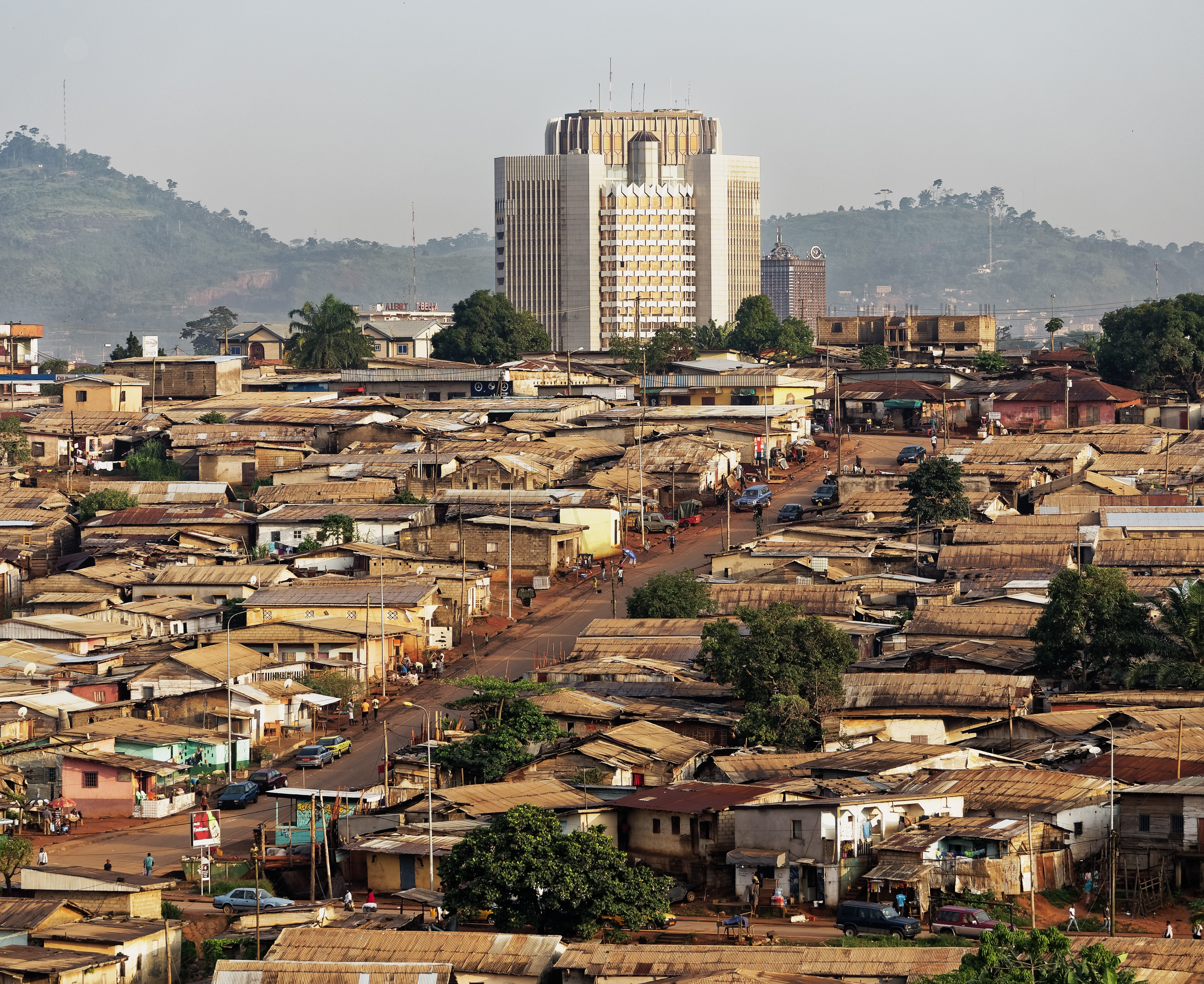
BEAC Tower in Yaounde

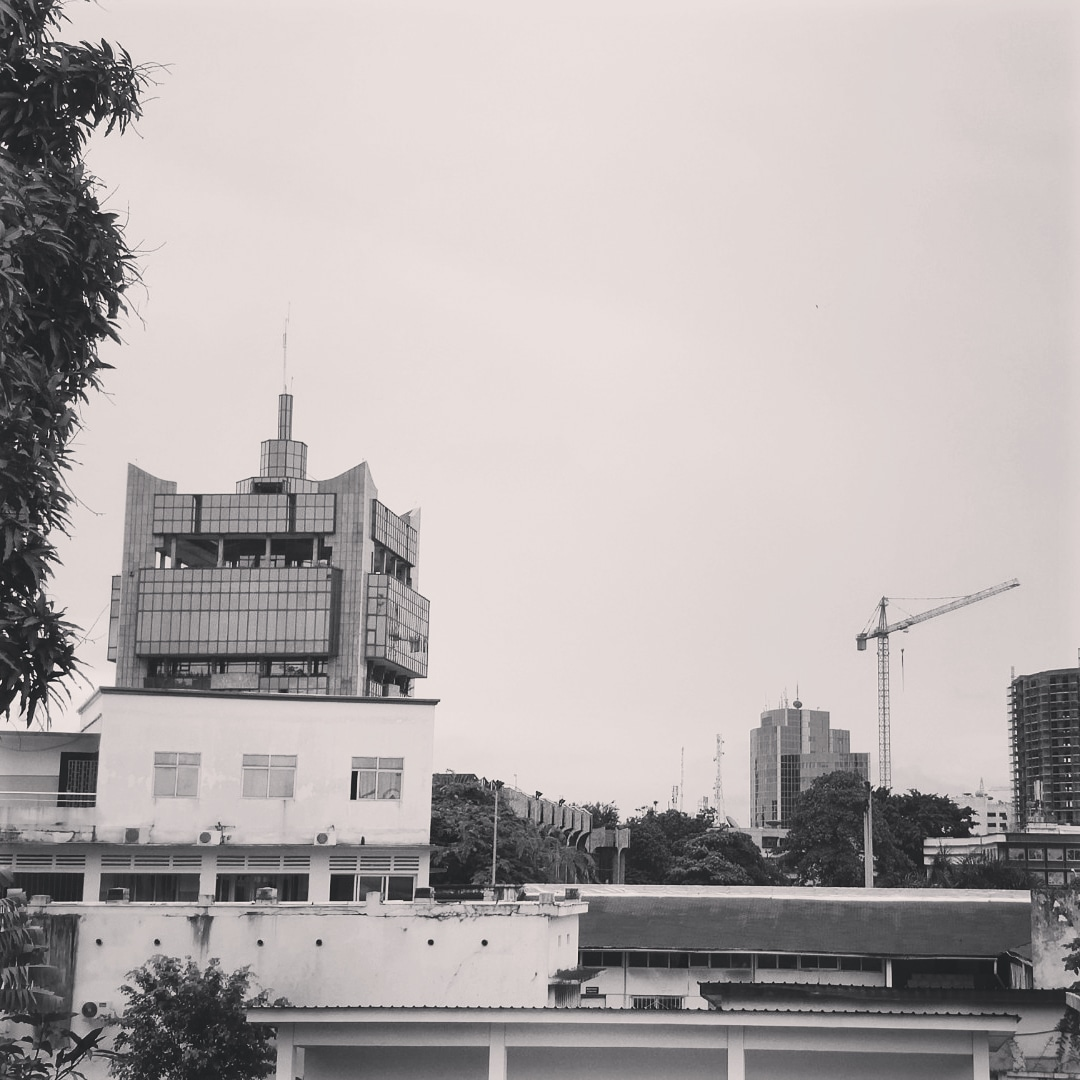
BEAC tower in Brazzaville

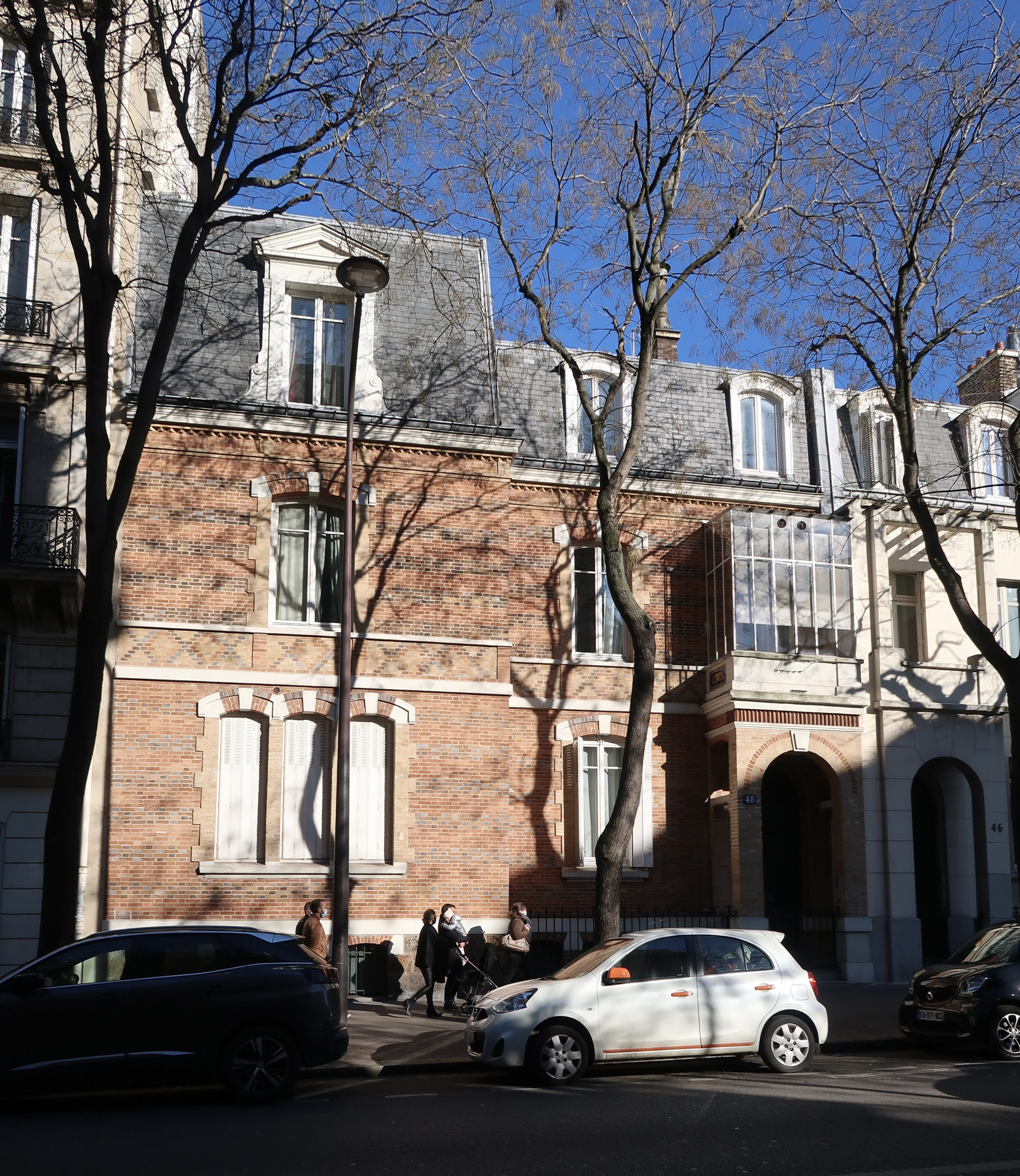
48, avenue Raymond-Poincaré, the Paris office of BEAC

== Governors ==
- Casimir Oyé-Mba (1978–1990)
- Jean-Félix Mamalepot (1990–2007)
- Philibert Andzembe (2007 – June 2010)
- Lucas Abaga Nchama (2010–2017)
- Abbas Mahamat Tolli (2017–2024)
- Yvon Sana Bangui (2024–2031)

Christian Joudiou, a French national, was the General Manager (French: directeur général) of the BEAC from 1973 to 1978.

== Controversy ==
Philibert Andzembe of Gabon was Governor of the BEAC from July 2007 until October 2009, when he was fired by the new president of Gabon, Ali Bongo, in response to a bank scandal in which $28.3 million went missing from the bank's Paris branch. In December 2010, a leaked diplomatic cable dated 3 June 2005 said that Gabonese officials working for the Bank of Central African States stole US$36 million over a period of five years from the pooled reserves, giving much of the money to members of France's two main political parties.

== See also ==
- Central African Financial Market Supervisory Commission
- Central Bank of West African States (BCEAO)
- CFA Franc
- Central African CFA franc
- Central banks and currencies of Africa
- List of central banks
