= Empire Defense Council =

Free French political body

- Cabinet of French colonial empire loyal to Free France

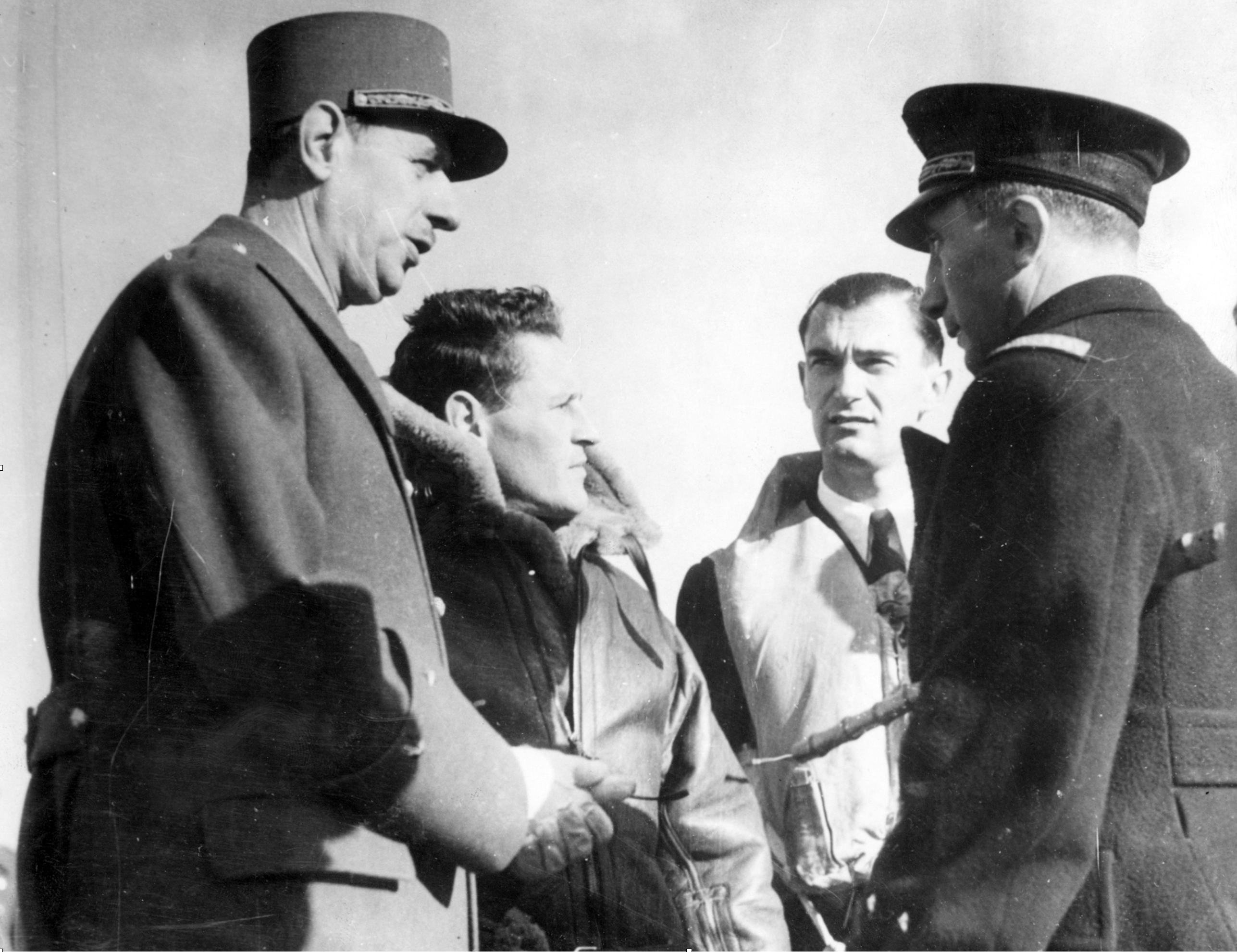
- Date formed: 27 October 1940
- Date dissolved: 24 September 1941

People and organisations
- Head of government: Charles de Gaulle

History
- Successor: French National Committee

The Empire Defense Council (French: Conseil de défense de l'Empire) was a deliberative body established within Free France in 1940. It was subsequently replaced by the French National Committee.

== Creation and legitimacy ==
On 26 June 1940, four days after the Pétain government requested the armistice, General de Gaulle submitted a memorandum to the British government notifying Churchill of his decision to set up a Council of Defense of the Empire and formalizing the agreement reached with Churchill on 28 June, which allowed the Free French forces to be recognized as a fully-fledged French authority by the British government: in the eyes of the British government, General de Gaulle was then the "Head of the French who are continuing the war". This memorandum led to an agreement on 7 August, but provided for the creation of a French Committee or Council as of 26 June.

The agreement of 7 August between de Gaulle and the UK, known as the "Chequers agreement", gave General de Gaulle all the financial independence and resources of a government in exile. The British government considered it to have taken effect 11 July 1940, the day Marshal Pétain took full powers and signed into law the end of the Third Republic. By this act, the British government wished to indicate that it recognized that Free France, still being formed at the time, was the legitimate successor to the Republic that had just died, and was an ally of the United Kingdom in the war. It also undertook to reconstitute the entire French territory and "the greatness of France" after the war was over.

The formal recognition of the Empire Defense Council as a de facto government in exile by the United Kingdom took place on 6 January 1941; recognition by the Soviet Union was published in December 1941, by exchange of letters.

== Geographical base ==
In his view, General de Gaulle was ensuring the continuity of the rule of law and national defense against the Axis powers. This was made possible by the legitimacy he obtained from his appeal of 18 June, as well as by the rapid rallying of military units and French territories that wished to continue the fight (from 22 June, in the case of the Franco-British territory of New Hebrides).

De Gaulle's support grew out of a base in colonial Africa. In the fall of 1940, the colonial empire largely supported the Vichy regime. Félix Éboué, governor of Chad, switched his support to General de Gaulle in September. Encouraged, de Gaulle traveled to Brazzaville in October, where he announced the formation of the Empire Defense Council in the Brazzaville Manifesto, and invited all colonies still supporting Vichy to join him and the Free French forces in the fight against Germany, which most of them did by 1943.

At the time, Free France had the bulk of its territorial base in its colonial empire, thanks to the rallying of various colonies : French India was the first to rally, followed by most of the territories of French Equatorial Africa, followed by the New Hebrides Condominium, French Polynesia and New Caledonia. Félix Éboué, governor of Chad, announced his support on August 26. He quickly received the support of Edgard de Larminat, Pierre Koenig and Philippe Leclerc. At the end of the summer, most of French Equatorial Africa, newly designated "Free French Africa", was in support of Free France.

== Government of Free France ==
On 27 October 1940, General de Gaulle announced the creation of the Empire Defense Council as the decision-making body of Free France in the "Brazzaville Manifesto", from the capital of French Equatorial Africa. This was part of his strategy to give the movement a political as well as a military character, both to attract supporters, and to provide support for his claim as a political as well as military leader of the French resistance.

In the ordinances of 27 October 1940, De Gaulle defined the powers of the council, including: external and internal security, economic activity, negotiating with foreign powers (in article 2), as well as the "establishment of organs that would exercise the powers of jurisdiction normally devolved to the Council of State and the Court of Cassation" (article 4). However, the decision-making power rested with the head of the Free French (article 3), the Council exercising only an advisory role. Ministerial powers were exercised "by agency directors appointed by the Head of the Free French". This gave the Defense Council the nature of a consultative and representative body in the territories that joined with it. The Administrative Conference of the Free French (Conférence administrative de la France Libre), created by decree of 29 January 1941, served as the government, bringing together all the agency directors and the members of the Empire Defence Council.

== Leadership ==
The members of the council were chosen by Charles de Gaulle because they "already exercise authority on French lands or symbolize the highest intellectual and moral values of the nation." (Brazzaville Manifesto)

- General Georges Catroux
- Vice-Admiral Émile Muselier
- General Edgard de Larminat
- Governor Félix Éboué
- Governor Henri Sautot
- Colonel Philippe Leclerc de Hauteclocque
- Médecin-Général Adolphe Sicé
- Permanent secretary René Cassin
- Naval captain Georges Thierry d'Argenlieu

== See also ==
- Allies of World War II
- Brazzaville Conference
- Collaboration with the Axis Powers
- Foreign relations of Vichy France
- France–Germany border
- Free France
- Free French Forces
- French Colonial Empire
- French Forces of the Interior
- French Indochina in World War II
- French Fourth Republic
- French prisoners of war in World War II
- French Resistance
- French Third Republic
- Military Administration in France
- German occupation of France during World War II
- Italian occupation of France during World War II
- Liberation of France
- Liberation of Paris
- List of French divisions in World War II
- List of French possessions and colonies
- List of governors-general of French Equatorial Africa
- Military history of France during World War II
- Pacific Islands home front during World War II
- Provisional Government of the French Republic
- The Vichy 80
- Vichy France
- Vichy Holocaust collaboration timeline
- Zone libre
