= Abbas Tolli =

Chadian central banker and economist

Abbas Mahamat Tolli
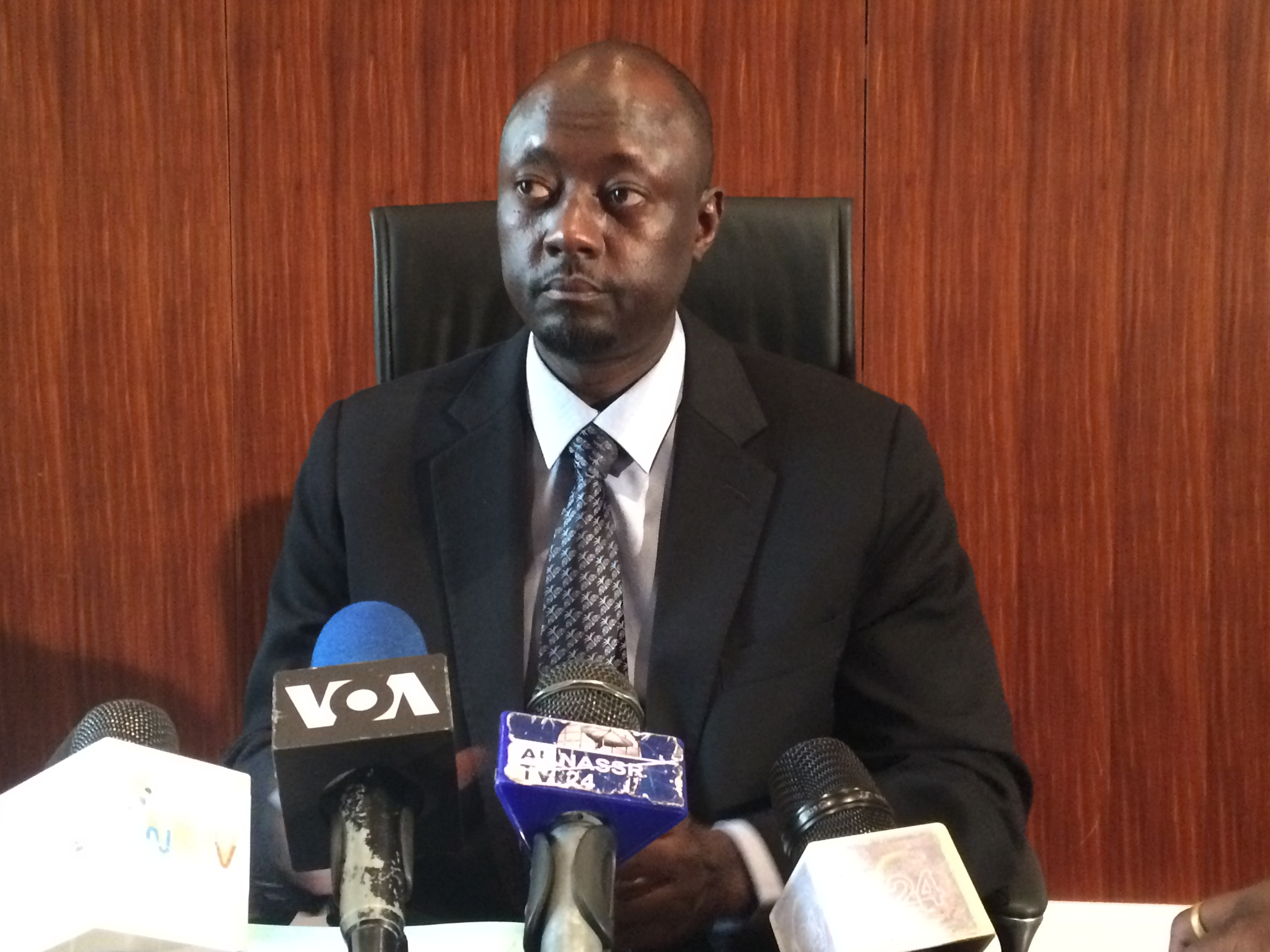

5th Governor of Bank of Central African States
- In office 6 February 2017 – 6 February 2024
- Vice Governor: Dieudonné Evou Mekou; Michel Dzombala
- Preceded by: Lucas Abaga Nchama
- Succeeded by: Yvon Sana Bangui

Minister of Finance and Budget of Chad
- In office 2005–2008
- Preceded by: Gata Ngoulou
- Succeeded by: Ngeyam Djaibe

Personal details
- Born: April 1972 (age 54) Abéché, Chad

Abbas Mahamat Tolli is an economist who served as the 5th Governor of the Bank of Central African States from February 2017 to February 2024.

== Background and education ==
Tolli was born in Abéché, Chad, in 1972. He holds a degree in Business Administration from the University of Quebec.

== Career ==
- 2001-03: Director-General of the Customs Department
- 2003-05: Director, Office of the President
- 2005 Secretary of State for Finance
- 2005-08: Minister of Finance and Budget of Chad
- 2008-10: Secretary-General, BEAC
- 2011-12: Minister of Infrastructure
- 2012: Secretary-General, COBAC. Tolli oversaw the introduction of a new IT master plan, as well as introducing new banking regulations, notably new capital requirements and new internal control procedures.
- 2015-16: President, BDEAC: in 2015, the regional bank supervisor, the COBAC, conducted an audit that showed that the Bank's resources were insufficient to meet its loan commitments. An interim action plan was approved by the BDEAC Board of Directors in December 2015. The Action Plan included the modernization of the BDEAC's software and accounting systems; a capital increase; modernizing the governance structure and recruiting new staff; and a focus on loan collections.
- 2017-24: Governor, BEAC: When Tolli assumed office, the BEAC's international reserves were low, member countries were in recession, and there was some discussion of the possible need for a devaluation of the CFA franc. An operational audit in 2017 laid the groundwork for a reform plan, implemented in the succeeding years, covering monetary operations, macroeconomic management, financial sector reform, and internal management.

On December 13, 2024, the Government of Chad formally nominated Tolli as a candidate in the May 2025 election to the Presidency of the African Development Bank. He had previously received the endorsement of the Economic Community of Central African States.

Controversy

In April 2022, the Central African Republic passed a law adopting the cryptocurrency Bitcoin as legal tender, only the second country in the world to do so. Tolli opposed this move as contrary to the regional treaties governing the BEAC. The CAR was eventually compelled to suspend the new law pending the issuance of BEAC regulations governing cryptocurrency in the region.
