= Yvon Sana Bangui =

Central African central banker

6th Governor of the Bank of Central African States
- Appointed by: Conference of Heads of State of the Economic and Monetary Community of Central African States
- In office March 1, 2024 – 28 February 2031
- Governor: Bank of Central African States
- Preceded by: Abbas Tolli
- Website: BEAC.int

Yvon Sana Bangui was installed as the sixth Governor of the Bank of Central African States (BEAC) on March 1, 2024. The appointment is for 7 years and is nonrenewable. He was selected by the Conference of Heads of State of the CEMAC region.

A native of Begoua in the Central African Republic, he is reported to be 50 years of age as of 2024.

Yvon Sana Bangui was trained in France and Morocco, studying Computer Science, as well as Economics and Public Management. He joined the BEAC in 2005, and rose through the ranks of the Bank, being named Director of Information Systems in 2017, and then Central Director of Accounting, Budget and Management Control in 2021. His appointment was in keeping with the rotation of the Governorship among member countries.
