= Jean-Félix Mamalepot =

Jean-Félix Mamalepot (December 28, 1940 – December 12, 2012) was a Gabonese banker who was Governor of the Bank of Central African States (BEAC) from 1990 to 2007.

== Life and career ==
Mamalepot was born at Mbabiri in the Haut-Ogooué Province of Gabon; he was a member of the Kota ethnic group. He was educated in France and joined the Bank of the States of Equatorial Africa and Cameroon in 1968. In 1970, he joined the Gabonese Development Bank as Deputy Director-General and then as Director-General, remaining in that post until 1990. He briefly served as Finance Adviser to Prime Minister Casimir Oyé-Mba in 1990.

Prior to Oyé-Mba's appointment as Prime Minister of Gabon, he had been Governor of the BEAC, and Mamalepot was appointed to replace Oyé-Mba as BEAC Governor on July 24, 1990; he took over that post in October 1990.

The Conference of the Heads of State of the Economic and Monetary Community of Central Africa (CEMAC) decided to replace Mamalepot as BEAC Governor in April 2007. He was instead appointed as High Commissioner to the Presidency of Gabon, in charge of the establishment of the Mandji Free Zone—a special economic area on the island of Mandji at Port-Gentil—on June 21, 2007.

Subsequently, Mamalepot was elected for a three-year term as President of the Council of Administration of the National Health Insurance and Social Security Fund (Caisse nationale d'assurance maladie et de garantie sociale) on 26 November 2008. He was hospitalized in Paris at the Hôpital Cochin in November 2012, and he died at his home in Libreville on 12 December 2012.
