= Philippe Auboyneau =

French admiral (1899–1961)

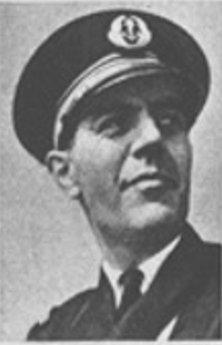
- Born: 9 November 1899; Constantinople
- Died: 22 February 1961 (aged 61); Paris, France
- Occupation: Naval officer

Philippe Marie Joseph Raymond Auboyneau (French pronunciation: [filip maʁi ʒozɛf ʁɛmɔ̃ obwano]; 9 November 1899 – 22 February 1961) was an officer in the French Navy. As an admiral, he was commander of the Free French naval forces in the Pacific and the Mediterranean during the Second World War. He was awarded the Ordre de la Libération for his service to the country.

== Life ==
=== Pre-war ===
Auboyneau was born in Constantinople, where his father was director of the Ottoman Bank. He entered the École navale in 1917 at age 17. From March to November 1918 he took part in patrols along the English Channel as an ensign on board the torpedo boat Typhon. He then served in the Middle East and the Far East for ten years, commanding the hydrographic vessel Alidade, then the gunboat Doudart de Lagrée on the Yangtze.

After some time in France in the Naval Ministry, he entered the École de guerre navale, leaving it as deputy chief of staff for France's Atlantic torpedo-boat fleet. As a captain, he was then made deputy chief of staff to France's Far East naval forces at Saigon, where he found himself on the declaration of war in 1939. He was then charged with several liaison missions to the Royal Navy.

=== Second World War ===
At the time of the Armistice, he was a liaison officer on board HMS Warspite and played an important role in the delicate negotiations between Admiral Andrew Cunningham and Admiral René-Émile Godfroy for the fate of the Force X, becoming the main architect of compromise signed between the two admirals, which decided on the status of the French squadron in Alexandria. He then traveled to London to join the forces of Free France, arriving on 20 July 1940.

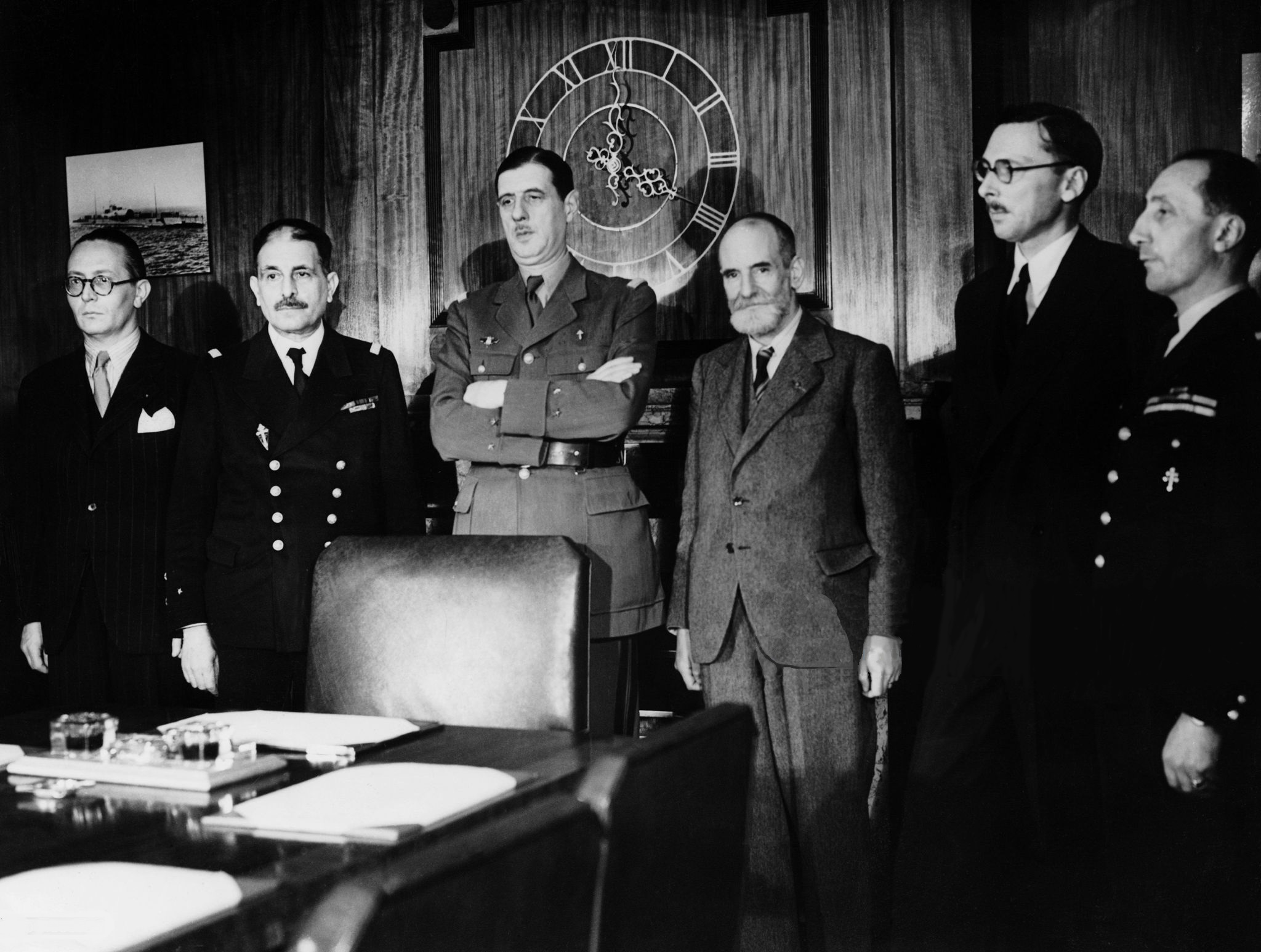
Auboyneau (at the far right) with the French National Committee in London.

He was sent to command the French destroyer Le Triomphant, which he re-armed. After several missions in the Atlantic, he was promoted to capitaine de vaisseau and made commander of Free France's naval forces in the Pacific, with his flag on Triomphant. He was in Australia at the time of Japan's entry into the war and took part in several operations in the South Pacific with the Australian fleet, most notably a raid near a Japanese naval base to evacuate the garrisons of the Nauru Island and Ocean Island.

Returning to London in April 1942, he was made commander of all Free France's naval forces and national commissioner for the navy. He inspected French naval units in Equatorial Africa, the Levant, Madagascar and Djibouti. At the start of the campaign in North Africa, he was made chief of the naval staff, then major general within General Henri Giraud's supreme civil and military command. This made him one of the main architects of the merger of Free France's naval forces and Vichy France's North African fleet. He then left that role to command the 3rd Cruiser Division, heading it for Operation Dragoon in August 1944. In 1945, he became a vice admiral and was put in command of France's naval forces in the Far East, where he transported and supported General Leclerc's troops in South Annam and led the landings at Tonkin.

=== Post-war ===
He was a member of the superior counsel for national defence and a member of the superior counsel for the Navy. He was then made inspector general of naval forces and naval aviation. From 1952 to 1955, he commanded France's naval forces in the Far East and from 1955 to 1960 its naval forces in Algeria. Auboyneau's chauffeur Vincent Fusco saved him from an assassination attempt on rue Dupuch in Algiers in 1957.

Auboyneau was one of those who on 13 May 1958 led to Charles de Gaulle's return during the May 1958 crisis. In 1960, he joined the Conseil d’État as an extraordinary counsellor.

He died in Paris in 1961 and his funeral took place in the Église Saint-Louis-des-Invalides, with de Gaulle presiding. He was buried at Marly-le-Roi.
