= Free French Africa =

World War II-era African support for Free France

Afrique française libre Free French Africa
- Flag

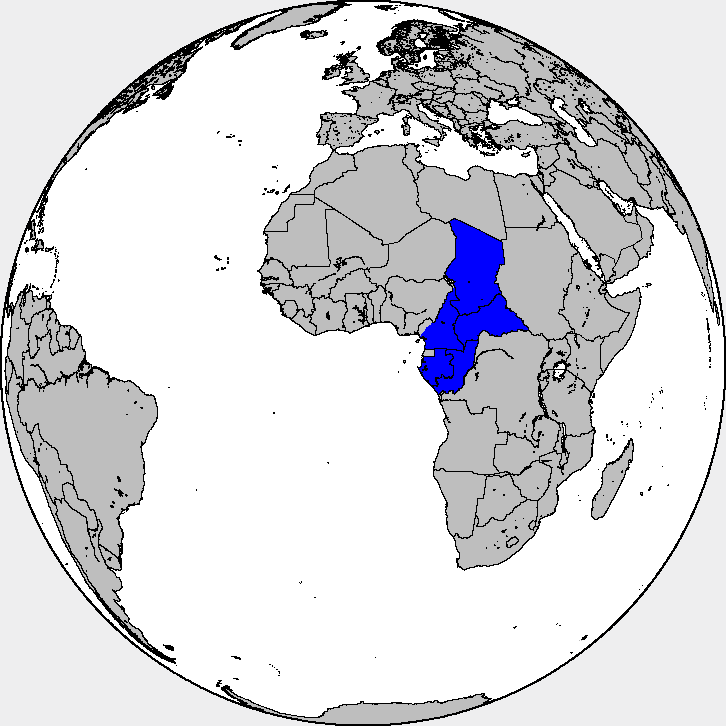
- Free French Africa in November 1940, including Chad, French Cameroon, Ubangi-Shari, Gabon, French Congo.
- Capital: Brazzaville (1940–1944); Algiers (1943–1944)
- Official language: French
- Type: Federation
- Membership: French Equatorial Africa; French Cameroon

Leaders
  - High Commissioner: Edgard de Larminat (1940–41); Adolphe Sicé (1941–42)
- Establishment: August 1940

Free French Africa (French: Afrique française libre, sometimes abbreviated to AFL) was the political entity which collectively represented the colonial territories of French Equatorial Africa and Cameroon under the control of Free France in World War II.

It provided a political and territorial base for Free France and strengthened General Charles de Gaulle's international position. It made a major contribution to the war effort by financing the French Resistance, by the contribution of its many soldiers to the Free French Forces, and by the military exploitation of its installations and territories.

Because of its geographical location, Free French Africa offered a considerable asset to the Allies, favouring military operations from Chad in the Western Desert Campaign in Egypt and Libya, as well as facilitating communications across the continent, thus giving British colonies the ability to communicate with each other.

== History and territories ==
During the Second World War, following the Appeal of 18 June, 1940, General Charles de Gaulle called for the continuation of the fight with the hopes of relying on the vast size of the French empire and its many colonies in Africa.

The commander-in-chief of the French forces in North Africa, Charles Noguès, eventually gave up the fight after previously giving speeches showing his desire to continue. After giving in to the Vichy regime, and supporting Philippe Pétain, French West Africa also gave in after losing the Battle of Dakar.

French Equatorial Africa, on the other hand, progressively rallied towards Free France under the leadership of Félix Éboué, the governor of the French colony of Chad. On 3 July 1940 he wrote to de Gaulle expressing his desire to continue the fight. And on 26 August 1940 with the support of Colonel Marchand and Henri Laurentie, he officially proclaimed that Chad was a part of Free France. This provided Free France with territory where it could exercise sovereignty and raise troops.

On the same day of the official regrouping of Chad to Free France, Philippe Leclerc de Hauteclocque landed in Douala, taking control of the territory on the following day, effectively making Cameroon a part of Free France. After the addition of Cameroon, the French Congo, led by Colonel Edgard de Larminat, on August 28, and Ubangi-Shari (present day Central African Republic) followed suit On 29 August 1940, the government of Free French Africa was created by Colonel de Larminat.

Gabon did not initially join Free France, and remained loyal to Vichy. But, in November 1940, under Leclerc, Free France led an offensive attack in Gabon, and after fighting from the 9th to the 10th, Gabon was forced to join Free France.

== Political base of Free France ==
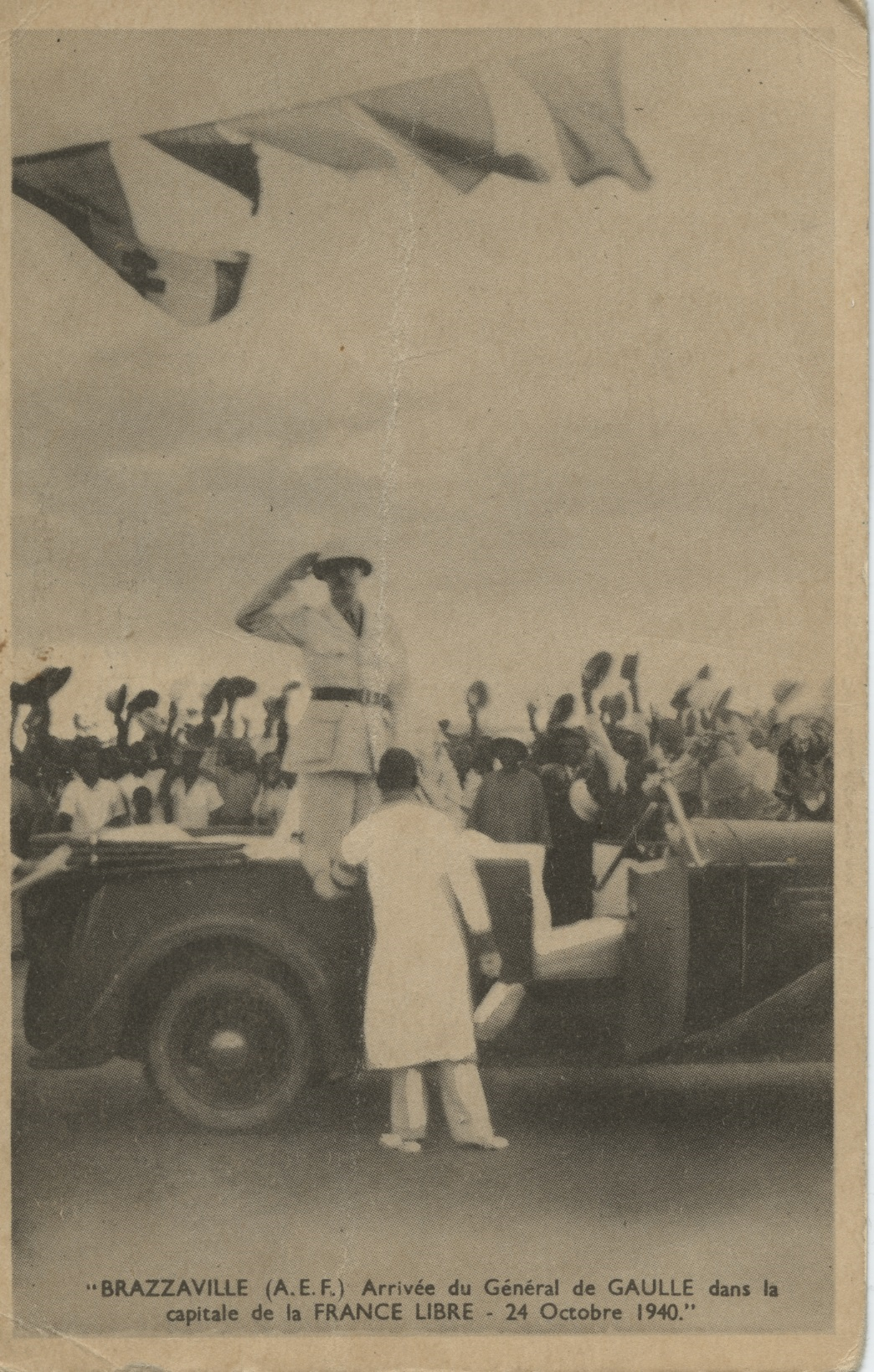
De Gaulle arrives in Brazzaville, the capital.

In the vast territory of Free French Africa, including French Equatorial Africa and French Cameroon, Charles de Gaulle was able to exercise full powers as head of Free France, on an equal footing with a head of state. After passing through Douala in Cameroon, and Chad, he arrived in Brazzaville on 24 October 1940, which was already the seat of government both of French Congo, as well as of the government of the federation of French Equatorial Africa.

Brazzaville became the capital of Free French Africa and of all of Free France and it was there that de Gaulle signed the first decrees and orders that would govern the Free French territory. Brazzaville remained the capital until 1943, when Algiers took over.

While Brazzaville was the capital of Free French Africa, Charles de Gaulle created the Empire Defense Council on 27 October 1940, with the goal of dealing with “the general conduct of war for the liberation of the country”. It was also in Brazzaville that de Gaulle instituted the Order of Liberation on 16 November 1940, and gave secret instructions to Colonel Leclerc of the 2nd Armed division. Radio-Brazzaville became the official radio of Free France.

The new governor general of Brazzaville was Félix Éboué, the first to join Free France. Initially, the administration of the territories retained the previous functions before engaging in a series of fundamental reforms which sought for policies based on association instead of assimilation. This new policy wanted to respect “Natural Institutions”. Éboué regularly brought together leaders from French colonies. In particular, he hosted these leaders on January 30, 1944 to discuss the “French Union” and to rethink the relationship of French territories to the metropole.

Trade unions were reauthorized in Free French Africa in 1943, and this allowed victims of administrative injustices to have their voices heard. Free French Africa lost its status at the arrival of the Americans in North Africa in 1942. And in 1943 Algiers became the new capital of Free French Africa, and the territory was reunited with North Africa, French West Africa, and French Equatorial Africa.

== Contribution to the war effort ==
=== Personnel and military ===
The peoples of free French Africa were heavily involved in the war effort. Ten Marching Battalions (Note: A marching battalion (Bataillon de marche) is a provisional unit composed of several companies formed in an unconventional manner. A unit is called a "marching" unit when it is formed from elements of other units.) were formed there from December 1940 to January 1943, each composed of six hundred to eight hundred men. At the cost of heavy losses, they distinguished themselves on various battlefields.

The Second Marching Battalion, or the Ubangi-Shari Battalion, particularly stood out at the Battle of Bir Hakeim, where it became the first land-based unit to become a member of the Order of Liberation. The Third Marching Battalion of Chad was the only unit among French forces to take part in the Eritrean campaign.

These battalions also participated in the Syria–Lebanon campaign, intervened in Djibouti and Madagascar, and made up a third of the French troops engaged in the campaign in Cyrenaica.

In order to go north through the desert to participate in Libyan operations against Italian forces, Colonel Leclerc increased the size of his troops with the addition of men from Cameroon, and the recruitment of about 3,000 men from the Tirailleurs Sénégalais in Chad. Leclerc would then use Chad as a rear base for his operations and as a base for logistical support from January 1941 to January 1945.

An estimated total of 21,000 African troops from the army were sent to different military operations.

Charles de Gaulle wanted to reward the African men who fought for free France with Cross of Liberation medals. The Cross of Liberation is intended for distinguished military personnel and civilians who contributed to the liberation of France and its empire. De Gaulle asked to reward the many Black African troops; however, from the 200 files for Free French Africa, only 15 cases were rewarded.

=== Infrastructure ===
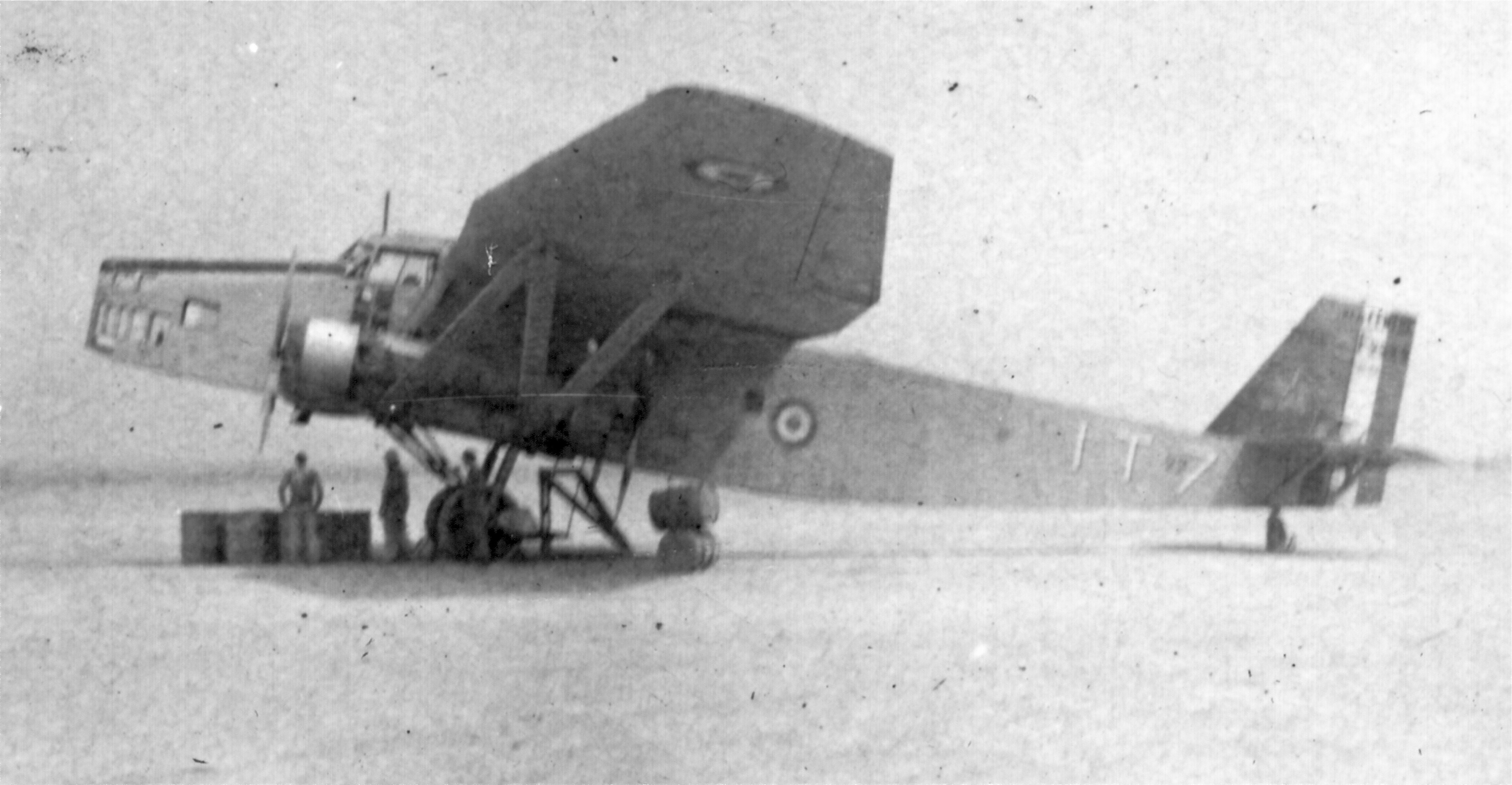
French plane in Africa during the Second World War.

The strategic military situation of Free French Africa offered Free France and the Allies a vast support and communications base in the heart of Africa. As a result, air transport and other infrastructure were widely developed. Seven airports were renovated or built, including the Fort-Lamy and Pointe-Noire airports, completed in 1942. The Brazzaville to Beirut airline was put into service in October 1941.

Allied air force planes arrived disassembled and packed in crates, were rebuilt at RAF Takoradi in the British Gold Coast colony, and transited through Chad, where they were able to stop at the new Fort Lamy airfield, before reaching the Middle East theatre of operations. Twenty thousand planes flew in or through Africa; 3,000 landed at Fort Lamy in 1942.

Road infrastructure was also improved. New roads were built totaling 10,000 kilometers. The main priorities were military, towards the operational fronts. These were the Douala-Bangui-Jubba axis, connecting Ethiopia and the fronts of the East African Campaign; the Bangui-Fort-Lamy transverse axis, which was passable in all seasons; and the Fort-Lamy to Faya-Largeau axis for the Libya Operations Front and the Western Desert Campaign.

=== Economic ===
French Equatorial Africa was nicknamed the "Cinderella" of French possessions in Africa, being less rich than North Africa or French West Africa. The four territories making it up are not of equal importance. Chad has vast regions of steppe and mountains, especially useful from a military point of view. Gabon and French Congo produce oilseeds and wood. The population was quite large in Ubangi-Shari and Chad. The Congo–Ocean Railway provides transport to the port of Pointe-Noire.

French Cameroon, which was not part of French Equatorial Africa, joined Free France at the end of August. It is comparatively richer, with considerable and varied production, including citrus, cocoa, wood palm and various other resources. Its demographic potential was also important, with already 2.4 million inhabitants in 1936.

The Free French Africa territories made considerable financial contributions during WWII. In addition to their contributions from taxes, they provided loans like the Africa Loan in 1942 and 1943, as well as the Aid to the Resistance in 1943. In the following year, they also provided financial assistance to prisoners and deportees.

Economic agreements were made between Great Britain and Cameroon on 21 January 1941, and in May of the same year, an agreement was made between Great Britain and French Equatorial Africa. These economic agreements allowed for the regularization of economic and commercial operations, and they also made it possible to promote distribution and export channels, particularly those concerning key crops like coffee, palm oil, latex, cotton, and livestock and mining products.

While Free French Africa made significant economic contributions, it is mainly traders and administrative officials that benefited from the returns.

== See also ==
- Brazzaville Conference
- Empire Defense Council
- Foreign policy of Charles de Gaulle
- Foreign relations of Vichy France
- Free France
- French Indochina in World War II
- French Resistance
- French Colonial Empire
- French Fourth Republic
- French Third Republic
- German military administration in occupied France during World War II
- German occupation of France during World War II
- Italian occupation of France during World War II
- Liberation of France
- Liberation of Paris
- List of French possessions and colonies
- List of governors-general of French Equatorial Africa
- Military history of France during World War II
- Philippe Pétain
- Provisional Government of the French Republic
- The Vichy 80
- Vichy France
- Zone libre
