= Foreign relations of Vichy France =

Overview of relations of Vichy France

The French State, popularly known as Vichy France, as led by Marshal Philippe Pétain after the Fall of France in 1940 before Nazi Germany, was quickly recognized by the Allies, as well as by the Soviet Union, until 30 June 1941 and Operation Barbarossa. However, France broke with the United Kingdom after the destruction of the French Fleet at Mers-el-Kebir. Canada maintained diplomatic relations until the occupation of Southern France (Case Anton) by Germany and Italy in November 1942.

== Relationships with the Axis powers ==
=== Germany ===
The armistice after Germany defeated France in June 1940 included numerous provisions, all of which largely guaranteed by the German policy of keeping 2 million French prisoners-of-war in Germany effectively as hostages. Vichy France was nominally in control of all of France apart from Alsace-Lorraine, but in practice the Germans controlled over half of the country; including the northern and western coasts, the industrial northeast, and the Paris region. Further, Italy, Germany's fascist ally, controlled a portion of southeastern France. The Pétain government in Vichy controlled the rest until November 1942, when Germany and Italy occupied the remainder. The Vichy regime then became entirely a puppet of the German occupiers. Germany wanted food, minerals, and industrial productions; as well as volunteers to work in German factories. Vichy was allowed to control its foreign colonies to the extent it could defend them against the Free French, and its fleet to the extent it could defend it against British naval attacks.

The small town of Montoire-sur-le-Loir was the scene of two meetings. On 22 October 1940, Pierre Laval met with Hitler to set up a meeting on 24 October between Hitler and Pétain. It ended in a much-publicized handshake between the two, but in fact their discussions had been entirely general and no decisions had been made. Hitler was impressed with Pétain's commitment to defend the French Empire. False rumours abounded that France had made major concessions regarding colonies and the German control of French ports and the French fleet. Vichy France never joined the Axis powers.

=== Italy ===
Vichy's relations with Italy were regulated by the Armistice of Villa Incisa (25 June 1940) and overseen by the Italian Commission on the Armistice with France. Italian delegations were sent to Vichy-controlled territories of Algeria, Djibouti, Morocco, Syria, and Tunisia.

== Relationships with the Allied powers ==
=== Australia ===
Australia maintained, until the end of the war, full diplomatic relations with the Vichy Regime and entered also into full diplomatic relations with the Free French.

=== Canada ===
Canada maintained full diplomatic relations with the Vichy Regime, until the full German occupation of the country in the beginning of November 1942.

=== China ===
Vichy France continued to maintain relations with the Republic of China government led by Chiang Kai-shek, who moved to Chongqing in the Chinese interior after the fall of the capital of Nanjing to the Japanese in 1937. French diplomats throughout the country were accredited to his Chongqing government. The Vichy regime resisted Japanese pressure to recognize, like the Axis, the Japanese puppet Reorganized National Government of China, which was established by Wang Jingwei in 1940 in occupied Nanjing.

=== United Kingdom ===
A condition of the armistice (22 June 1940) was that France would retain the French Navy, the Marine Nationale, under strict conditions. The Pétain government pledged that the fleet would never fall into German hands, but it refused to send the fleet beyond Germany's reach to Britain, America or even far-away places in the French colonial empire such as in the West Indies. That was not enough security for Winston Churchill, who feared that the French fleet would wind up in German hands and be used against British ships, which were vital to maintaining worldwide shipping and communications.

French ships in British ports were seized by the Royal Navy. Vice-Admiral James Fownes Somerville, with Force H under his command, was instructed to deal with the large squadron in port at Mers El Kébir harbor near Oran in July 1940. Various terms were offered to the French squadron, but all of them were rejected. Consequently, Force H opened fire on the French ships, killing 1,297 French military personnel, including nearly 1,000 French sailors when the Bretagne blew up. The French squadron at Alexandria, under Admiral René-Emile Godfroy, was effectively interned until 1943 after an agreement was reached with Admiral Andrew Browne Cunningham, commander of the Mediterranean Fleet.

Less than two weeks after the armistice, Britain had fired upon forces of its former ally. The result was shock and resentment towards Britain within the French Navy and by the general public in France. Vichy severed diplomatic relations with Britain on 8 July.

=== United States ===
The United States granted Vichy full diplomatic recognition, and sent Admiral William D. Leahy to France as ambassador. President Franklin Roosevelt and Secretary of State Cordell Hull hoped to use American influence to encourage those elements in the Vichy government opposed to military collaboration with Germany. American attempts to work with the Vichy regime strained Anglo-American relations, as the British considered the Vichy regime to be firmly subservient to Nazi Germany. The Americans also hoped to encourage Vichy to resist German war demands, such as for the fleet, air bases in French-mandated Syria, or moving war supplies through French territories in North Africa. The essential American position was that France should take no action unless it was explicitly required by the armistice terms that could adversely affect Allied efforts in the war. Upon the Anglo-American landings in North Africa in November 1942, the Vichy government severed relations with the United States. Following the German occupation of the southern Zone days later, the U.S. treated the former Vichy Government as extinct. Though neither side declared war, diplomatic staffs were interned until exchanges were arranged in March 1944.

The American position towards Vichy France and de Gaulle was especially hesitant and inconsistent. Roosevelt disliked de Gaulle and agreed with Leahy's view that de Gaulle was an "apprentice dictator."

While preparing for the landing in North Africa, the US looked for a senior French ally and turned to Henri Giraud. Finally, after François Darlan's turn towards the Free Forces, the US played him against de Gaulle. US General Mark W. Clark of the combined Allied command signed a deal with Admiral Darlan on 22 November 1942 a deal in which the Allies recognized Darlan as High Commissioner for North and West Africa.

Darlan was assassinated on 24 December 1942 and so Washington turned again towards Giraud, who was made High Commissioner of French North and West Africa. British resident minister Harold Macmillan brought together de Gaulle and Giraud, who were disparate personalities and quite hostile to each other, to serve as co-chairmen of the Committee of National Liberation. De Gaulle built a strong political base, but Giraud failed to do so and was displaced by de Gaulle.

=== Soviet Union ===
From mid-1940 to mid-1941 the Soviet Union maintained diplomatic relations with Vichy France. In March 1940, the Soviet Ambassador to France, Yakov Surits, had been declared persona non grata in his host country. Afterwards, the Soviet Chargé d'Affaires in Vichy, Alexander Bogomolov, maintained contacts with Vichy France. In March 1941, Bogomolov was promoted to Soviet Ambassador to France. The Vichy Ambassador to the Soviet Union, Gaston Bergery, arrived in Moscow only in late April 1941. In July 1941, the Soviet Union broke off diplomatic relations with Vichy France. Unofficial relations with Free France were established in August 1941.

== Free French Forces and threat of civil war ==
To counter the Vichy regime, General Charles de Gaulle created the Free French Forces (FFL) after his Appeal of 18 June 1940 radio speech. Initially, Winston Churchill was ambivalent about de Gaulle and dropped ties with Vichy only when it became clear that it would not fight the Germans. Even so, the Free France headquarters in London was riven with internal divisions and jealousies.

The additional participation of Free French forces in the Syrian operation was controversial within Allied circles. It raised the prospect of Frenchmen shooting at Frenchmen and fears of a civil war. Additionally, it was believed that the Free French were widely reviled within Vichy military circles and that Vichy forces in Syria were less likely to resist the British if they were not accompanied by elements of the Free French. Nevertheless, de Gaulle convinced Churchill to allow his forces to participate, but de Gaulle was forced to agree to a joint British-Free French proclamation promising that Syria and Lebanon would become fully independent at the end of the war.

== Vichy French colonies ==
While a few French colonies went over to the Free French immediately, many remained loyal to Vichy France. In time, the majority of the colonies tended to switch to the Allied side peacefully in response to persuasion and to changing events, but that took time. Guadeloupe and Martinique, in the West Indies, as well as French Guiana, on the northern coast of South America, did not join the Free French until 1943. Other French colonies had the decision to switch sides enforced more strenuously.

=== Saint Pierre and Miquelon ===
The Capture of Saint Pierre and Miquelon was a fast and bloodless operation that occurred on 24 December 1941. A Free French flotilla of one submarine and three corvettes sailed from Halifax and then disembarked armed sailors at Saint-Pierre port. The islands surrendered in twenty minutes.

=== Conflicts with Britain in Dakar, Syria, and Madagascar ===
On 23 September 1940, the British launched the Battle of Dakar, also known as Operation Menace, part of the West Africa Campaign. Operation Menace was a plan to capture the strategic port of Dakar in French West Africa, which was under the control of the Vichy French. The plan called for installing Free French forces under General de Gaulle in Dakar. The Allies were surprised by the Vichy garrison's determination to defend the colony and had expected them to change side without opposition. By 25 September, the battle was over, the plan was unsuccessful, and Dakar remained under Vichy French control. During the battle for Dakar, Vichy had launched retaliatory bombing raids on Gibraltar, which caused fairly minor damage but killed several civilians. Vichy aircraft had already bombed Gibraltar on 18 July in retaliation for the attack at Mers-el-Kébir. The failure at Dakar hurt de Gaulle's standing with the British. Adolf Hitler was pleasantly surprised with the Vichy French defence and allowed the Vichy Armistice Army's limit to be increased. The Free French instead set their sights on French Equatorial Africa, which, except for French Gabon, peacefully changed sides. The refusal of Gabon to change sides led to the Battle of Gabon between Free and Vichy forces, and it was soon also under Free French control.

In June 1941, the next flashpoint between Britain and Vichy France came when a revolt in Iraq was put down by British forces. Both German and Italian Air Force aircraft, staging through the French possession of Syria, intervened in the fighting in small numbers. That highlighted Syria as a threat to British interests in the Middle East. Consequently, on 8 June, British and Commonwealth forces invaded Syria and Lebanon. That was known as the Syria-Lebanon Campaign or Operation Exporter. The Syrian capital, Damascus, was captured on 17 June, and the five-week campaign ended with the fall of Beirut and the Armistice of Saint Jean d'Acre on 14 July 1941. Then, 5,668 Vichy French soldiers defected to the Free French, and the armistice agreement led to the repatriation of 37,563 military and civilian personnel back to France. That somewhat disappointed de Gaulle, who had expected more to defect to his side.

From 5 May to 6 November 1942, another major operation by British forces against Vichy French territory was launched, the Battle of Madagascar. The British feared that Japanese Navy might use Madagascar as a base and thus cripple British trade and communications in the Indian Ocean. As a result, Madagascar was invaded by British and Commonwealth forces. The island fell relatively quickly, and the operation ended in victory for the British, but the operation is often viewed as an unnecessary diversion of British naval resources away from more vital theatres of operation. It was agreed that the Free French would be explicitly excluded from the operation, because of tensions that had arisen from French forces fighting each other in Syria.

British troops would go on to come to blows with Vichy forces during Operation Torch.

=== French Indochina ===
In June 1940, the Fall of France made the French hold on Indochina tenuous. The isolated colonial administration was cut off from outside help and outside supplies. After the Japanese invasion in September 1940, the French were forced to allow the Japanese to set up military bases. That seemingly-subservient behaviour convinced the regime of Major-General Plaek Pibulsonggram, the Prime Minister of the Kingdom of Thailand, that Vichy France would not seriously resist a confrontation with Thailand. In October 1940, the military forces of Thailand initiated border skirmishes across the border with Indochina, which escalated into Franco-Thai War. The conflict was settled with Japanese mediation on 9 May 1941, with French Indochina losing territory to Thailand.

In March 1945, after Metropolitan France had been liberated, and the war situation looking increasingly grim for the Japanese, they staged a coup d'état in French Indochina, dissolved it and created puppet states of its constituent parts.

=== French Somaliland ===
In the early stages of East African Campaign in 1940, constant border skirmishes occurred between the forces in French Somaliland and the forces in Italian East Africa. After the fall of France in 1940, French Somaliland declared loyalty to Vichy France. The colony remained such during the rest of the East African Campaign but stayed out of that conflict. That lasted until December 1942, when the Italians had been defeated, and the French colony had had become isolated by a British blockade. Free French and the Allied forces recaptured the colony's capital, Djibouti, at the end of 1942.

=== French North Africa ===
The Allied invasion French North Africa, Morocco, Algeria, and Tunisia, started on 8 November 1942 with landings in Morocco and Algeria. The invasion, known as Operation Torch, was launched after the Soviet Union had pressed the Americans and the British to start operations in Europe, and open a second front to help reduce the pressure of German forces on the Soviet troops. The American commanders wanted to land in occupied Europe as soon as possible (Operation Sledgehammer), but the British commanders believed that such a move would end in disaster. An attack on French North Africa was proposed instead to clear the Axis from North Africa, improve naval control of the Mediterranean Sea, and prepare an invasion of Southern Europe in 1943. US President Franklin Roosevelt suspected that the operation in North Africa would rule out an invasion of Europe in 1943 but agreed to support British Prime Minister Winston Churchill.

== Leader in North Africa, 1942–43 ==
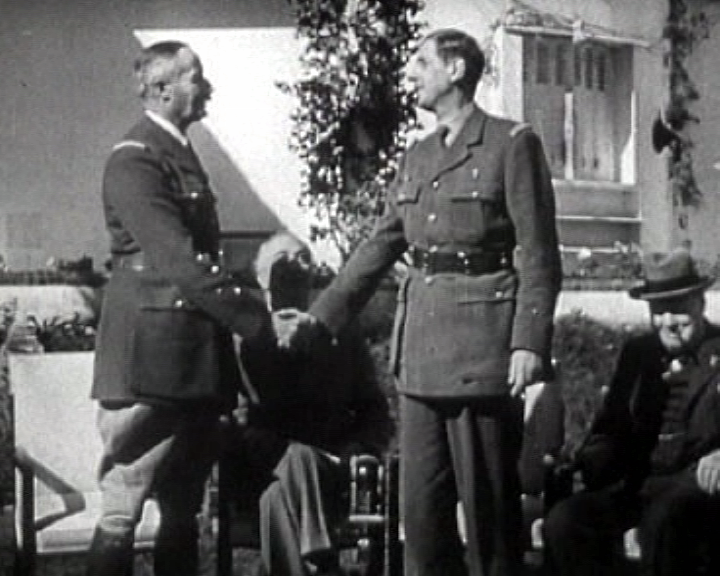
Henri Giraud and de Gaulle during the Casablanca Conference in January 1943

Admiral François Darlan had landed in Algiers the day before Operation Torch. Roosevelt and Churchill accepted Darlan, rather than de Gaulle, as the French leader in North Africa. Dwight Eisenhower accepted Darlan as high commissioner of French North Africa and West Africa, a move that enraged de Gaulle, who refused to recognize Darlan's status. After Darlan had signed an armistice with the Allies and took power in North Africa, Germany invaded Vichy France on 10 November 1942 in an operation codenamed Case Anton), which triggered the scuttling of the French fleet in Toulon.

General Henri Giraud had switched from Vichy to the Allies, and Roosevelt found him a preferable alternative to de Gaulle.

Giraud arrived in Algiers on November 10 and agreed to subordinate himself to Darlan as the French African army commander. He was now in the Allied camp, but Darlan maintained the repressive Vichy system in North Africa, including concentration camps in southern Algeria and racist laws. Detainees were also forced to work on the Transsaharien railroad. Jewish property was "aryanized" (confiscated), and a special Jewish Affair service was created, directed by Pierre Gazagne. Numerous Jewish children were prohibited from going to school, which even Vichy had not implemented in Metropolitan France. Darlan was assassinated on 24 December 1942 in Algiers by the young monarchist Bonnier de La Chapelle, who was soon killed, probably after he had acted as part of a conspiracy involving Henri, Count of Paris.

Giraud became Darlan's successor in French Africa with Allied support after a series of consultations between de Gaulle and Giraud. De Gaulle wanted to pursue a political position in France and agreed to have Giraud as commander in chief as a more qualified military person. It is questionable that he ordered that many French Resistance leaders who had helped Eisenhower's troops to be arrested, without any protest by Roosevelt's representative, Robert Murphy. Later, the Americans sent Jean Monnet to counsel Giraud and to press him into repeal the Vichy laws. After very difficult negotiations, Giraud agreed to suppress the racist laws and to liberate Vichy prisoners of the South Algerian concentration camps. The Cremieux decree, which granted French citizenship to Jews in Algeria and had been repealed by Vichy, was immediately restored by de Gaulle.

Giraud took part in the Casablanca Conference with Roosevelt, Churchill and de Gaulle in January 1943. The Allies discussed their general strategy for the war and recognized joint leadership of North Africa by Giraud and de Gaulle. Giraud and de Gaulle then became co-presidents of the Comité français de la Libération nationale, which unified the Free French Forces and territories controlled by them and had been founded at the end of 1943. Democratic rule was restored in French Algeria, and the communists and the Jews liberated from the concentration camps.

The Americans were notably cool, if not hostile, to de Gaulle, and especially resented his refusal to cooperate in the Normandy invasion of 6 June 1944 (Operation Overlord). With the Vichy leaders gone from French territory, on 23 October 1944, the Americans, the British and the Soviets formally recognized the Provisional Government of the French Republic (GPRF), headed by de Gaulle, as the legitimate government of France.

== See also ==
- Diplomatic history of World War II
- History of French foreign relations
