= Paul Ruff =

French resistance fighter

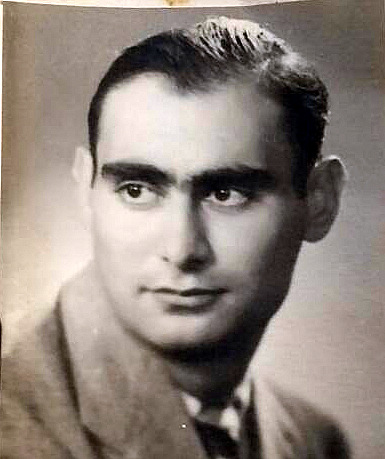

Paul Ruff (7 January 1913 – 16 October 2000) was a French trade unionist, mathematician and resistance fighter.

== Life ==
=== Family background ===
His great-grandfather, Léopold Ruff, was born in Fegersheim in 1805 and died there in 1849, after having had two sons, born on 10 September 1832 and 3 March 1838, to whom he gave the same first name, Michel. The eldest settled in Algeria under the Second French Empire, where his younger brother joined him, leaving Alsace-Moselle after the defeat in the Franco-Prussian War of 1870. Both married teachers in Algiers, the first in 1859, the second in 1875. The latter ran the Michel Ruff bookstore there, known for bringing together cultured circles until 1912, before disappearing in 1915. Married in 1875 to Buna Dreyfus, a teacher who became a girls' school director, they had four children. The eldest of their sons, Pierre Jules Ruff, born in 1877, broke with the family and left for Paris in 1900; the fourth, Ernest, and the third brother, Paul-Charles Ruff, better known under the name of Charles Lussy, also left for the metropolis in 1911. The second of the brothers, Maurice, Inspector of Cultures at the General Government of Algeria, married Reine Sultana Amar, in Sidi Bel Abbès where the eldest of their two children, Paul, was born in 1913. The first grandson of Michel II, and eldest son of Maurice, was named Paul, after his cousin, whom had died in 1901.
Ruff grew up in the cultured Jewish society of Algiers, attending the boys' lycée there before attending the Lycée Louis-le-Grand and École Normale Supérieure, both in Paris, being admitted to the latter in 1934. Anna Berensztejn, still a high school student, left to help the Spanish Republican dissidents in 1938, will need to catch up on the mathematics lessons given in her absence. Paul proposes to give them to her, their relationship does not stop there, and they marry on the eve of his mobilization in 1939 as second lieutenant of an anti-aircraft battery; his unit withdrew in good order in the Fall of France in 1940, after shooting down the first Nazi planes of the war.
Demobilized on 6 August 1940, he manages to meet back his young wife in Limousin, when their first child has already not survived the debacle, and then they rushed south to take the last boat for Algiers, where Ruff's parents still lived and from which he later hoped to return to rejoin the Free French forces.

=== Resistance work ===
On 18 November 1940, he was "banned from accessing and exercising public office" under the Vichy regime's 3 October 1940, without losing his French nationality by the repealing of the Crémieux Decree and whilst not being one of those thus reduced to the "status of native Jew subject to French law" by the Vichy regime. In 1942 there were more than 12,000 men in the French force and its army-staff in Algiers and in November Pétain's highest representative admiral Darlan was there on a private visit.

In the meantime Ruff had joined a resistance group under captain Bouin tasked with demobilising prisoners and escapees and in contact with the young student Jean Athias, the lawyer Maurice Ayoun and Dr André Morali-Daninos. He was also active in recruiting resistors. With his wife's and parents' support, on 6 November 1942 he became one of the main group leaders which initially met at Professor Henri Aboulker's home at 26 rue Michelet in Algiers, the headquarters of the conspiracy.

The insurrection was fomented by a wide variety of resistors, very compartmentalised into small groups (including, in disorder, captain Alfred Pillafort, Henri d'Astier de la Vigerie, Jacques Lemaigre-Dubreuil, Jean Rigault, Jacques Tarbé de Saint-Hardouin, abbé Cordier, lieutenant-colonel Alphonse Van Hecke, Roger Carcassonne-Leduc, Prof. Henri Aboulker, his son José Aboulker, Bernard Karsenty, Dr Raphaël Aboulker, Stéphane Aboulker, Emile Atlan, Charles Bouchara, André Témime, Dr André Morali-Daninos, Police commissioner André Achiary, general Charles Mast, lieutenant-colonel Germain Jousse and colonel Louis Baril). It aimed to assist an Anglo-American landing in North Africa following the secret Messelmoun accords, in order to help the success of the Anglo-American landing in North Africa, following the secret agreements of Messelmoun passed with General Mark W. Clark. Within the framework of this "Operation Torch", their planned intervention consisted of neutralizing the armed forces and the administration loyal to the Vichy regime, temporarily paralyzing the entire organization of military defense and civil powers in Algeria, arresting its leaders, and interrupting local and outside communications, following a strategy developed by Lieutenant-Colonel Jousse, local major in Algiers, using by diverting it, the "M.O." plan, a plan for maintaining order in the event of an alert previously drawn up to entrust the Legionary Order Service with emergency powers.

Twelve groups were formed. Group D, led by Paul Ruff who would be recognized as "the big boss" by his deputy Hugues Fanfani, along with officials Bernard Amiot, Yves Dechezelles, Dr Stanislas (Stacha) Cviklinski, Laurent Preziosi, Dr Becache and Michel and Léon Brudno. On the 7th, Amiot, their liaison officer, joined by Dechezelles, warned the other members of the group to go immediately to Algiers where they would meet in the next two hours at his house, to learn the date of the landing of the Allied troops on the coasts of North Africa in the night to come. The Brudno brothers, Laurent Preziosi, and three others would provide them on the evening of the 7th with 200 cartridges of explosives from the construction site of the main sewer collector, quickly mounted in the manner of the Spanish dinamiteros, to make up for the insufficiency of their armament.

It was uncertain how they would acquire the 55 participants planned. Numerous defections reduced them to 19, as well as many of their actions, for lack of staff, such as the capture of the police station in the 7th arrondissement, which was to be their command post, the shutdown of the Civic Center of the Legionary Order Service or the release of prisoners from the Maison Carrée civil prison, suitable for providing recruits. Their group managed to seize the interurban telephone exchange of the Champ-de-manœuvre, close to the buildings of the Legionary Order Service of Algiers, and to cut off all local and interurban civil communications. All the personnel present ended up being under the guard of the insurgents without casualities.

Subsequently, the docking of two British destroyers who had come to seize the port by disembarking 300 rangers at the quay was taken under the cannonade of the Admiralty and the maritime gendarmerie. Seeing from the nearby telephone exchange, the setting up on the roof of the Arsenal of a machine gun intended to repel the allies, with the authorization of the central police station, their rifle fire caused one of the servants to disappear, putting an end to the installation of the machine gun.

Facilitating communication between the different groups between them, his action contributed to ensuring the effectiveness of the "putsch", so named subsequently, during Operation Torch, and its rapid success with the Allied takeover, with very little casualties and fighting in Algiers, compared to other landing sites in Morocco in Casablanca, Safi and Port Lyautey, in Algeria in Oran, where the actions of the resistance fighters had been thwarted.

They held the Belcourt telephone exchange building despite the arrival of armored cars, until 12:15 p.m. on 8 November. The Mogador telephone exchange was already taken over and in operation. Picking up on order and in order, they left unnoticed one after the other through a service door, taking only their personal weapons and leaving the dynamite and rifles in place, while the American troops of General Ryder were already in Algiers.

Thoughsthere were for the most part, young and more or less well armed, in the various groups that met the day before of 8 November 1942, to take action in this insurrection plotted to temporarily neutralize the Vichy response from Algiers, a decisive aid to the rapid success of the Anglo-American landing in North Africa, in accordance with the secret agreements made with Cherchell, who will succeed beyond their exwould tions, and who will be qualified later as thouldbisector of the war", or by Churchill, as "the end of the beginning". The success of the action of the resistance fighters ensuring the rapid victory of the Allied landings in North Africa against the civil and military powers in Algiers, then opens for these supporters of a ed llying to De Gaulle, contrary to their expectations, a period of proscription, imprisonment and exclusion. Although under the control of the Americans, the French High Commission in Africa, the new French civil and military power in place in Algiers directed by Darlan, maintained in its functions the greater part of the Vichy administration, of its leaders and their ideology.

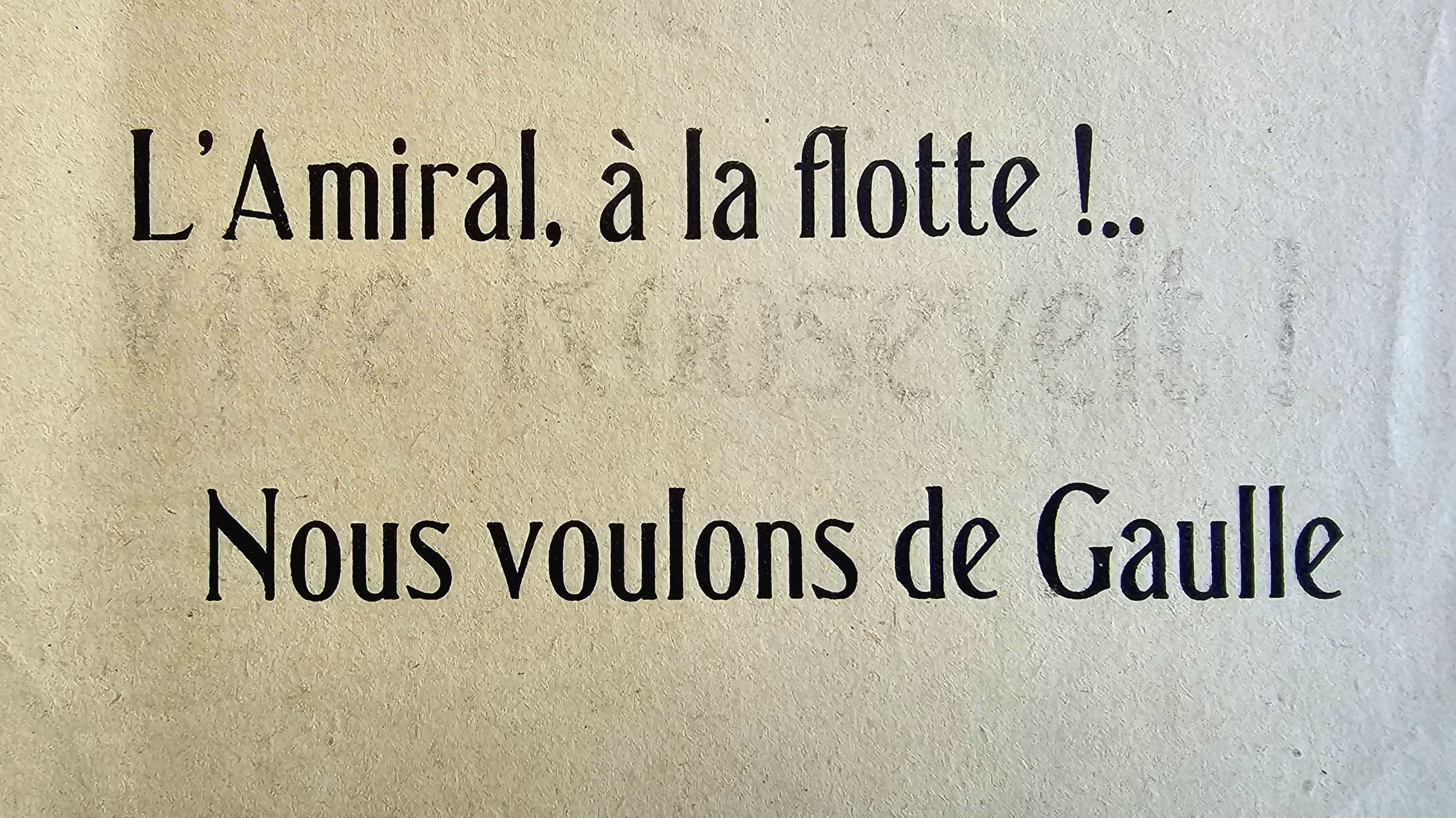
écrit par Dechezelles, Fanfani et Preziosi, contre l'Amiral Darlan, et jeté sur le défilé militaire à Alger fin novembre 1942

As soon as 23 November, the arrests of resistance fighters on 8 November multiplied, and while he continued to stick with Yves and Myriam Dechezelles, Hugues Fanfani, the Brudno brothers, Stacha Cviklinkski, Bernard Amiot and Laurent Preziosi butterflies as posters, he was arrested on 26 November during the night and held incommunicado in the Military Prison of Algiers. The last members of his group who escaped arrest, including Amiot and Fanfani, launched the butterflies "The Admiral to the sea! We want De Gaulle" from the terraces on the Allied military parade on 2 December in the d'Isly street. In Algiers. Émile Atlan, Charles Bouchara, and Roger Jaïs were arrested on the night of 5 to 6 December 1942. He was later released on 11 December on bail and was among the 28 to be court-martialed, brought together on 22 December before the Permanent Military Tribunal of Algiers, special jurisdiction of the Vichy government, which will remain in office until February 1943. After the abandonment of legal proceedings following the armed intervention in court of a military detachment of the Allied forces alerted by the insistent requests of Annie Ruff, Florence Atlan, Myriam Dechezelles, and other wives of resistance fighters, they were all released on the spot.

As enlistment and conscription were restored to train troops, joining their units was complicated for resistance fighters, with the law of 3 October 1940 remaining in force (it would be abolished in May 1943 with the other Vichy laws, the reinstatement of the Crémieux decree being postponed until October 1943).

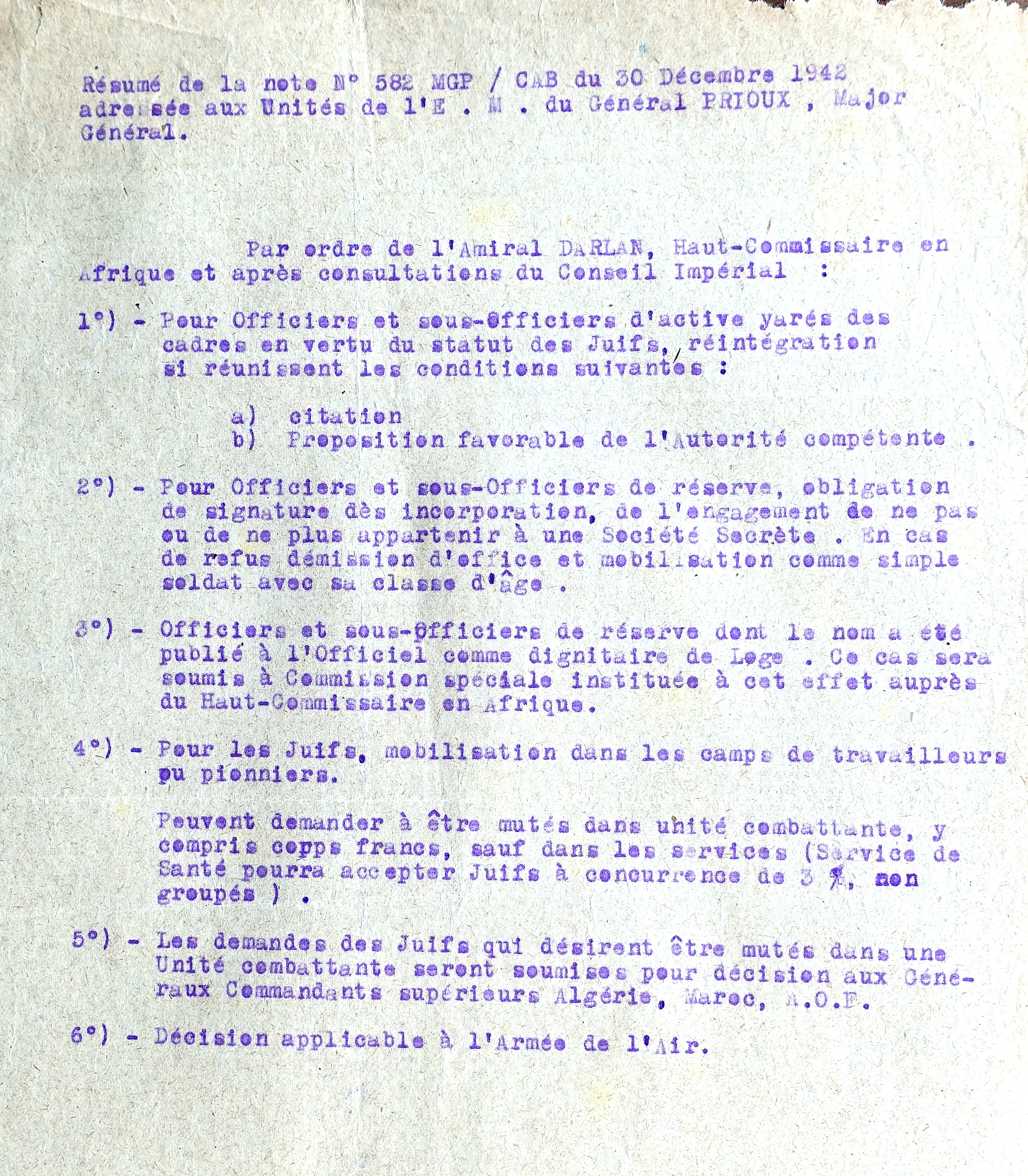
Summary of Note 582 MGP-CAB of 30 December 1942 addressed to the units of the General Staff, of General Prioux, Major General, (by order of Admiral Darlan, and after consultation with the Imperial Council)

The High Commission of France in Africa, chaired by Admiral Darlan before becoming the French Civil and Military Command-in-Chief under the authority of General Giraud, enacted several further regulatory provisions successive discriminations in the recruitment of the French army, from 16 November 1942 to 15 March 1943, to continue to exclude active and reserve military Jews and Freemasons, by assigning them to "pioneer companies" in labor camps to the very harsh living conditions, in Chéraga, and in southern Algeria, (in Laghouat for the Aboulker or in El Meridj for Émile Atlan), or by sending them to the colonial troops, "so that they cannot take advantage en bloc thereafter the title of veterans, and not to prejudge their future status". But these internment camps, from which some will escape to join the free corps and combat units, will be officially closed thereafter, on 28 April 1943.

Paul Ruff, recalled on 22 December 1942, was assigned to the 1st Zouaves Regiment and sent to the Chéraga camp. He left on 28 March 1943, detached to the General Staff in the direction of Military Security, but "refusing to be an honorary Aryan". In early October 1943, he found his posting in the DCA, to the 16th Group of Ground Antiaircraft Forces. Promoted on 3 March 1944 by the French National Liberation Committee (Gaullist) to temporary lieutenant, he embarked with his unit on 6 October 1944 from Mers el-Kébir for Marseille, went back to participate with the African Army in the Battle of Belfort from 16 to 27 November 1944, then on the Alsace Front until 14 December 1944.

He was then detached to the Atlantic Army on 14 April 1945, then in Marennes and La Rochelle until 30 April and in support of the Oléron landing on 1 May 1945, for the reduction of the Royan pocket, before being sent in July to the occupation troops in Germany and demobilized on 1 September 1945.

=== Maths professor ===
Aggregated in 1937, he gave lessons in 1938 at the Lycée Carnot in Paris. In 1939, an annual scholarship from the Arconati-Visconti fund was granted to him by the Faculty of Sciences to work on a thesis on probabilities, which the declaration of war would later interrupt. Returning to Algiers, he was appointed to the rectorate and charged on 19 September 1940 with teaching mathematics at the start of the school year at the Lycée de Garçons d'Alger, he was suspended on 19 November 1940, and participated in the creation of schools. They quickly opened to accommodate Jewish pupils, high school students, students and teachers excluded from public education, to whom he also gave lessons. His reinstatement as an associate professor, following an order from the new Governor General of Algeria, General Catroux, did not take place until 15 June 1943, countersigned by the same rector of the Academy of Algiers who had expelled him for two years and half before.

At the end of the war, approached as chief of staff to the Minister of Air, without resuming the interrupted work of his thesis on the calculation of probability, he chose to return to the National Education in 1945 as a mathematics teacher in Paris, at the Lycée Voltaire, then in the preparatory classes for the Grandes Ecoles of the Lycées Jean-Baptiste-Say, Chaptal and Saint-Louis, until his retirement in 1976.

In the meantime he wrote, with Maurice Monge, ensembles et nombres for the final classes in the mathematics section, and the formalization of the relationship of pre-order in an accessible educational sheet, familiarizing teachers and students with set theory, actively contributing to the reform of teaching known as "New Math".

=== Trade unionist ===
From 1947, he was secretary general until 1966 of the Syndicat de l'enseignement de la region Paris, the SERP, then the name of the Seine section of the FEN (which includes -even the S.N.I and the SNES), then set up with militants close to the autonomous groups, a "Force Ouvrière". tendency, but when this put an end to the double affiliation, he left F.O. after 1950, to be part of the committee of the Autonomous National Education Federation.

A determined activist, he was an actor leader in several union apparatuses in public education, fervent defender of the independence of autonomous tendencies and democratic. Most often in opposition in internal struggles with the C.G.T. and the leadership of the P.C.F. within the national administrative commissions of the F.E.N. and the S.N.E.S. He assumed important responsibilities as a leader both nationally and academically where he also participated in the training of teachers in modern mathematics, successively member of several offices and national commissions for more than twenty years, between 1948 and 1969. He significantly contributed in the elaboration of reflections as author or participant in the writing of feature articles, both in the majority and in the opposition before retiring from the national trade union scene in 1969, hard hit by the accidental disappearance of their only daughter Michèle, in 1965 after passing the tests of mathematics certification of aptitude as second degree's professor. Retired continued to animate the introduction to computers and the game of bridge at the Club of retirees of the Mutuelle générale de l'Éducation nationale, whose Annie Ruff runs the Medical Consultation Center in Paris.

=== Political engagement ===
Along with other left-wing intellectuals driven by ideals such as freedom of thought and speech, dissemination of knowledge, humanism, an active rejection of oppression and segregation such as fascism, imperialism, totalitarianism, racism and colonialism, he was open to internationalism and various revolutionary, self-managing or libertarian attempts, and had long been detached from orthodox communism and the PCF. In the context of the Soviet intervention in Budapest and the Franco-British intervention in Suez in 1956 (he was opposed to both), he was one of the founders of Clado (Liaison and Action Committee for Workers' Democracy) an open forum for trade union issues and workers' struggles, bringing together militant trade unionists and policies against imperialisms and bureaucracies, and respecting the political nuances of its members in opposition to the unitary and fixed leaderships of the P.C.F and the C.G.T., and where Dechezelles is also found, and for which he will propose ' 'La Commune' as the title of the newspaper (seven issues, between April 1957 and March 1958; he will also organize public meetings) and those of the magazine Arguments. He participated from 1955 to 1957, in the first office (with Pierre Lambert, Daniel Guérin, Yves Dechezelles, Laurent Schwartz, Madeleine Kahn, Elie Boisselier, Jean Cassou, Alexandre Hébert, Louis Houdeville, Yvonne Issartel, Guy Marty, Marceau Pivert, Daniel Renard, Robert Chéramy, Jean Rous, Geneviève Serreau, Marcel Valière) of the Committee for the release of Messali Hadj, a detained Algerian historic nationalist leader. He was one of the first 45 signatories of the Appeal to opinion, against the attacks targeting trade unionists of the Union Syndicale des Travailleurs Algériens (La Vérité, 17 October 1957), eliminated by the movement of the F.L.N. supported by the PCF. He was also one of the first 40 to sign the Appeal for a liberation of the labor movement.

Alongywith of his friends in the resistance, he joined with militants and intellectuals of this left wing socialist movement, the P.S.U. founded in 1960, an by politicians including el Rocard. On 13 February 1962, he spoke at Père Lachaise, on behalf of the F.E.N. to denounce fascism and the plasticages, at a time when protestors were being killed.

Convinced that for each of us, the decisive moments are most often strictly personal and are nothing for others, at best a number in a statistic. Even limiting ourselves to general facts, those who have directly suffered the impact did not keep the same memory of it as those who, partially or totally, escaped it.

More than fifty years later, he still had "the rather pleasant memory of a somewhat crazy night, when we had the somewhat exhilarating feeling of weighing in on the outcome of the war, but also an appreciable lesson on what the history records, on the ingratitude, vanity and pettiness of certain great men."

He died on 16 October 2000, at the age of 87, in Maisons-Laffitte.
