= Free corps =

European volunteer military units

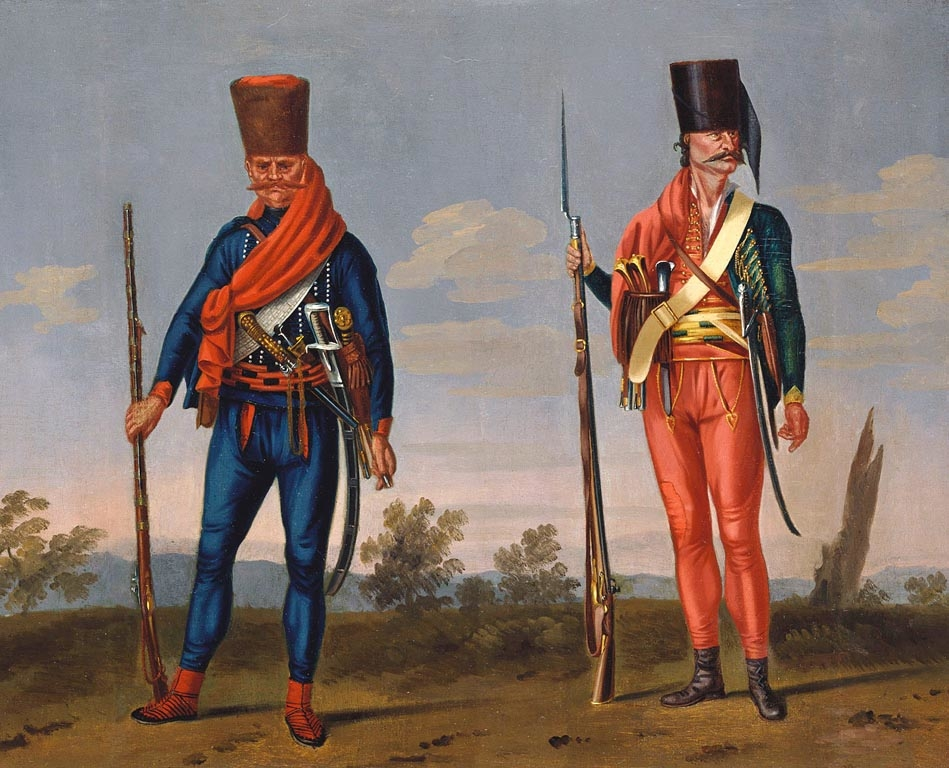
c. 1748 painting of soldiers of two Austrian Freikorps units

Freikorps (German: [ˈfʁaɪˌkoːɐ̯], "Free Corps" or "Volunteer Corps") were irregular German and other European paramilitary volunteer units that existed from the 18th to the early 20th centuries. They effectively served as mercenaries or private military companies, regardless of their own nationality. In German-speaking countries, the first so-called Freikorps ("free regiments", Freie Regimenter) were formed in the 18th century from native volunteers, enemy renegades, and deserters. These sometimes exotically equipped units served as infantry and cavalry (or, more rarely, as artillery); sometimes in just company strength and sometimes in formations of up to several thousand strong. There were also various mixed formations or legions. The Prussian von Kleist Freikorps included infantry, jäger, dragoons and hussars. The French Volontaires de Saxe combined uhlans and dragoons.

== Origins ==
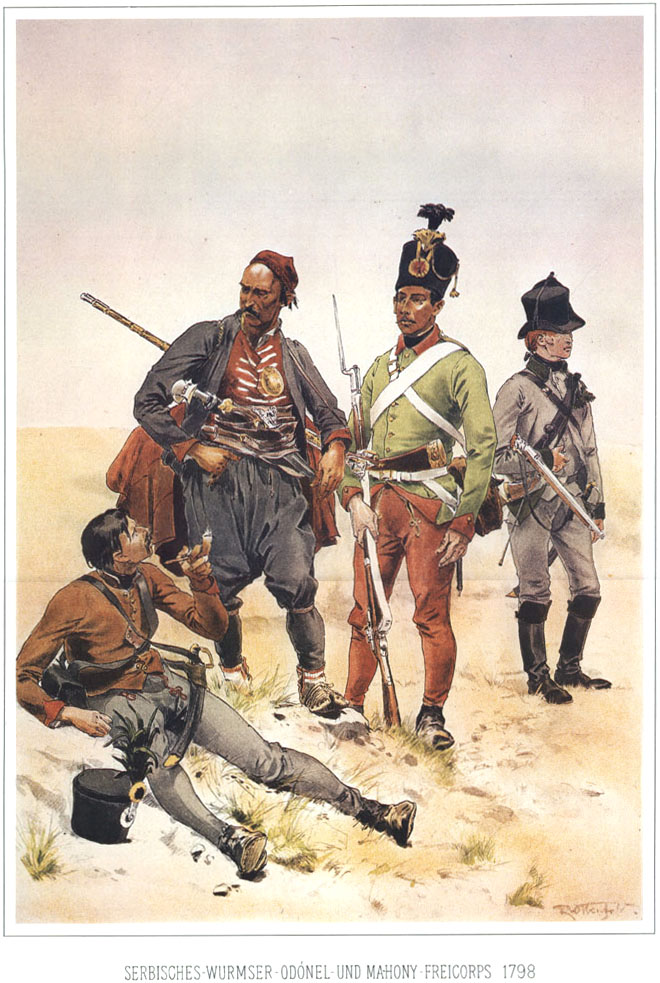
Serbian, Wurmser, Odonel, and Mahony Free Corps in 1798

The first Freikorps appeared during the War of the Austrian Succession and especially during the Seven Years' War, when France, Prussia, and the Habsburg monarchy embarked on an escalation of petty warfare while conserving their regular regiments. Even during the last Kabinettskrieg, the War of the Bavarian Succession, Freikorp formations were formed in 1778. Germans, Hungarians, Poles, Lithuanians, and South Slavs, as well as Turks, Tatars and Cossacks, were believed by all warring parties to be inherently good fighters. The nationality of many soldiers can no longer be ascertained, as the ethnic origin was often described imprecisely in the regimental lists. Slavs (Croats, Serbs) were often referred to as "Hungarians" or just "Croats", and Muslim recruits (Albanians, Bosnians, Tatars) as "Turks".

Inspired by the Slavic troops in Austrian service, France, the Dutch Republic, and other nations began employing "Free Troops", usually consisting of infantry and cavalry units. The Dutch Republic employed several "Vrij compagnieën" (Free Companies), raised between 1745 and 1747 and composed of volunteers and French deserters, such as the Walloon Grenadier Company. Although mostly used for reconnaissance and harassing enemy columns, the companies were organised into a battalion and fought at Wouw and in the Battle of Lauffelt. Some companies were accompanied by a company of Dragons or Hussars, such as Roodt's Company and Cornabé's Legion. And in late 1747, a French mining company was captured and brought into the service of the Republic.

France also extensively used Free Companies and Legions. At the Battle of Fontenoy, deployment of the British attack column was hampered by the French 'Harquebusiers de Grassins'. After the Battle of Lauffelt, French light troops pursued the retreating allies, but were engaged in a bloody guerrilla war with Austrian and Dutch light troops and Free Companies for the remainder of the campaign.

For Prussia, the Pandurs, who were made up of Croats and Serbs, were a clear model for the organization of such "free" troops. On 15 July 1759, Frederick the Great ordered the creation of a squadron of volunteer hussars to be attached to the 1st Hussar Regiment (von Kleist's Own). He entrusted the creation and command of this new unit to Colonel Friedrich Wilhelm von Kleist. This first squadron (80 men) was raised in Dresden and consisted mainly of Hungarian deserters. This squadron was placed under the command of Lieutenant Johann Michael von Kovacs. At the end of 1759, the first four squadrons of dragoons (also called horse grenadiers) of the Freikorps were organised. They initially consisted of Prussian volunteers from Berlin, Magdeburg, Mecklenburg, and Leipzig, but later recruited deserters. The Freikorps were regarded as unreliable by regular armies, so they were used mainly as sentries and for minor duties. During the war, 14 "free infantry" (Frei-Infanterie) units were created, mainly between 1756 and 1758, which were intended to be attractive to those soldiers who wanted military "adventure", but did not want to have to do military drill. A distinction should be made between the Freikorps formed up to 1759 for the final years of the war, which operated independently and disrupted the enemy with surprise attacks, and the free infantry, which consisted of various military branches (such as infantry, hussars, dragoons, jäger) and were used in combination. They were often used to ward off Maria Theresa's Pandurs. In the era of linear tactics, light troops were considered necessary for outpost, reinforcement, and reconnaissance duties. During the war, eight such volunteer corps were set up:

- Trümbach's Freikorps (Voluntaires de Prusse) (FI)
- Kleist's Freikorps (FII)
- Glasenapp's Free Dragoons (F III)
- Schony's Freikorps (F IV)
- Gschray's Freikorps (F V)
- Bauer's Free Hussars (F VI)
- Légion Britannique (FV – of the Electorate of Hanover)
- Volontaires Auxiliaires (F VI).

Because of some exceptions, they were seen as undisciplined and less battleworthy; they were used less for onerous guard and garrison duties. In the so-called "petty wars", the Freikorps interdicted enemy supply lines with guerrilla warfare. In the case of capture, their members were at risk of being executed as irregular fighters. In Prussia, the Freikorps, which Frederick the Great had despised as "vermin", were disbanded. Their soldiers were given no entitlement to pensions or invalidity payments.

In France, many corps continued to exist until 1776. They were attached to regular dragoon regiments as jäger squadrons. During the Napoleonic Wars, Austria recruited various Freikorps of Slavic origin. The Slavonic Wurmser Freikorps fought in Alsace. The combat effectiveness of the six Viennese Freikorps (37,000 foot soldiers and cavalrymen), however, was low. An exception were the border regiments of Croats and Serbs who served permanently on the Austro-Ottoman border.

The Serbian Free Corps was established in 1788 and was used in the Austro-Turkish War (1788–1791).

== Napoleonic era ==
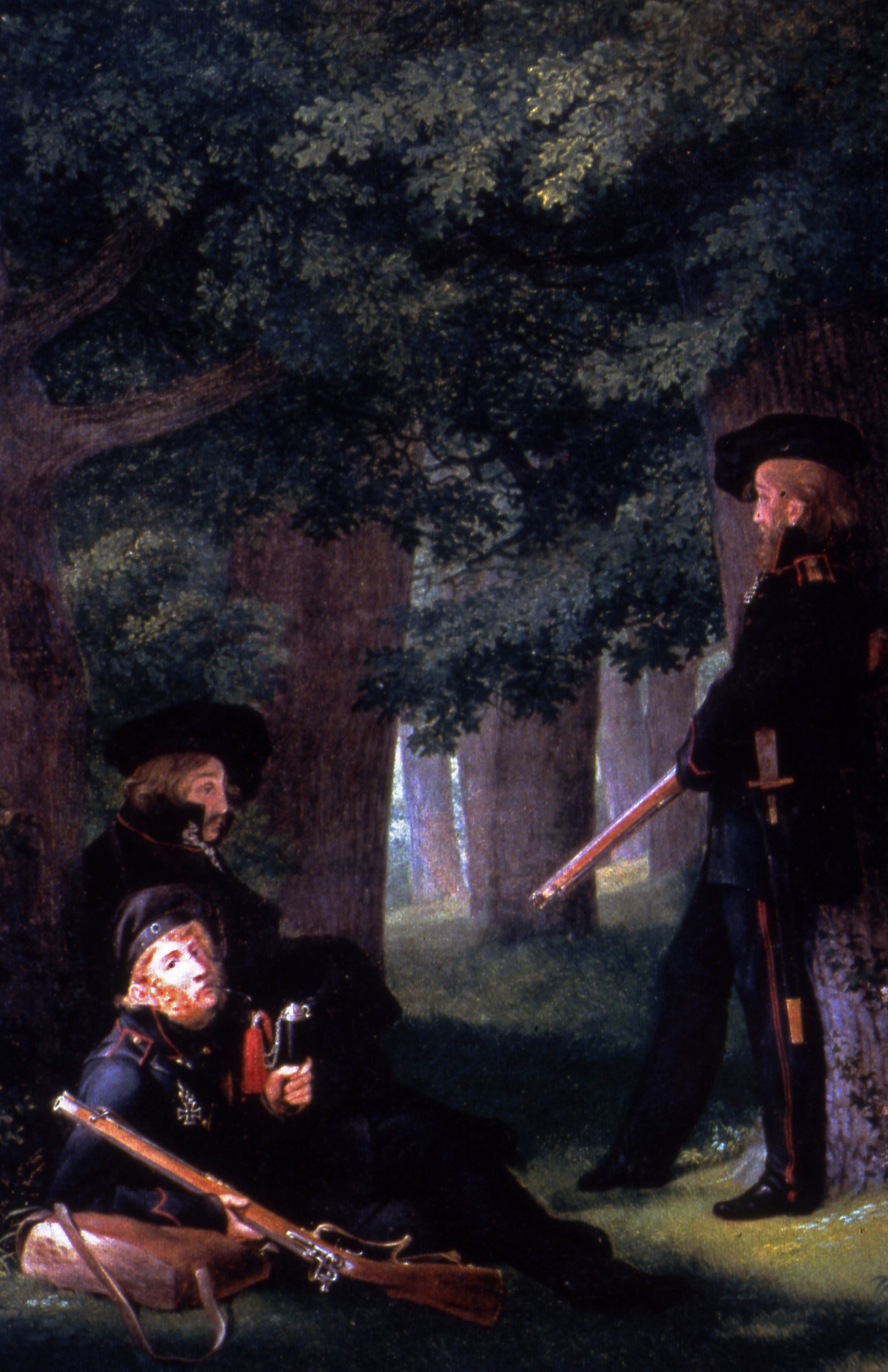
Painting of three famous Free Corps members in 1815: Heinrich Hartmann, Theodor Körner, and Friedrich Friesen

During Napoleon's 1812 invasion of Russia, the hussar Denis Davydov, a warrior-poet, formed volunteer partisan detachments functioning as Freikorps during the French retreat from Moscow. These irregular units operated in conjunction with Field Marshal Mikhail Kutuzov's regular Russian Imperial Army and Ataman Matvei Platov's Cossack detachments, harassing the French supply lines and inflicting defeats on the retreating Grande Armée in the battles of Krasnoi and the Berezina.

In the modern sense, the Freikorps emerged in Germany during the Napoleonic Wars. They fought not so much for money but for patriotic reasons, seeking to shake off the French Confederation of the Rhine. After the French under Emperor Napoleon had either conquered the German states or forced them to collaborate, remnants of the defeated armies continued to fight on in this fashion. Famous formations included the King's German Legion, which had fought for Britain in French-occupied Spain and was mainly recruited from Hanoverians; the Lützow Free Corps and the Black Brunswickers.

The Freikorps attracted many nationally disposed citizens and students. Freikorps commanders such as Ferdinand von Schill, Ludwig Adolf Wilhelm von Lützow, or Frederick William, Duke of Brunswick-Wolfenbüttel, known as the "Black Duke", led their own attacks on Napoleonic occupation forces in Germany. Those led by Schill were decimated in the Battle of Stralsund (1809); many were killed in battle or executed at Napoleon's command in the aftermath. The Freikorps were very popular during the German War of Liberation (1813–15), during which von Lützow, a survivor of Schill's Freikorps, formed the Lützow Free Corps. The anti-Napoleonic Freikorps frequently conducted operations behind French lines, functioning as a form of commando or guerrilla force.

Throughout the 19th century, these anti-Napoleonic Freikorps were widely praised and glorified by German nationalists, and a heroic myth was built around their exploits. This myth was invoked, in considerably different circumstances, in the aftermath of Germany's defeat in World War I, then misused by the Third Reich.

France later raised its own free corps. On 5 January 1814, at the start of the invasion of France, Napoleon decreed the formation of corps francs for territorial defense in the border departments. They were dissolved by an ordinance of Louis XVIII on 15 April 1814. The corps francs were restored on 22 April 1815, following Napoleon's return to power, and participated in the defense of France during the Hundred Days. Louis XVIII again dissolved them on 20 July 1815.

=== Freikorps poetry ===
The anti-Napoleonic guerrilla movements in Germany, Russia, and Spain in the early 1810s also produced their own style of poetry, hussar poetry or Freikorps poetry, written by soldier-poets. In Germany, Theodor Körner, Max von Schenkendorff, and Ernst Moritz Arndt were the most famous soldier-poets from the Freikorps. Their lyrics were, for the most part, patriotic, republican, anti-monarchical, and anti-French. In Russia, the leader of the guerrilla army, Davydov, invented the genre of hussar poetry, characterised by hedonism and bravado. He used events from his own life to illustrate such poetry. Later, when Mikhail Lermontov was a junker (cadet) in the Russian Imperial Army, he also wrote such poetry.

== World War II ==
=== Nazi Germany ===
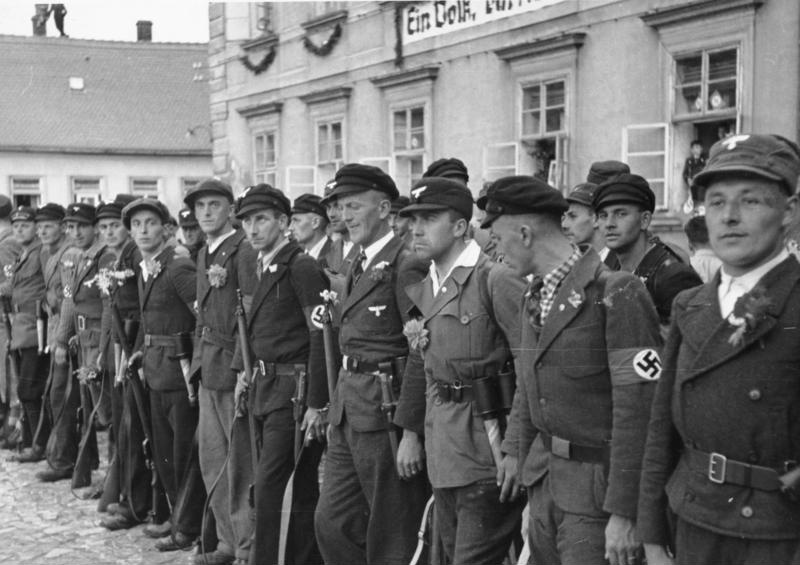
Sudetendeutsches Freikorps members

During World War II, there existed certain armed groups loyal to Germany that went under the name "Freikorps". These include:

- Sudetendeutsches Freikorps, a German nationalist paramilitary that fought against Czechoslovakia for annexation of the Sudetenland into Germany.
- Free Corps Denmark, a Danish volunteer collaborationist group in the Waffen-SS that was founded by the National Socialist Workers' Party of Denmark, and participated in the invasion of the Soviet Union.
- British Free Corps, a Waffen-SS unit made up of former British Commonwealth prisoners of war.
- Freikorps Sauerland
- Sabotage groups in Poland, active during the German invasion of Poland

=== France ===
In France, a similar group (but unrelated to the Freikorps) was the "Corps Franc". Starting in October 1939, the French Army raised many Corps Franc units with the mission of carrying out ambush, raid, and harassing operations forward of the Maginot Line during the period known as the Phoney War (Drôle de Guerre). They were tasked with attacking German troops guarding the Siegfried Line. Future Vichy collaborationist, Anti-Bolshevik and SS Major Joseph Darnand was one of the more famous participants in these commando actions.

In May 1940, the experience of the Phoney War-era Corps Franc was an influence in creating the Groupes Francs Motorisé de Cavalerie (GFC) who played a storied role in the delaying operations and last stands of the Battle of France, notably in the defenses of the Seine and the Loire. Between April and September 1944, the Corps Franc de la Montagne Noire unit operated as part of the French Resistance.

==== Corps Francs d'Afrique ====
On 25 November 1942, in the immediate aftermath of the Allied Invasion of Vichy French North Africa the Corps Francs d'Afrique (CFA) (African Corps Franc) was raised in French Morocco within the Free French Forces by General Giraud. Giraud drew the members of the all-volunteer unit from residents of Northern Africa of diverse religious backgrounds (Christian, Jew, and Muslim) and gave them the title of Vélite, a name inspired by the elite light infantry of Napoleon's Imperial Guard, who were named after the Roman Velites. Much of the Corps was drawn from Henri d'Astier de la Vigerie and José Aboulker's Géo Gras French Resistance Group which had been responsible for the Algiers Insurrection where the Resistance seized control of Algiers on the night of 8 November 1942 in coordination with the Allied landings happening that same night. In taking over Algiers, they managed to capture both Admiral Darlan and General Juin, which led to the Darlan Deal wherein Vichy French forces came over to the Allied side. Darlan was later assassinated by Fernand Bonnier de La Chapelle, an early member of the Corps Francs d'Afrique. They functioned as the Free French equivalent to the British Commandos. The Corps also included many Spanish and international veterans of the Spanish Republican Army, who had sought refuge in Northern Africa in 1939.

The Corps Francs d'Afrique, under the command of Joseph de Goislard de Monsabert, went on to fight Rommel's Afrikakorps in Tunisia with the U.S. 5th Army. They fought alongside the British 139th Brigade at Kassarine and Sidi Nasr, where they famously conducted a heroic bayonet charge, facing two to one odds, against the Italian 34th Battalion of the 10th Bersaglieri near the mountain of Kef Zilia on the road to Bizerte, taking 380 prisoners, killing the Italian battalion commander, and capturing the plans for Operation Ausladung. They participated in the capture of Bizerte in May 1943.

For its actions, the Corps Franc d'Afrique was awarded the Croix de Guerre.

The CFA formally was dissolved on 9 July 1943, with its members and equipment forming the corps of the newly created African Commando Group (GCA) on 13 July 1943 in Dupleix, Algeria, today seen as a forebear to the postwar Parachutist Shock Battalions and the modern day 13th RDP. The GCA went on to fight at Pianosa, Elba, Salerno, Provence, Belfort, Giromagny, Alsace, Cernay, Guebwiller, Buhl, and the Invasion of Germany.

== See also ==
- Free company, medieval units with some similarities
- Landsknecht
- List of Free Corps
