= Bernard Karsenty =

French soldier (1920–2007)

- Born: May 14, 1920; Oran, French Algeria
- Died: January 10, 2007 (aged 86); Puteaux, France
- Military career
- Branch: France
- Unit: Free France
- Commands: Algiers putsch of 1942
- Conflicts: Second World War
- Awards: Médaille de la Résistance

Bernard Karsenty (14 June 1920 in Oran, French Algeria – 10 January 2007 in Puteaux, France), was a member of the French Resistance during World War II. He was a leader of the Algiers putsch of 1942.

== Background ==
He spent his youth in Paris, and then entered the cours Simon, one of Paris' most prestigious theatrical institutions, to become an actor. As a soldier in the French Army, he was defeated at Marseilles in June 1940, where he took heed of General Charles de Gaulle's Appeal of 18 June.

== Entry into Resistance ==
He went to North Africa in November 1941, with the hope of being able to get to Gibraltar from there so he could rejoin the allied forces. However, on the spot, he joined a group of patriot Gaullists created by his cousins José Aboulker and Roger Carcassonne, then extended to certain people by Henri d'Astier de la Vigerie. A member of this very clandestine network, Karsenty recruited resistance members, sought weapons and endeavoured to convince fellow Vichy soldiers to join a possible allied invasion.

== Cherchell ==
He was one of the first organisers of the Cherchell meeting between resistance members and representatives of U.S. General Dwight D. Eisenhower, where he represented the resistance groups of Algiers. He stayed until the end, doing what was necessary, in spite of a wild sea, for putting afloat the kayak of General Clark, an associate of Eisenhower, allowing him to join his submarine before daybreak.

== Seizure of Algiers ==
He participated in the Putsch of 8 November 1942, as the assistant of José Aboulker. In this operation, 400 resistant civilians arrested the Vichyist commander in chief General Juin, as well as Admiral Darlan, and succeeded in neutralising the 19th Vichy Army Corps for about 15 hours, which allowed the allied forces to carry out the Torch Operation, in which they unloaded unopposed, who then encircled Algiers and seized it the very same day. Assisting José Aboulker during the operation, he only arrested several of Darnand's soldiers, who had approached the central Police station too closely. He took part in two successive barrages on the Vichy defence circle of Algiers, to prevent the mobilization of the Vichyist forces from being carried out.

== The FFF ==
Karsenty then rejoined the Free French Forces in England and was named staff officer in Carlton Gardens. In May 1943, he returned to Algiers and prepared for the arrival of General Charles de Gaulle, along with Roger Carcassonne and the opponents of the resistance group Combat. Promoted to officer of Cherchell school, then to second lieutenant, he was assigned to the first Free French Division and went up to Colmar where he arrived in December 1944. Here he learned of the execution of his brother Gaby, an engineer and resistance member in Marseilles, and also of the deportation of his father.

He was then assigned to the Research Bureau of Lyon War Criminals.

Since the war Karsenty has founded and directed several companies.

His decorations were as follows:

- La rosette de la Médaille de la Résistance
- Medal of Freedom of the United States.

He is a holder of two quotations to his Military Cross, one given to him by General Charles de Gaulle and the other by Giraud.

Bernard Karsenty is the author of an article on "The companions of 8 November", published by Nouveaux Cahiers, n°31, 1972–1973.
