= Colette Aboulker-Muscat =

Algerian-born teacher and writer (1909-2003)

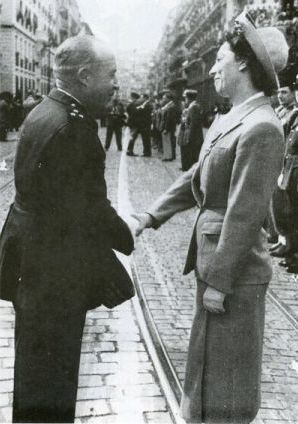
- Aboulker receiving the Croix de Guerre in Algiers, January 1948
- Born: Colette Béatrice Aboulker; 28 January 1909; Algiers, Algeria
- Died: 25 November 2003 (aged 94); Jerusalem, Israel
- Education: The Sorbonne
- Known for: Kabbalah, Imagery
- Spouses: Samuel Danan; Aryeh Muscat
- Children: 2
- Parents: Henri Samuel Aboulker (father); Berthe Bénichou-Aboulker (mother)
- Relatives: Jose Aboulker (brother)
- Family: Aboulker
- Awards: Yakir Yerushalayim (Worthy Citizen of Jerusalem), Croix de Guerre

Colette Béatrice Aboulker-Muscat (28 January 1909 – 25 November 2003) was a French teacher, writer, natural healer, and kabbalist whose focus was on the healing power of dream imagery. As a young woman, she took part in the Resistance movement in Vichy Algeria with her father Dr. Henri Samuel Aboulker and brother Jose Aboulker and, as a result, was awarded the Croix de Guerre in January 1948. She studied philosophy at the Sorbonne as well as psychology with French psychotherapist Robert Desoille, becoming interested in mental imagery and dream imagery, which would become her life's work. A practitioner of The Kabbalah of Light, in 1954 she moved to Jerusalem where she was honored with the Yakir Yerushalayim (Worthy Citizen of Jerusalem) award in 1995, and authored five books about the healing power of mental and dream imagery.

== Early life and education ==
Colette Béatrice Aboulker was born on 28 January 1909, in the city of Algiers in French Algeria. She was a member of the prominent Jewish-Algerian Aboulker family: her father, Henri Samuel Aboulker (1876–1957), was a noted neurosurgeon and Jewish community leader, her mother, Berthe Bénichou-Aboulker, was a poet and playwright, and her brother Jose Aboulker was a surgeon, a leading figure of the anti-Nazi resistance in Algeria during World War II, and the representative of the Resistance in Vichy Algeria at the French Committee of National Liberation in Paris from 1944 to 1945.

As members of the French resistance movement, she and her family were instrumental in helping American naval forces land in Algiers and she worked tirelessly for the release of her father, brother, and other members of the Jewish resistance who were rounded up and imprisoned after the assassination of the Vichy viceroy of North Africa, Admiral François Darlan. She also volunteered in a military hospital in Algiers and, as a result of both her heroism and service, was awarded the Croix de Guerre in January 1948.

After the war, she studied psychology in Paris at the Sorbonne, where she met French psychotherapist Robert Desoille and first became interested in mental imagery and dream imagery, which would become her life's work, going on to get a doctorate in philosophy as well. She served as President of the North African chapter of the Women's International Zionist Organization (WIZO).

In 1954, she moved to Israel with her second husband, Aryeh Muscat, formerly an emissary of the Jewish Agency in Algeria. Along with her own work, she was active in helping assimilate immigrants from North Africa, for which she was honored in 1995 with the title Yakir Yerushalayim ("Beloved of Jerusalem").

== The Kabbalah of Light ==
Aboulker-Muscat was a spiritual teacher in the tradition of the "Kabbalah of Light," tradition, also known as Merkavah or Chariot mysticism, described in the first 28 lines of the Book of Ezekiel. She was considered by her students and followers to be the 20th century representative of a lineage that had as practitioners Rabbis Isaac the Blind of Provence, France, and Jacob Ben Sheshet of Gerona, Spain in the 13th century.

Her legacy was continued by a broad range of practitioners including psychiatrist Gerald Epstein, founder of The Colette Aboulker-Muscat Center for Waking Dream Therapy (now The American Institute for Mental Imagery; Catherine Shainberg, founder of the School of Images; Canadian poet Carol Rose; Louise von Dardel (niece of Raoul Wallenberg) and Eve Ilsen, Rabbinic Pastor of the Aleph Alliance for Jewish Renewal, which her late husband Zalman Schachter-Shalomi was instrumental in founding.

Colette’s teaching also inspired Françoise Tibika of the Institute of Chemistry at the Hebrew University of Jerusalem. Her books on molecules and consciousness emerge from a synthesis of her academic research and the many years she devoted to studying with Colette.

== Personal life ==
She had two children with her first husband, Samuel Danan. Her second husband was Aryeh Muscat, a Russian-born lawyer who held the post of The Municipality Comptroller of the city of Jerusalem.

== Written works ==
- Life is not a Novel (2003, Black Jasmine, ISBN 0978880218)
- Mea Culpa: Tales of Resurrection (1997, ACMI Press, ASIN B0030K0188)
- Alone With the One: Poetry (2000, ACMI Press, ISBN 1883148014)
- Reversing Cancer through Mental Imagery Simcha H. Benyosef (Author), Colette Aboulker-Muscat (Contributor), Gerald N. Epstein (Foreword) (2017, ACMI Press, ISBN 188314809X)
- The Encyclopedia of Mental Imagery: Colette Aboulker-Muscat's 2,100 Visualization Exercises for Personal Development, Healing, and Self-Knowledge, by Barbarah L. Fedoroff, Gerald Epstein (2012, ACMI Press,ISBN 9781883148102)
