= List of free corps =

This is a list of free corps (German: Freikorps), various military and/or paramilitary units raised from the civilian population.

== Habsburg monarchy ==
- Free corps, pre-1754 German units
- Serbian Free Corps (1787–1792)
- Patriot militias, called Free Corps, in Austrian Netherlands

== Prussia ==
- Freiwilliges Feldjäger-Korps von Schmidt (1813–14), a volunteer riflemen corps that formed in late 1813
- Lützow Free Corps (1813–14), a voluntary force of the Prussian Army during the Napoleonic Wars

== Post World War I ==
- Freikorps Caspari
- Freikorps Epp
- Freikorps in the Baltic
- Freikorps Lichtschlag
- Freikorps Oberland

== World War II ==
- British Free Corps (BFC; German: Britisches Freikorps), in the Waffen-SS World War II
- Sudetendeutsches Freikorps, was a paramilitary fifth-columnist organisation formed by Czech German nationalists with Nazi sympathies
- Free Corps Denmark (1941–1943), Danish volunteer free corps created by the Danish Nazi Party (DNSAP)
- Freikorps Sauerland

== Other ==
- Exercitiegenootschap, private military and military training organisation in the 18th century Netherlands
- Schutterij, a voluntary city guard or citizen militia in the medieval and early modern Netherlands
- Munckska kåren, was a Swedish secret paramilitary group
- Volunteer unit “Freikorps”, a volunteer Ukrainian unit in the War in the Donbas and Russo-Ukrainian war

== Fictional ==
- In Shannara series of novels written by Terry Brooks, the Free Corps is a unit of the Border Legion of Callahorn and was led by Stee Jans; it appeared in The Elfstones of Shannara, helping to defend the Ellcrys against the Demons.
