= Aboulker =

Aboulker is a Jewish surname, historically mainly existing in Algiers.

The Aboulker family of Algiers originated in Spain. The name appears for the first time in the twelfth century as Ibn Pulguer in Toledo. The family left Spain after the Alhambra Decree, that expelled Jews from Spain in 1492, and settled in Algiers.

In Arabic, Abū ʾl-Khayr is a kunya (nickname) meaning « the father of the good », or a generous, fortunate man. In Portuguese, it morphed into Abulquerque.

In French, it became Aboulker. Over the centuries the family included numerous scholars, rabbis and grand rabbis, merchants, and physicians. A street in Algiers was named 'Rue du Dr Charles Aboulker', a doctor to the poor.

Notable people with the surname include:

- Berthe Bénichou-Aboulker (1888–1942), French Algerian poet and playwright
- Colette Béatrice Aboulker-Muscat (1909–2003) French Algerian resistance fighter, teacher, and kabbalist
- Isabelle Aboulker (born 1938), French composer
- José Aboulker (1920–2009), French Algerian resistance fighter and politician
- Marcel Aboulker (1905–1952), French screenwriter and film director.
- Pierre Aboulker (1906–1976), Professor of medicine, surgeon
