= Germain Jousse =

French General and Resistance leader (1895-1988)

- Born: November 20, 1895; Coulaines, France
- Died: March 21, 1988 (aged 92); Monblanc, France
- Military career
- Allegiance: France; Vichy France; Free France
- Branch: French Army
- Service years: 1914–1955, 1961-1962
- Rank: Général de corps d'armée
- Conflicts: World War I World War II: Operation Torch; Tunisian campaign
- Awards: Grand Cross of the Légion of Honor; Compagnon de la Libération; Croix de Guerre 1914–1918; Croix de Guerre 1939–1945; Order of the British Empire; Legion of Merit

Moïse Germain Louis Jousse (November 20, 1895, in Coulaines - March 21, 1988, in Monblanc), was a highly decorated officer in the French Army with the rank of Général de corps d'armée and a member of the French Resistance during World War II.

He refused to accept the defeat of France in 1940, he secretly took part in the establishment of a plan of allied intervention in North Africa while serving as staff officer of Vichy Army in Algiers. Jousse joined the Free French Army in November 1942 and held various staff positions in Charles de Gaulle's Army until the end of War.

Following the War, Jousse remained in the Army, served in various high command capacities and retired in 1955 as Général de corps d'armée (rough equivalent to three star lieutenant general). He was then recalled to active duty following a Algiers putsch of 1961 and served as Member of the Supreme Military Tribunal.

== World War I ==
In 1914 Germain Jousse conscripted into the army. Promoted to second lieutenant in June 1915, he held the role of company commander from June 1916 and became lieutenant in November of the same year. Wounded at Saint-Dié on October 1, 1917, he rejoined his unit after one month of hospitalization having refused any recuperation. Promoted to captain in April 1918, he was decorated with the Légion d'honneur on the battlefield in September 1918, for having advanced to the position of Celles-sur-Aisne and for having destroyed an enemy company and capturing numerous prisoners.

== Military career between the wars ==
In 1919, he was sent to Turkey with the 412th Regiment to fight the 'Kémalistes'. Wounded on May 1, 1921, he was made prisoner after hard combat and only returned to France in 1922. In 1925 he was allowed into the École supérieure de guerre, and he then served in Algeria. In 1935 he was promoted to major and transferred to Kabylie with the 9th Regiment of Zouaves until 1938. In August 1939 he joined his station of mobilization as Chief of the 3rd Office of the Staff of the Commander in chief of the Theatre of operations of North Africa. In June 1940 with the High Command, he vainly proposed various solutions for the continuation of the fight against Germany, which he considered possible in North Africa. He was then transferred, still as Chief of the 3rd Office to the Staff of the 19th Army Corps of Algiers.

== Entry into resistance ==
In spring 1941, continuing to refuse defeat, he secretly took part in the establishment of a plan of allied intervention in North Africa, with some comrades from the circles of General Maxime Weygand and Marshal Philippe Pétain. Others like him such as Captain Beaufre and the commanders Dartois and Loustanau-Lacau were denounced, arrested and executed. He himself only just escaped from the same fate. Promoted to the rank of lieutenant-colonel in September 1941, he did not discontinue to work for the resistance in secret, by drawing up notes evaluating the technical bases for a future allied invasion of North Africa. In January 1942, he became military adviser to the Algiers resistant group directed by Henri d'Astier de la Vigerie and José Aboulker. In disgrace, under Vichy orders he was put in control of regulating supply transport bound for the Rommel army, in accordance with the agreements passed through the general delegation of Weygand and Germany (Dankworth Contract). He benefitted from it as he was able to provide information for the allied secret services, all the while endeavouring to slow down and block the transports bound for the Afrika Korps.

== Contribution to the Putsch of November 8, 1942 and the Torch Operation ==
From, June 1942, appointed Garrison Major in Algiers, Colonel Jousse actively prepared for the Algiers uprising, storing weapons and contributing to choosing the locations which would be occupied. On October 16, 1942, Jousse took part in the Operation Flagpole, a top-secret high-level meeting between U.S. General Mark W. Clark, representing the Allies, and Général Charles E. Mast, the leader of a group of pro-Allied Vichy France officers in French North Africa, to secure their cooperation with the invasion.

He himself took part in the execution of the November 8 Putsch and opposing the Vichyist 'plan of the maintenance of law and order' which was intended to be opposed to any invasion. Thus he would facilitate the occupation of strategic points by the resistance by providing them 'VP' arm-bands - 'Public Volunteers', with letters from the Public Commander destined for the military collaborationists, with mission orders to raise the state of security. He personally carried out the arrest of General Louis Koeltz, Commander of the Algerian 19th Army Corps, and went onto the battlefront to put an end to the fire of a resistance battalion protecting the invasion point of Sidi Ferruch for the American troops. The success of the putsch can be attributed to Germain Jousse, who allowed 400 armed civilians to arrest General Alphonse Juin, Commander in chief, as well as the collaborationist Admiral François Darlan, and who paralysed the mobilisation of the Vichyist 19th Army Corps during the 15 hours in which the Allied forces unloaded unopposed, encircled Algiers, and achieved surrender the same evening with its port intact.

== The end of the war ==
Colonel Jousse participated in the Tunisian Campaign within the General British Staff from November 1942 to March 1943. In April he was named the Chief of the Staff of General Georges Catroux in Algiers. Then promoted to Colonel, he became assistant manager of the Staff of General Charles de Gaulle in Algiers. He was then assigned to the Directorate-General of Studies and Research (DGÉR), where he took command of the documentation service. In 1944, he accepted his stars as Brigade General, and in 1946 was promoted to Division General.

== Career after the war ==
In January 1947, Jousse was appointed a Chief of Private General Staff to the Minister of National Defence, François Billoux, but after Billoux resignation in late May that year, Jousse was granted a one year leave. He returned to service in June 1948 and assumed duty as Assistant Commander-in-Chief of French Forces in Germany under General Augustin Guillaume.

Jousse was transferred back to France in May 1950 and assumed command of the 5th Military Region in Toulon, and, in July 1952, was promoted to the rank of Army Corps General. He remained in that capacity until his retirement from active duty on November 20, 1955.

Following a failed putsch of the generals in late April 1961, Jousse was recalled to active duty and served as a Member of the Supreme Military Tribunal during the trials with rebellious generals Raoul Salan, André Zeller, Edmond Jouhaud and Maurice Challe. He continued in this capacity until the end of May 1962, when he finally retired from the Army again.

== Death ==
Jousse then served as the first president of the Association of the French Liberation of November 8, 1942 and died on March 21, 1988, in Monblanc in Gers. He was buried in Mans dans la Sarthe.

== Decorations ==
His decorations were as follows:

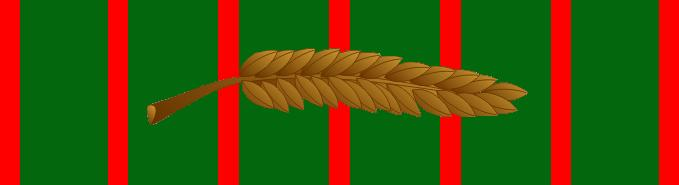
Legion of Honour, Grand Cross (1983)
Legion of Honour, Commander
Legion of Honour, Officer
Legion of Honour, Knight (April 1918)
Order of Liberation, Companion (October 30, 1943)
Croix de guerre 1939–1945 with Palm
Croix de guerre 1914–1918 with Palm
Croix de guerre TOE
Insignia for the Military Wounded (November 1917)
World War I Victory Medal
Combatant's Cross
Colonial Medal with Clasps Algeria and Tunisia
1914–1918 Commemorative War Medal
1939–1945 Commemorative War Medal
Commemorative medal for voluntary service in Free France
Order of the British Empire, Commander
Legion of Merit, Officer
Tunisian Order of Glory, Grand Officer
Moroccan Order of Ouissam Alaouite, Commander

== Publications ==
General Jousse also published two works:

- Considérations sur l'Armée de demain, Paris, 1946
- L'Armée Nationale, Paris 1947
