= Laurent Preziosi =

French partisan (1912–2010)

Laurent Preziosi (22 June 1912 - 5 November 2010) was a French Resistance member, most notable as one of the first four volunteers for Operation Pearl Harbour sent to Corsica on 11 December 1942 aboard the Casabianca to coordinate resistance networks ready for landings to liberate the island from German and Italian occupation.

== Life ==
=== Early life ===
He was born in Maison-Carrée in Algeria, to which his parents had moved from Taglio-Isolaccio on Corsica a year earlier. He embarked on a political career aged 18 by creating Maison-Carrée's section of "Jeunesses socialistes" before becoming secretary of the departmental federation created by his writer friend Max-Pol Fouchet. At the university of law and letters in Algiers his circle of friends included Yves Dechezelles and Albert Camus who he had already got to know through football matches (RCMC/RUA). He became a state school teacher.

From 1935 onwards he took part in the annual national congress of the "Jeunesses socialistes" and became an ardent backer of human rights. He took part in the 30 November 1938 general strike and was suspended from his job for six months as a result. He left the SFIO in 1938 to join PSOP, created by Marceau Pivert. He remained in PSOP until 1940. He found a job as editor to the newspaper Alger Républicain, whose chief editor was Pascal Pia. There he met Camus again, their friendship becoming unwavering.

=== Wartime ===
On the outbreak of war in September 1939 he was mobilised and he was sacked from state education in December 1940 for his participation in the 1938 strikes. He made contact with his lawyer friend Yves Dechezelles with whom he created an initial group resisting Vichy France. The police kept an eye on his activities and commissioner Préa gave him advance warning of his imminent arrest and internment in the Djeniene Bourezg camp, where many died of scurvy.

From there he left for Corsica via Marseille where his friend François Tomasino, previously responsible for the "Jeunesses socialistes" in Bouches-du-Rhône, proposed that Preziosi set up a fruit and vegetable export subsidiary for his society at 63 Boulevard Graziani in Bastia. On this journey Preziosi met many others keen to set up resistance networks, notably the mayor of Bastia, Hyacinthe de Montera, who had been sacked by the Vichy regime. Warned of a probable large-scale Allied invasion of North Africa, he returned there secretly and based himself in Oran, where he was unknown but could also meet Albert Camus on a daily basis.

From there he took part in Paul Ruff's Group D resistance operation on the 8 November 1942 coup, a key support of Operation Torch in Algiers.

=== Operation Pearl Harbour ===
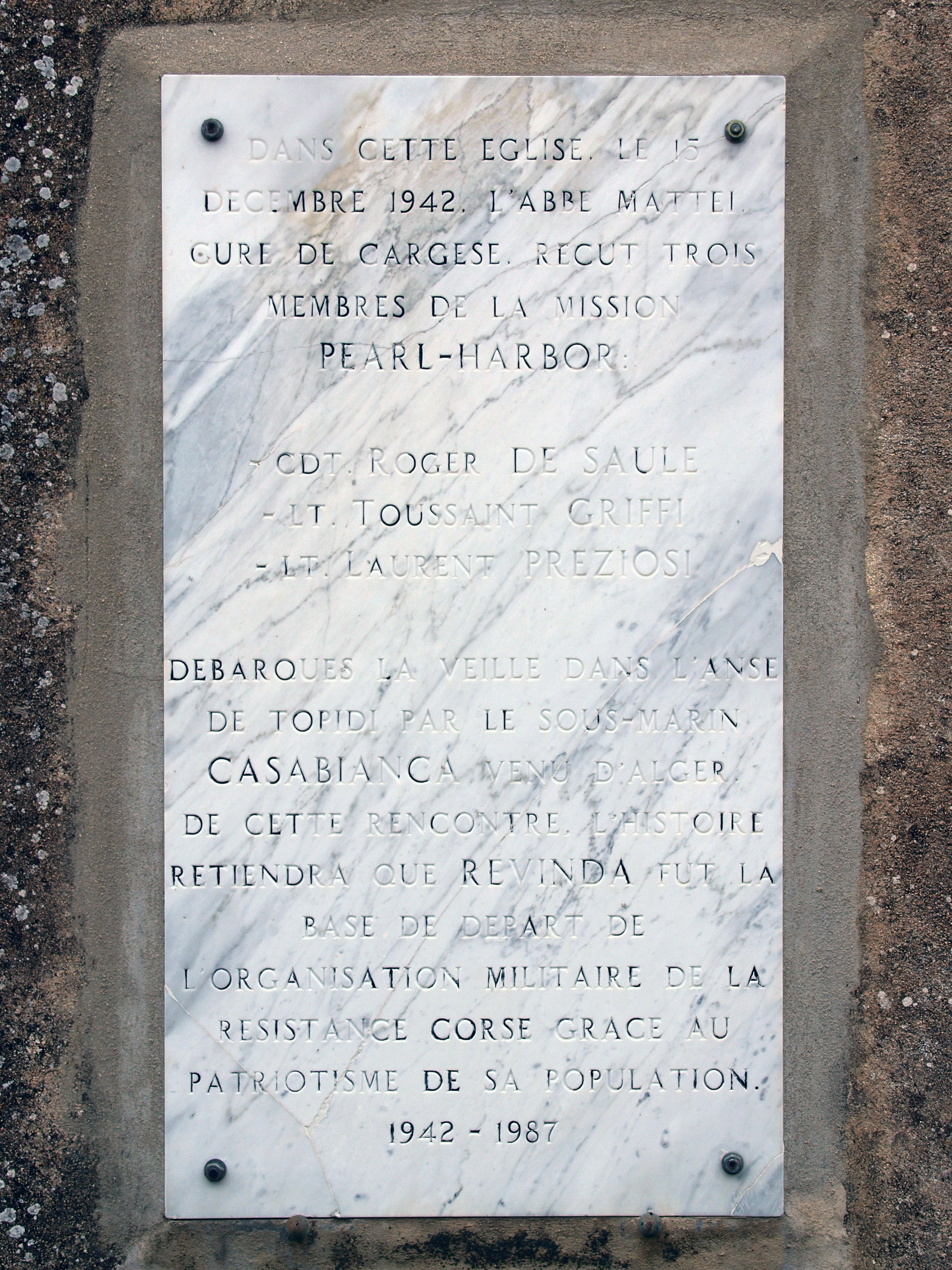
Plaque on Saint-Siméon church in Revinda (Marignana)

== Honours ==
- Médaille de la Résistance (awarded 31 March 1947)
- Croix de guerre with palm (awarded 15 April 1947).
- Croix de guerre with stars (awarded 15 April 1947)
- Médaille militaire (awarded 12 April 1954)
- Chevalier de la légion d'honneur (awarded 29 December 1962)
- Officier de l'ordre du mérite social (awarded 12 October 1963)
- Officier de la légion d'honneur (awarded 6 September 1983)
- Étoile Civique, gold medal

== Bibliography (in French) ==
- "Casabianca", Cdt L'Herminier, Éditions France Empire (1949),
- "Tous Bandits d'honneur!" Résistance et Libération en Corse, Maurice Choury, juin 1940 - octobre 1943, Éditions Sociales (1958),
- "Histoire de la Résistance en France", Henry Noguères, Éditions Robert Laffont (1972),
- "La Résistance en Corse", Colonel Remy, Éditions Famot, (1976)
- "En ce temps là Bastia", Dominique et E Salini, Éditions Siciliano (1978),
- "Albert Camus", Herbert R. Lottman, Éditions Seuil (1985),
- "Premiere mission en Corse occupée, avec le sous-marin Casabianca", Toussaint Griffi et Laurent Preziosi, Éditions L'Harmattan (1988),
- "Dictionnaire du Mouvement ouvrier", Jean Maitron, Les Éditions Ouvrières, (1991)
- "Marceau Pivert" Jacques Kergoat, Éditions de l'Atelier (1994)
- "Albert Camus, une vie" Olivier Todd, Éditions Gallimard (1996),
- "Et la Corse fut libérée", Paul Silvani, Éditions Albiani, (2001),
- "L'Algérie sous le régime de Vichy", Jacques Cantier, Éditions Odile Jacob, (2002),
- "L'armée en Résistance : France 1940-1944", Général de Boisfleury, Éditions Esprit du Livre (2006),
- Bulletin de l'ASSDN numero 120, Association des Anciens des Services Spéciaux de la Défense Nationale,
- Reportage Antenne 2 sur le 30e anniversaire de la Libération de la Corse (1993),
- Film documentaire FR3 de Xavier de Cassan "Le Casabianca"
- Film documentaire "Quand le maquis attend le printemps" (24/07/1974) INA
