= Louis Koeltz =

French military officer (1884–1970)

Louis Marie Koeltz (Besançon, 30 September 1884 – Paris, 27 May 1970) was a French Lieutenant General in World War II.

== Biography ==
Of Alsatian origin, Koeltz was born in Besançon, as his father, a brigadier in the gendarmerie, chose to leave Alsace-Lorraine which had become controlled by the Germans in 1871. He decided to obtain the French nationality in 1903, at the age of 18. He graduated from the École militaire in Paris in 1913. He then served as a general staff officer in World War I. From 1926 to 1935, Koeltz was employed in the intelligence service of the French General Staff and was appointed Brigadier General in 1937.

At the outbreak of World War II, he was Vice Chief of Operations at the Grand Quartier Général. Following the French capitulation, he became Director of the Services de l'Armistice on 25 June 1940. After joining the Vichy Army, he was promoted to Lieutenant General in May 1941 and in September, Koeltz was appointed commander of the 19th Military Region, which later became 19th Army Corps, and was stationed in French Algeria.

When the Allied forces landed in Algeria, Koeltz first refused to join the Allies, and was arrested during the night by Colonel Germain Jousse, the head of the 3rd office of his staff. He was released later that day, to take part in the Franco-American negotiations. The ceasefire was signed on 10 November 1942 at 10 a.m. He then participated with his Corps against the Germans and Italians in the Tunisian campaign, taking 31,000 prisoners in May 1943. On 30 September 1943, he was put into the reserve.

After the war, he was a government representative for France in the Allied Control Council (1945–1946) in occupied post-war Germany. In 1946, he was appointed Grand Officer of the Legion of Honor and discharged from the Army. He died at his home in Paris on 27 May 1970, and was buried in Essey-les-Nancy.

== Sources ==
- page from generals.dk
