= Bénichou =

Bénichou is a surname. Notable people with the surname include:

- Berthe Bénichou-Aboulker (1888–1942), French Algerian poet and playwright
- Fabrice Benichou (born 1966), French boxer
- Maurice Bénichou (1943–2019), French actor
- Paul Bénichou (1908–2001), French author
- Pierre Bénichou (born 1938), French journalist
