= José Aboulker =

Algerian Jewish resistance leader (1920–2019)

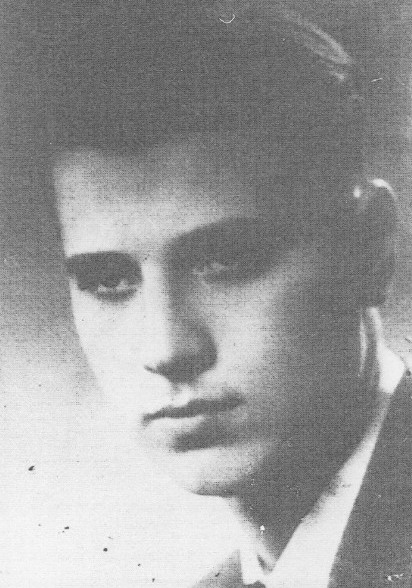
- Born: 5 March 1920; Algiers, French Algeria
- Died: 17 November 2009 (aged 89) Manosque, France

José Aboulker (5 March 1920 – 17 November 2009) was an Algerian Jew and the leader of the anti-Nazi resistance in French Algeria during World War II. He received the U.S. Medal of Freedom, the Croix de Guerre, and was made a Companion of the Liberation and a Commander of the Légion d'honneur. After the war, he became a neurosurgeon and a political figure in France, who advocated for the political rights of Algerian Muslims.

== Early life ==
Aboulker was born in Algiers into a Jewish family. His mother, Berthe Bénichou-Aboulker, was a celebrated poet and playwright. His father, Henri Aboulker, was a surgeon, professor in the Faculty of Medicine in Algiers and the leader of the local Zionist movement. The Bénichou family was one of the great Jewish families of Oran, where they owned a famous villa, equipped with its own synagogue. The Aboulker family of Algiers originated in Spain and, over the centuries, has included numerous scholars, rabbis, merchants, and physicians. A medical student at the outbreak of World War II, Aboulker was mobilized in April 1940 as an officer cadet. He was demobilized in February 1941.

== Algerian Resistance ==
In September 1940, Aboulker founded a resistance network in Algiers, in partnership with his cousin Roger Carcassonne who had done the same at Oran, and Aboulker subsequently became the main leader of the resistance movement in pro-Nazi Vichy Algeria.

The two cousins met Henri d'Astier de la Vigerie, with whom they prepared to support the expected Allied landings in North Africa, in collaboration with Colonel Germain Jousse and the U.S. Consul Robert Murphy, President Roosevelt's representative in Algiers. The headquarters for the preparation were at his father's house at 26 Rue Michelet.

On 23 October 1942, Aboulker was among the resistance leaders who met with General Mark Clark in Vichy Morocco. The Americans agreed to supply weapons and radios, which were landed on 5 November. On the night of the Allied landings in North Africa, 7 November 1942, Aboulker led the occupation of the main strategic points in Algiers by 400 members of the Resistance, seizing the central police station, with his deputy Bernard Karsenty and the help of Guy Calvet and Superintendent Achiary. “The underground numbered eight hundred fighters, half of them Jewish. But at the moment of truth, 400 of them had cold feet, and just 400 were left - almost all of them Jewish.

Led by their group leaders, all of the Resistance fighters, with the exception of the reserve officers, neutralized the command centers, occupied strategic positions, and stopped the military officials and civilian supporters of the Vichy government, starting with General General Alphonse Juin, the Commander-in-chief, and Admiral Admiral François Darlan.

In the morning, when the XIXth Army Corps of the Vichy Government tried to mobilize to oppose the Allied landings, it had to concentrate its efforts on the Resistance fighters rather than Allied forces. With the landings around Algiers having been completed, Aboulker—anxious not to spill French blood—asked the group leaders to evacuate their positions. Using Resistance fighters from the evacuated positions, he organized with the group leader, Captain Pillafort barricades to hinder the mobilization of the Vichy military. As a result, the forces of the Vichy government did not attack by that evening the central police station, the last place with insurgents. The confusion created by the so-called "putsch" of 8 November 1942 helped the Allies land almost without opposition and then encircle Algiers. Admiral Darlan surrendered Algiers that afternoon, and Allied troops entered the city at 8 pm.

On 24 December 1942, Darlan, who had named himself High Commissioner and maintained Vichy policies with the support of General General Henri Giraud, was killed by a 20-year-old monarchist, Fernand Bonnier de La Chapelle, who was executed on 26 December. Giraud succeeded Darlan and ordered the arrest of Aboulker and 26 other Resistance leaders for complicity in Darlan's assassination, and they were immediately deported to prison camps in southern Algeria.

== Metropolitan Resistance ==
Freed following the Casablanca Conference in 1943, Aboulker travelled to London in May 1943 and joined the Free French.

In October of that year, he was sent secretly into occupied France, as someone "responsible for the organization of the health service of the Resistance movement", preparing for the Liberation. There, he led operations parachuting surgical equipment into France.

Back in London in June 1944, he returned to Algiers, where he had his medical school viva.

In August 1944, he left for a new mission in the south of France, to install prefects at Toulouse, Limoges, and Clermont-Ferrand.

== Peacetime ==
Aboulker was the representative of the Resistance in Vichy Algeria at the French Committee of National Liberation in Paris from 1944 to 1945. He proposed changing the electoral law in French Algeria to allow the election of native Muslim deputies, who had never previously been admitted. The proposal was adopted.

After the war, Aboulker joined the French Communist Party, and in 1946 he resumed his medical studies. He passed the internal examinations at the American Hospital of Paris and finally became a professor of neurosurgery.

He committed himself to Algeria's independence and opposed the return of General de Gaulle as head of the French government in 1958. Taking into account de Gaulle's role in dismantling the French empire, including Algeria, Aboulker voted in 1965 for his reelection as President of the Republic. He belonged to the emergency medical service set up for the president of the Republic following the assassination attempt made at Le Petit-Clamart. In June 1999, Aboulker became a member of the Liberation Council.

He died on 17 November 2009.

== Decorations ==
- Commander of the Légion d'honneur
- Companion of the Liberation
- Croix de guerre 1939-1945 (3 citations)
- U.S. Medal of Freedom

== Bibliography ==
- Professeur Yves Maxime Danan,La vie politique à Alger, de 1940 à 1944, L.G.D.J., Paris 1943.
- Professeur José Aboulker et Christine Levisse-Touzé, 8 novembre 1942 : Les armées américaine et anglaise prennent Alger en quinze heures, Paris, Espoir, n° 133, 2002.
