= Monblanc =

- Commune
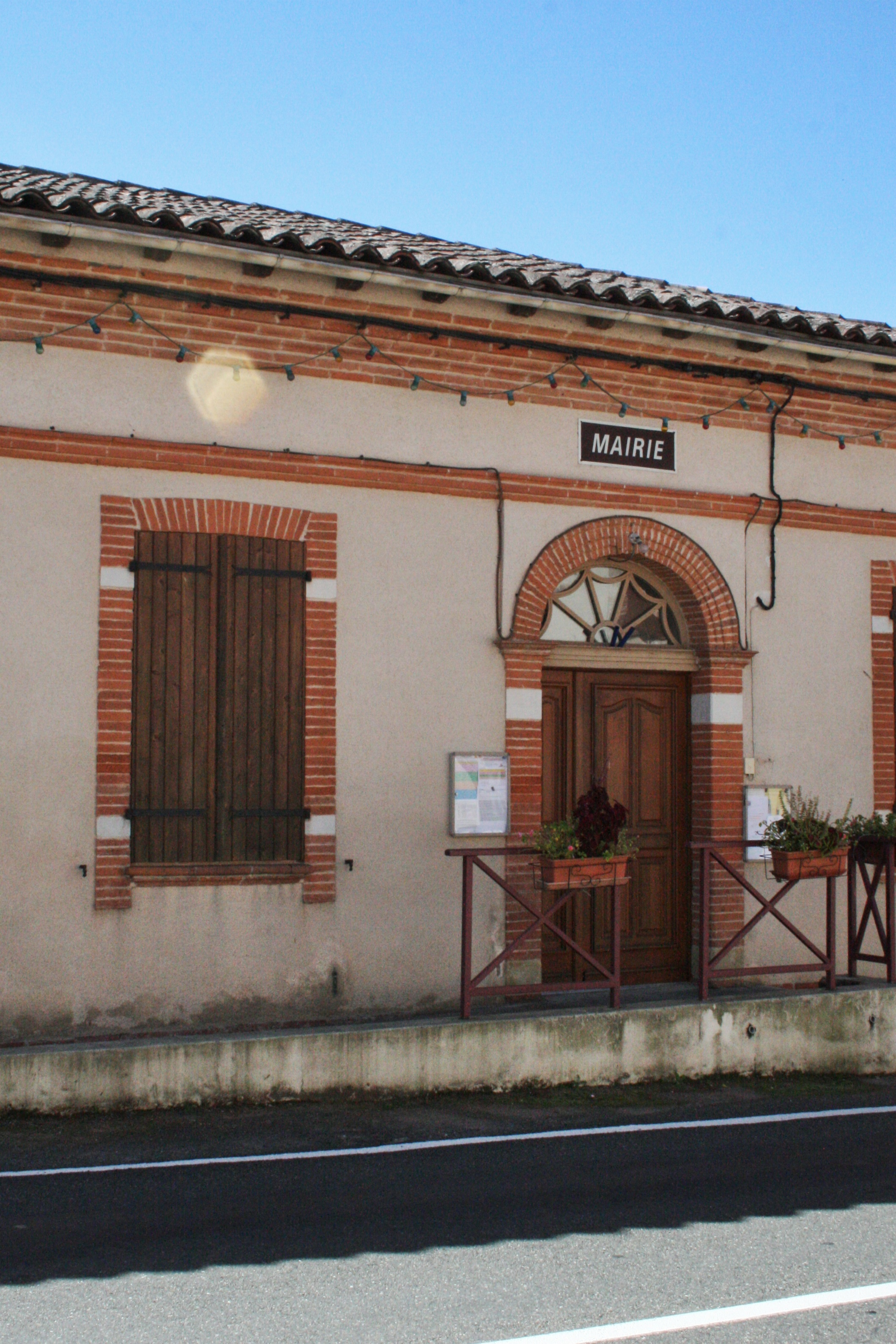
- The town hall
- Location of Monblanc
- Location within France Location within Occitanie
- Coordinates: 43°27′54″N 0°59′28″E
- Country: France
- Region: Occitania
- Department: Gers
- Arrondissement: Auch
- Canton: Val de Save
- Intercommunality: Savès

Government
  - Mayor (2020–2026): Alain Gateau
- Area^{1}: 12.93 km^{2} (4.99 sq mi)
- Elevation: 235 m (771 ft)
- Highest elevation: 306 m (1,004 ft)
- Lowest elevation: 162 m (531 ft)
- Population (2023): 394
  - Density: 30.5/km^{2} (78.9/sq mi)
- Time zone: UTC+01:00 (CET)
  - Summer (DST): UTC+02:00 (CEST)
- INSEE/Postal code: 32261 /32130
- ^{1} French Land Register data, which excludes lakes, ponds, glaciers > 1 km^{2} (0.386 sq mi or 247 acres) and river estuaries.

Monblanc (French pronunciation: [mɔ̃blɑ̃]; Occitan: Montblanc) is a commune in the Gers department in southwestern France.

== Geography ==
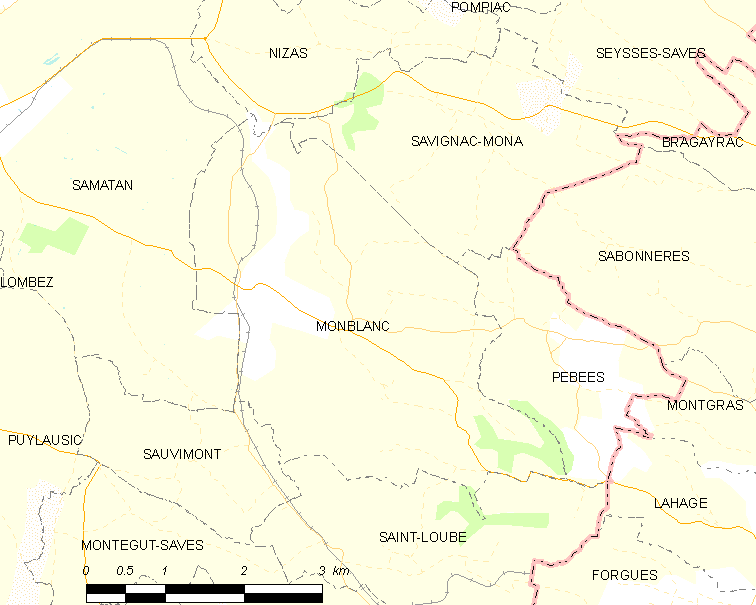
Monblanc and its surrounding communes

== Population ==
Historical population
Year	Pop.	±% p.a.
1968	288	—
1975	270	−0.92%
1982	276	+0.31%
1990	251	−1.18%
1999	286	+1.46%
2007	348	+2.48%
2012	370	+1.23%
2017	351	−1.05%
2023	394	+1.94%
Source: INSEE

== See also ==
- Communes of the Gers department
- Savès
