= Roger Carcassonne =

French Resistance leader (1911-1991)

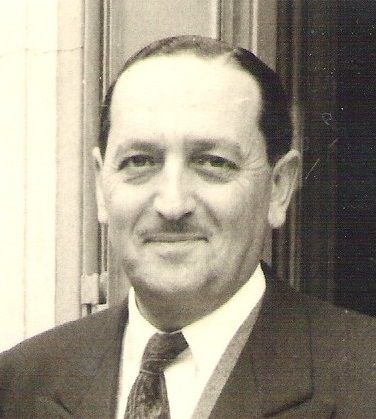
Roger Carcassonne

Roger Carcassonne-Leduc (12 January 1911 in Marnia – 10 December 1991 in Paris, France) was a member of the French Resistance.

A French industrialist in Oran, he served as a second lieutenant with the 8th Regiment. Sent to Tunisia, at the time of the armistice he appeared in front of the military justice for having posted and distributed the texts of the call of June 18 from General Charles de Gaulle.

== Foundation of Oran Resistance ==
Transferred with his unit to Oran, Carcassonne was demobilized on 28 August 1940. He sought immediately, with his brother Pierre Carcassonne, to go to Great Britain via Gibraltar. But this was in vain, because the Vichy French police and naval service were very observant. Severe judgments rained down on those who were arrested trying to escape.

He then organized, with the help of his brother Pierre and some friends, including Captain Louis Jobelot, a group which was devoted to producing discreet propaganda and tried to gather everyone possible.

In March 1941, in Oran, Captain Jobelot introduced him to Henri d'Astier de la Vigerie, an officer in the Deuxième Bureau of the Armistice Army, with whom he immediately sympathized. After some interviews, the two men decided to create a movement, and intended to gather all those who wanted to fight against the Germans.

== Co-operation with the Algiers resistance ==
Roger and Pierre Carcassonne continued recruiting resistance fighters and coordinating resistance forces and intelligence agents.

In August 1941, in Algiers, Carcassonne met his cousin José Aboulker, a medical student, who had begun resistance in September 1940. The two men decided to keep up to date with their activities, but without combining their respective organizations.

Carcassonne in Oran (under the pseudonym of Leduc) and Aboulker in Algiers continued their activities, which were centred on forming an armed group and military and civilian information centres. They did not engage in propaganda, considering it to have little effect but likely to draw the attention of the Vichy authorities.

In 1942, Carcassonne sent his brother to Algiers to introduce Aboulker to d'Astier de la Vigerie. He also dealt with the expenses of the Oran group and financed the organization of the resistance for all North Africa.
