= Géo Gras Group =

WW II French resistance group

The Géo Gras Group was a French resistance movement that played a decisive role during Operation Torch, the British-American invasion of French North Africa during World War II.

Formed October 1940 in Algiers, the group recruited Jews and French Army officers opposed to Vichy France.

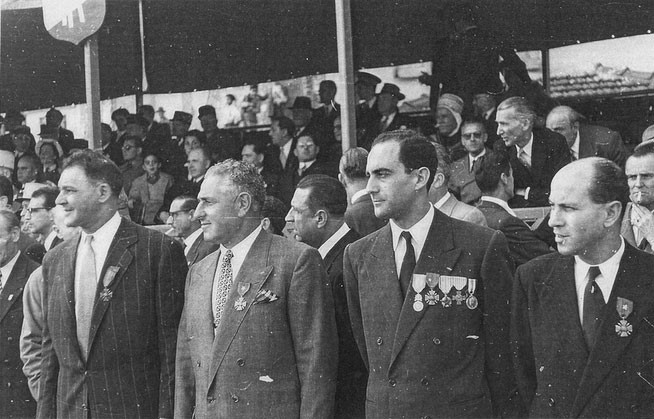
Croix de Guerre award ceremony in Algiers; from right to left: Charles Bouchara, Paul Sebaoun, Emile Atlan

When the Allies invaded French North Africa, the Group provided a third of the Resistance fighters during the capture of Algiers.

== Origin and operation ==
The abolition of the Marchandeau Decree on August 16, 1940, allowed the ultra-right French Popular Party led by Jacques Doriot to maintain anti-Semitic unrest in Algiers. The windows of Jewish-owned stores were smashed during the night of 11 September 1940. On 7 October 1940, the Vichy regime rescinded the Crémieux Decree of 1870, a law that gave French citizenship to Algerian Jews. 120,000 Algerian Jews were stripped of their French citizenship and were from then on considered "indigenous Israelites". As such, Jews were excluded them from major public office, the military, and professions in the press, cinema, radio, and theater. LICRA members André Temime and Emile Atlan, together with Charles Bouchara and Paul Sebaoun, formed a pro-Allied resistance group. The group gathered in a gym on Government Square (now Martyrs Square) in Algiers. There they trained with Géo Gras, a former French military boxing champion, and practiced a range of fighting techniques such as boxing, fencing, and judo. Gras was unaware of his students' resistance activities. Unbeknownst to him, weapons were hidden under the ring and beneath the floorboards of the room. The organization was structured on a French military model, consisting of half-companies of sixty members divided into thirty member platoons and five member fire teams. Among its leaders were Fernand Aïch, Roger Albou, Émile Atlan, Charles Bouchara, Jean Gamzon, Jean Gozlan, André Levy, Germain Libine (future special guard of General De Gaulle), George Loufrani, Roger Morali, André Temime, and general counsel Raphaël Aboulker, cousin of José Aboulker. Reserve officers Lieutenant Jean Dreyfus, Lieutenant Fernand Fredj, Lieutenant Roger Jais, officer aspirant Jacques Zermati, and Roger Carcassonne (an industrialist from Oran) joined the organization. The first actions were focused on anti-Vichy propaganda, recruitment, and the purchase of smuggled weapons. An initial stock of weapons came from the store of Emile Atlan, who had been a gunsmith until the enactment of anti-Semitic laws.

On 27 March 1941, General Picquendar, Chief of Staff of the French Army, issued a decree for the internment of Jewish soldiers from Algeria, especially in the internment camps of Bedeau, Télergma, Chéragas, Djenien Bourezg, Mécheria, and El Meridj. On 2 June 1941, a law required a census of all Jews in Algeria. The phrase "indigenous Israelites" was added to their identity cards. On August 23, 1941, a quota on Jewish students excluded two-thirds of them from study. A decree of 5 November 1941 established a quota of 2% for lawyers and medical professions. Jews were barred from professions such as broker, banker, realtor, forester, midwife, and architect. The economic aryanisation of Jewish property was established by a decree of 21 November 1941.

== November 8, 1942 ==
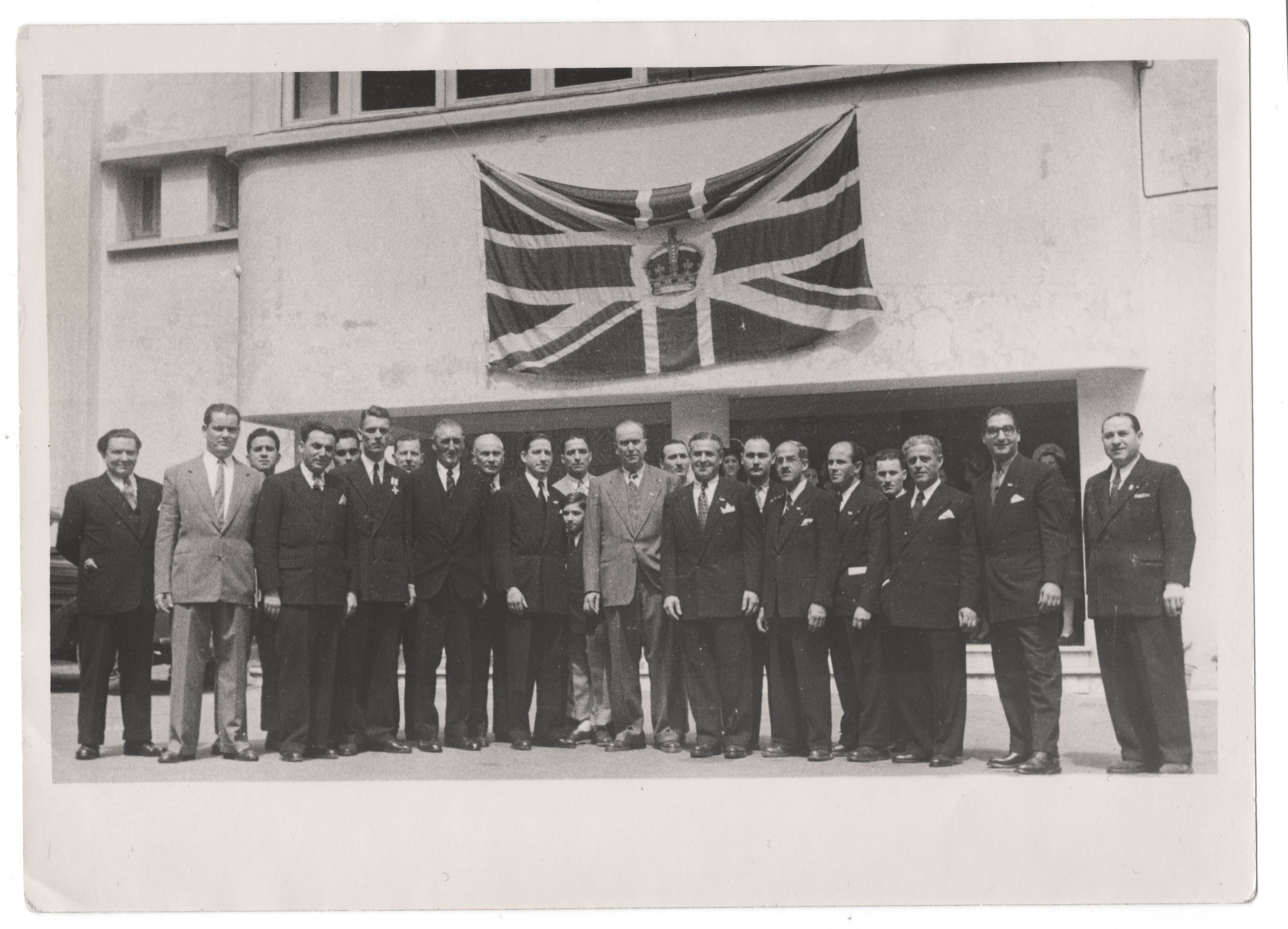
The Géo Gras Group during the King's Medal for Courage in the Cause of Freedom award ceremony

On 22 October 1942, US General Mark W. Clark met secretly in Algeria with the Resistance in advance of the planned Allied invasion. They agreed to two major points:

1. On D-Day, the Resistance shall take control the strategic points of Algiers; cut the Vichy means of communication; neutralize the 19th Army Corps and the police forces until the arrival of Allied forces; and capture Vichy military and civilian leaders.
2. Since the Resistance were out-numbered by the Vichy armed forces, US special forces would be sent in ahead of the main landings, to take over positions captured by the Resistance.

On 7 November 1942, the BBC broadcast the code message "Hello Robert? Franklin’s coming!" ("Robert" refers to Robert Murphy, US Consul General in French North Africa); "Franklin" to US President Franklin D. Roosevelt.) 110,000 troops under the command of General Eisenhower were to come ashore that night. No notice was given to General de Gaulle and Free France.

Colonel Germain Jousse and General Charles Mast led the Resistance operation. Supplies of arms by the Allies had failed, so very old Lebel Model 1886 rifles, stolen from the military by Colonel Jousse, were distributed to resistance fighters. The fighters were identified by "VP" armbands ("Square Volunteers"). These armbands were originally intended to identify collaborationist volunteers.

At 9:00 PM on 7 November, on orders from General Mast or Colonel Jousse, section leaders of the Group led their fighters to key positions of the city. They seized as the barracks of 19th Army Corps, police stations, the arsenal, telephone exchanges, the office of the Governor General (also known as Summer Palace), the Prefecture, and the headquarters of Radio Algiers. All means of communication of the Vichy forces were sabotaged. The operation was accomplished as early as 1:30 AM on 8 November.

However, the Allied invasion was 15 hours behind schedule because of rough seas, communication failure with the Resistance, and the difficulties of the first Anglo-American amphibious operation in the ETO. The positions captured by the Resistance were recaptured by Vichy forces. Resistance fighters tried to hold these positions as long as possible, resulting in the deaths of Lieutenant Jean Dreyfus, and Captain Alfred Pillafort. Allied forces reached the city only in the late afternoon.

== Vichy internment camps and FLN assassinations ==
The action of the members of the Géo Gras Group was a victory of a lightly armed civilian force over the regular army. It was the first major act of the French Resistance during the war. The Group identified itself as belonging to Free France, but had no actual contact with Free French headquarters in Britain.

In the Algiers sector, there was virtually no armed opposition from the French troops to the US invasion, but there was heavy fighting in Oran and in Morocco.

The political situation in North Africa was particularly intricate and unstable after the invasion, with French resistance continuing. In Algiers, the Resistance captured Admiral François Darlan, commander-in-chief of the Vichy French armed forces. Despite his record of collaboration with Nazi Germany, the Allies recognized Darlan as French "High Commissioner in North Africa" in return for his ordering all French troops and officials to cease resisting the Allies and join them in fighting the Axis.

The "Darlan deal" was a shock, but Allied commanders in North Africa justified it on the basis of military expediency. Under Darlan, Algiers went from "Vichy under German control to Vichy under US control". Despite the crucial participation of the Jewish community in the Allied invasion, Darlan refused to reinstate the Crémieux Decree. He continued to declare that he governed "in the name of impeded Marshal Pétain" (even though Pétain had denounced him as a traitor). On 30 November 1942, French General Henri Giraud, who had arrived with the Allies, but then joined with Darlan, ordered the arrest of the civilian leaders of the 8 November action, including Aboulker, Temime, Morali, and Atlan of the Géo Gras Group. In contrast, French soldiers who had fought against the Allies were decorated. When Darlan was assassinated, Giraud succeeded him as commander-in-chief and "high commissioner". In January 1943, the Allies had Marcel Peyrouton made Governor General of Algeria (even though he had been Interior Minister of the Vichy government and had signed the repeal of the Crémieux Decree - the "Peyrouton scandal").

General Giraud repealed the Vichy anti-Jewish laws on 14 March, and closed the internment camps for Jewish soldiers on 28 April, but did not reinstate the Crémieux Decree. In June, Giraud and De Gaulle combined the ex-Vichy regime in North Africa with Free France in the French Committee of National Liberation. But it took five more months to reinstate the Crémieux Decree. On 22 October, French citizenship was restored to Algerian Jews.

On 8 November 1943, the first anniversary of the invasion of North Africa, Giraud decorated the main organizers and French participants in the operation, including d'Astier de la Vigerie and Aboulker, whom he had arrested a few months earlier .

The "Association of the Companions of 8 November" was formed on 21 September 1943. This apolitical association, organized under France's 1901 Association Act, had the aim of "defending the collective interests of the North African Resistance" and "maintaining the spirit of camaraderie and confidence that existed in the Resistance." Some of its leading members were assassinated by Algerian rebels of the FLN in August–September 1956. Fernand Aïch and Emile Atlan were shot at close range in front of their shops. These killings were immediately interpreted as a collective threat to the Jewish community.

== Bibliography ==
Jacques Cantier, L’Algérie sous le régime de Vichy, Odile Jacob, 2002
