= Yves Dechezelles =

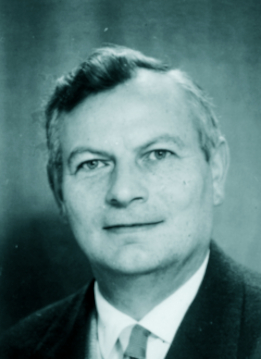
Yves Dechezelles

Yves Dechezelles, born on 11 November 1912 in Sables-d'Olonne (Vendée) and died 9 January 2007, was a French activist and politician.

== Biography ==
Coming from an active leftist family (he was the nephew of the trade unionists Louis Bouët and his wife Gabrielle), Dechezelles committed himself to socialist students in 1928. He took on responsibilities in the Jeunesses socialistes (Young Socialist Movement) of Algeria where he became the federal secretary in 1932.

In 1936, he participated as a delegate of Calvados to the SFIO (French Section of the Workers' International)'s National Council.

However, Dechezelles soon came to be disappointed by Léon Blum's policy, and in particular the refusal to intervene in the Spanish Civil War. He left the SFIO and instead joined the French Communist Party (PCF), in which he very quickly rose to the position of secretary of the Caen division. His time at the PCF, however, was not free from trouble. He was suspected of being a Trotskyite, and found himself to be incompatible with the authoritarian character of the party's leadership. He left PCF in 1938.

== Second World War ==
He then did his military service, and was not demobilized until 1940, the year he moved to Algiers, where his wife was from. There, he joined the bar while participating in the resistance within the Combat network. He was part of group D of Paul Ruff, which later disrupted telephone communications between Algiers and Vichy. He participated with 400 resistance fighters, mostly Jews, in the putsch of November 7 and 8, 1942 in Algiers, which its achievement paved the way for the rapid success in Algiers of Operation Torch, the allied landing in North Africa.

In 1943, Dechezelles participated in the reconstitution of the Socialist Party, then led by Daniel Mayer under the name of "Socialist Action Committee". In June 1943, he was chief of staff for Adrien Tixier, minister in the provisional government. Dechezelles worked with the party Rassemblement démocratique révolutionnaire. He looked into every opportunity for reconciliation, such as the newspaper La Commune, or the Marceau Pivert International Socialist Correspondence.

== 1945 to 1955 ==
In 1944, however, he broke up with Mollet, complaining about the gap between the positions defined by the congress of 1946 and the attitude of parliamentarians and socialist ministers. He resigned from the General Secretariat and presented the Congress of August 1947, a motion so-called "Socialist and Revolutionary Action" (ASR). In December of that year, he left the SFIO to form a separate political party. The ASR, of which Dechezelles is general secretary, however loses influence. She takes part in the Revolutionary Democratic Party, which is without a future.

== 1955 to 1970 ==
At the same time, he continued his professional activities as a lawyer in defense of activists of the national liberation movements, among those being mainly Algerians and Tunisians. He chose to defend Messali Hadj, who was his close friend.

In 1957 the New Left merged with the People's Liberation Movement to create the Union of the Socialist Left, he became a member of the political bureau of the new organization, which itself merged three years later with other parties to create the Unified Socialist Party.

In 1990, he signed the Appeal of 75 against the Gulf War.

Dechezelles died on 9 January 2007, at the age of 94.

== See also ==
- Authority control
- La Bataille socialiste
