= Berthe Bénichou-Aboulker =

French writer (1886–1942)

Berthe-Sultana Bénichou-Aboulker
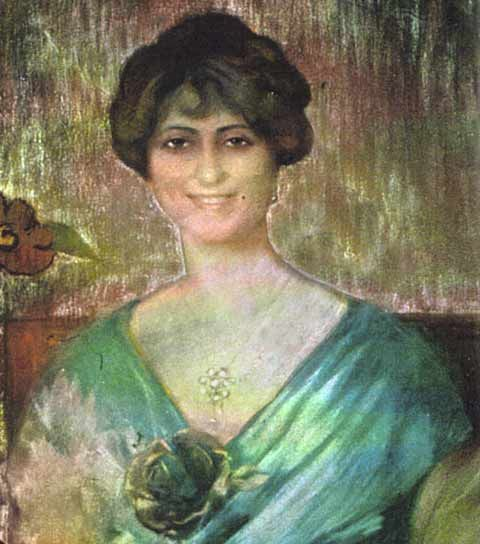
- Early portrait of Bénichou-Aboulker
- Born: 16 May 1888; Oran, Algeria
- Died: 19 August 1942 (aged 54); Algiers, Algeria
- Spouse: Henri Aboulker
- Children: José Aboulker, Colette Aboulker-Muscat, Marcelle Lasry
- Writing career
- Genres: Poetry, Drama
- Notable works: La Kahena, reine berbière

Berthe-Sultana Bénichou-Aboulker (Arabic: بيرت بينيشو أبولكيرl; 16 May 1888 – 19 August 1942) was a Jewish-Algerian poet and playwright who wrote in French. Her play La Kahena, reine berbière (1933) was the "first work published by a Jewish woman in Algeria".

== Life ==
She was the daughter of Adélaïde Azoubib (poet and prose writer) and her second husband, Mardochée Bénichou. She had at least one sibling, a brother, Raymond Benichou. Her husband, Henri Aboulker, was a surgeon and professor; their son, José Aboulker was a surgeon and political figure; and their daughter Colette Béatrice Aboulker-Muscat was a renowned Kabbalah teacher who received the Croix de Guerre for her role in the Algerian Resistance and, in 1995, was awarded the prestigious Yakir Yerushalayim award.

== Bibliography ==
- Assan, Valérie (13 June 2012). Les consistoires israélites d'Algérie au XIXe siècle: "L'alliance de la civilisation et de la religion" (in French). Armand Colin. ISBN 978-2-200-28179-3.
- Sartori, Eva Martin; Cottenet-Hage, Madeleine (1 January 2006). Daughters of Sarah: Anthology of Jewish Women Writing in French. Lynne Rienner Pub. ISBN 978-0-8419-1436-0.
- Yehezkiel, Aliza (2003). The Davidic Families: The Genealogy of Colette Aboulker-Muscat. Aliza Yehezkiel. ISBN 978-965-90295-1-8.
