= Freikorps Sauerland =

- Active: 1944-1945
- Country: Nazi Germany
- Branch: German Army
- Type: Paramilitary
- Role: Militia
- Colors: Green, White

Commanders
- Current commander: Gauleiter Albert Hoffmann

The Freikorps Sauerland (Free Corps of Sauerland), was a paramilitary association created by Gauleiter Albert Hoffmann in September 1944. The name was taken from the nationalist free corps active during the unrest immediately after World War One. In October, the Freikorps was officially established, and accepted by the Party Chancellery of Nazi Germany, where Martin Bormann, head of the Volkssturm associated the Freikorps to his service, as they often completed tasks, missions, etc. with them in the final months of the war. Hoffmann saw the Freikorps Sauerland as an "elite unit" in his Gau Westfalen-Süd campaigns against Allied Forces (notably, this is also where Albert Hoffmann had served as the Gauleiter before war had broken out). Only volunteers were accepted.

The Freikorps fought on the Western Front towards the later half of the Second World War. In April 1945, units of the Freikorps Sauerland fighting in Ruhrkessel (the Ruhr Pocket), suffered somewhat heavy losses from Commonwealth and Allied Forces. The Freikorps Sauerland was among many divisions and armies serving in Westphalia, Olsberg and Altenbüren, where the Brilon Circle of Westphalia was located.

Members of Volkssturm (Freikorps) Sauerland were issued field grey or brown uniforms from the Organisation Todt or RAD (the National Labor Service), and fitted with standard Volkssturm rank insignia. Special insignia were established for the unit, consisting of a white cuff title bearing the inscription “Freikorps Sauerland”, a sleeve patch and a helmet decal. Preserved helmets are usually from the Luftschutz (Air Protection Service) or of the M42 type. Weapons were usually older German and foreign (Czech, Italian, French, etc.) rifles, plus the ubiquitous Panzerfaust and hand grenades.
