= Henri d'Astier de la Vigerie =

French Resistance leader (1897–1952)

Henri d'Astier de La Vigerie (11 September 1897 – 10 October 1952) was a French soldier, Résistance member, and conservative politician.

== Life ==
Henri d'Astier was born in Villedieu-sur-Indre, a small village in the Indre département of central France. His military career began in 1915, and, by the end of World War I, he had reached the rank of lieutenant, and he had been awarded the Legion of Honor.

Politically, d'Astier was strongly conservative and Roman Catholic. In particular, he believed that the republican form of government was inherently weak and ineffective and that France would be stronger under a traditional monarchy. He was an admirer of Charles Maurras, a prominent monarchist intellectual and poet. It is possible that d'Astier was involved in La Cagoule, a fascist-leaning organisation that sought the French Republic's overthrow.

When World War II broke out, d'Astier was called back into active service. Although his political views could be deemed close to fascism, he was also determined to see France stand as a strong nation, and, therefore, he vehemently opposed the German invasion. His reaction contrasted sharply with the attitude of some of his ideological colleagues, who urged collaboration and alliance with the Nazis against a perceived threat from Communism. After the French defeat in June 1940, d'Astier became active in the French Resistance.

He was eventually forced to flee, however, when the capture of a colleague threatened to expose him. He escaped to Oran, Algeria, in 1941. There, d'Astier and the local Resistance infiltrated the Vichy infrastructure in North Africa. The allies invaded North Africa in 1942, and, as the invasion troops were approaching the shore, approximately four hundred members of the French Resistance, under the command of d'Astier and José Aboulker, staged a coup in the city of Algiers. They seized key facilities, including the telephone exchange, the radio station, the governor's house, and the headquarters of the French 19th Corps. They arrested General Alphonse Juin, commander of all Vichy troops in North Africa and Admiral François Darlan, the commander-in-chief of the Vichy military.

Early the next morning, the Vichy gendarmerie arrived and released Juin and Darlan. However, afterwards, Vichy troops lost time retaking the positions seized by the Resistance during the coup, and this allowed the Allied forces to encircle Algiers with little opposition. Breaking with the Vichy régime, Darlan negotiated a surrender with the Allies that allowed him to retain control of the local civil administration.

Despite his surrender, however, Darlan was soon assassinated by Fernand Bonnier de La Chapelle, a member of the Resistance. Although La Chapelle is believed to have acted alone, Darlan's successor, Henri Giraud, accused the Resistance of organising the assassination, and he launched a crackdown. Many of the key figures in the Resistance were arrested, and d'Astier went into hiding. He was found and arrested in early 1943. When Charles de Gaulle became the sole head of the Free French forces, d'Astier was released. Shortly thereafter, he was appointed to De Gaulle's Commission of National Defense.

In 1944, d'Astier led a 45-man detachment in France, operating behind enemy lines to prepare the way for the Allied invasion. He continued to fight in France for the remainder of the war.

Henri d'Astier died in Geneva in 1952.

== See also ==
- Emmanuel d'Astier de la Vigerie
- François d'Astier de la Vigerie
