= First Bayeux speech =

Speech by Charles de Gaulle in 1944

First Bayeux Speech of Charles de Gaulle
- Part of World War II
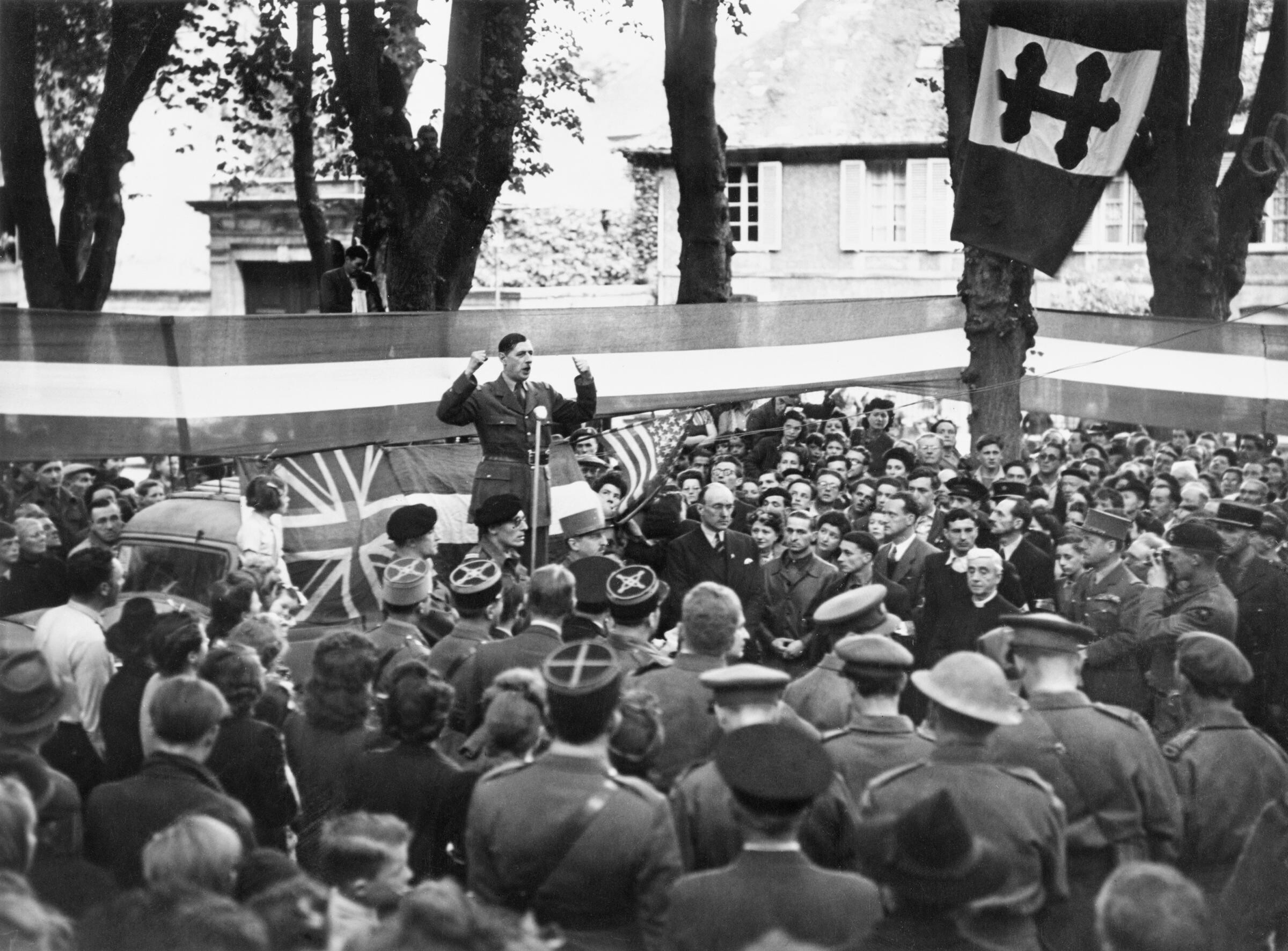
- General de Gaulle addressing the citizens of Bayeux on June 14, 1944
- Native name: Premier discours de Bayeux
- Date: June 14, 1944
- Location: Bayeux, France
- Participants: Charles de Gaulle
- Outcome: Strengthened the legitimacy of the Provisional Government of the French Republic and countered American plans for French administration

The First Bayeux Speech was a speech delivered by General Charles de Gaulle of France in the context of liberation after the Normandy landings in June 1944.

== Background ==
A few days after the Normandy landings, General Charles de Gaulle sought to symbolically meet the French people in one of the first towns liberated. He also aimed to counter the American intentions to establish their own administration in France in the form of the Allied Military Government for Occupied Territories (AMGOT), a branch of which had been specifically prepared to govern France and had started circulating a currency based on the dollar in liberated France.

After D-Day, De Gaulle was anxious to get to French soil. Churchill agreed, allowing De Gaulle to visit Bayeux, with a population of 15,000 the biggest French town liberated so far. This was seen as the first big test of De Gaulle's popularity in France, with the anti-Gaullist President Roosevelt speculating that De Gaulle would "crumble" and the British would be forced to withdraw support.

De Gaulle came to Normandy on the Free French destroyer La Combattante in a delegation that included François Coulet, who had been appointed Commissioner of the Republic for Normandy. The delegation also carried a 250-million franc treasure to counter introduction of the US occupation franc. One of the most famous photographs of De Gaulle was taken aboard during the journey, before he landed between Courseulles and Graye-sur-Mer.

After landing on the coast part of the party went ahead to Bayeux while De Gaulle went to the headquarters of General Montgomery before going to Bayeux and meeting local dignitaries, many of whom had been Petainists.

== Speech ==
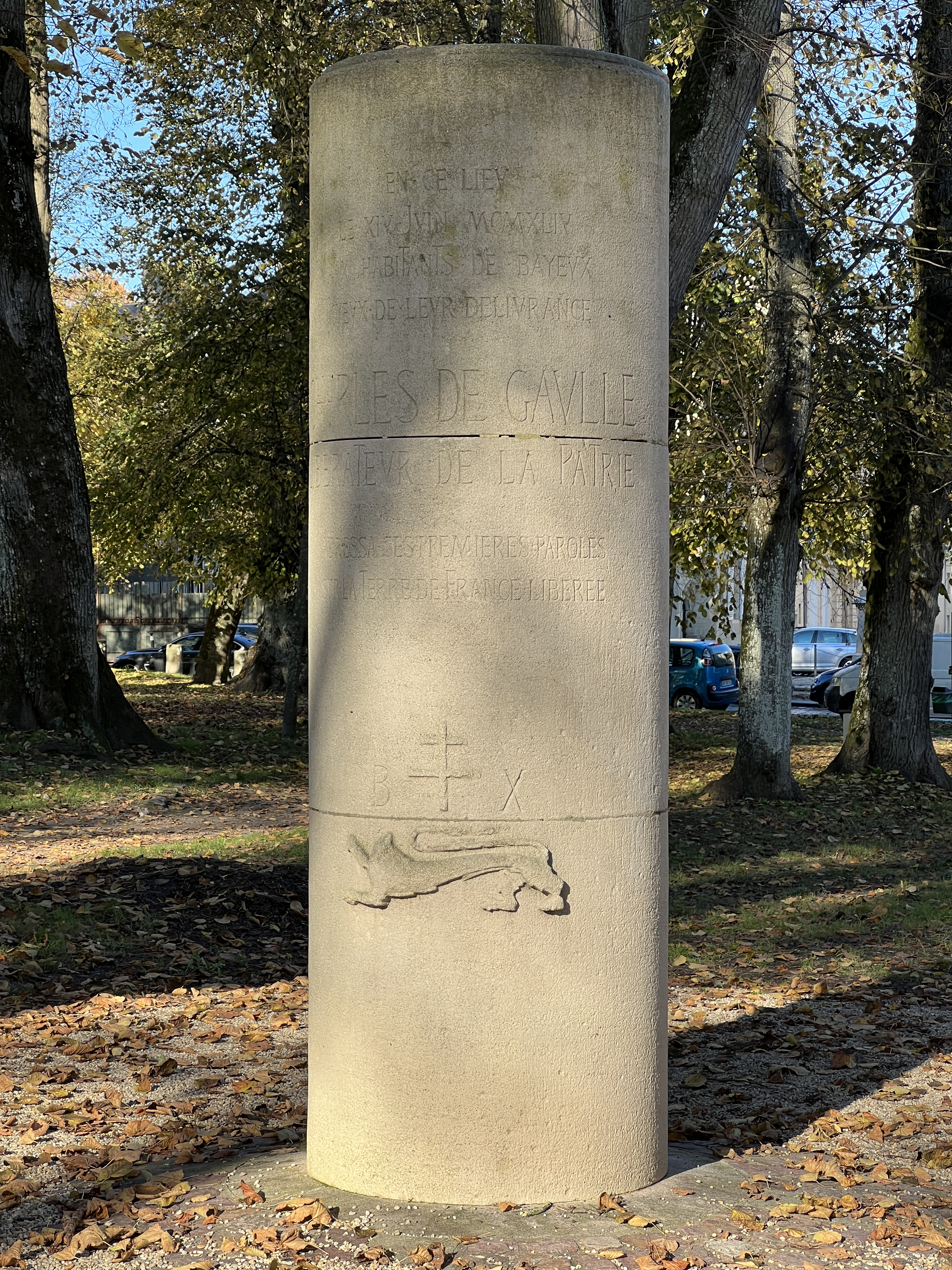
Monument commemorating De Gaulle's visit to Bayeux

De Gaulle was not supposed to have any meetings in Bayeux but he would be allowed to be seen, but De Gaulle decided to make a speech in the town in which he proclaimed Bayeux the capital of Free France. He also appointed his Chef de Cabinet, François Coulet as a Commissioner of the Republic, who through being an efficient administrator who was useful to the allies. This set a precedent for the Provisional Government run by De Gaulle to appoint French administrators loyal to De Gaulle in French territory liberated by the allies.

After the speech, he traveled to the United States for the first time. His visit included meetings with French scientists working on the Manhattan Project as well as Franklin D. Roosevelt.

== Aftermath ==
The enthusiastic reception from the population confirmed his popularity in France, which discouraged the United States from placing France under their administration. The Provisional Government of the French Republic, officially formed on June 3, 1944 in Algiers, the capital of French Algeria, under De Gaulle’s leadership as the successor to the French Committee of National Liberation, was thus able to establish itself in Paris after the liberation of the capital and assume effective leadership of the country.
