= United States military government in France =

Gouvernement militaire de l'armée des États-Unis en France United States Army Military Government in France
- Administrative center: France
- Official languages: English, French
- Type: Military governance organization
- Membership: United States, United Kingdom

Leaders
  - Key Leader: Franklin D. Roosevelt
  - Opposition Leader: Charles de Gaulle
- Establishment: 1944
  - Proposed establishment: 1944
- Joint plan by the United States and United Kingdom for post-liberation governance of France

The United States Army Military Government in France (French: Gouvernement militaire de l'armée des États-Unis en France; English: Allied Military Government of Occupied Territories or AMGOT) was an organization jointly created by the United States and the United Kingdom to administer France after the Liberation. This project was thwarted by the Provisional Government of the French Republic led by Charles de Gaulle.

== Context ==
=== The Italian Precedent ===
The Second World War caused the collapse of several European governments. From the moment they joined the war, the United States initiated plans for military administrations in fallen nations.

AMGOT was deployed at the end of the war in Italy, under the leadership of Harold Alexander.

=== Aborted Plan for the Dismemberment of France ===
President Franklin D. Roosevelt and his administration drafted several plans to reshape European politics after the war. Roosevelt proposed to Anthony Eden the creation of a new state called Wallonia, which involved removing Alsace, Lorraine and parts of Hauts-de-France from France to give them to Belgium. This plan was ultimately abandoned.

=== Plan for Military Occupation ===
A more ambitious plan for a pro-American military government in France was devised. Roosevelt believed that France controlled strategic points in Europe, French Africa, and China, which the United States needed to secure. As Dwight D. Eisenhower noted in Crusade in Europe: "Roosevelt was very pessimistic about whether France would regain its former prestige and power in Europe. Consequently, he was concerned with ensuring control over certain strategic points of the French Empire, which he thought the French might no longer be able to maintain."

In November 1942, Roosevelt had Mark Wayne Clark sign the Clark-Darlan Agreements, which placed French North Africa under American occupation.

In a memorandum dated May 8, 1943, Roosevelt wrote to Winston Churchill: "I am inclined to think that when we get into France, we will have to regard our action as that of a military occupation run by British and American generals... The most important positions, the national administration, must remain in the hands of the British or American commander-in-chief. This will be necessary, I think, for six months or even a year, the time needed to organize elections and a new form of government."

== Preparations ==
Roosevelt proposed an action plan in which British and American generals would rely on French préfets and departments. The United States and the United Kingdom established specialized training schools, such as at Columbia University, to prepare those who would govern the military occupations. Training materials and courses were prepared not only for Germany and Japan but also for France, including its political and administrative structure.

Franc notes were printed by the Federal Reserve. They were distributed beginning with the Normandy landings and were well received by the population. According to Claude Hettier de Boislambert, the American operation aimed to place France under complete dependency: officers would have replaced mayors, municipal budgets would have been managed by the liberators, as well as communication and railway systems. Historian Charles-Louis Foulon, who worked for de Gaulle, asserted that the Americans would have implemented Allied tribunals in France.

== French Opposition ==
=== Operation Torch and French North Africa ===
During Operation Torch in 1942 Allied forces liberated large parts of French North Africa and reached an agreement with the commander of Vichy forces in North Africa, François Darlan giving American forces a large amount of control over liberated French territory in North Africa.

Prior to the agreement, Charles de Gaulle had refrained from directly opposing President Roosevelt. Upon learning of the agreement's contents, de Gaulle sent André Philip to meet Roosevelt in Washington, D.C. on November 20, 1942 to convey Free France's opposition to the new occupation.

Roosevelt revealed his plan for a United States Army Military Government in France following the Liberation of France: "When we enter France, we will exercise the rights of an occupying power... The Americans will remain in France until free elections are organized." Philip retorted, "If the Americans come to occupy the country, their occupation will be no more tolerated than the German occupation." Roosevelt responded, "I will speak to the French people on the radio, and they will do what I want."

=== Creation of the French Provisional Government ===
Charles de Gaulle wrote in his War Memoirs that he was aware of AMGOT’s plans to fully administer the state and embed a lasting American influence, and opposed it accordingly. He was reportedly informed through intelligence provided by Philippe Thyraud de Vosjoli, sourced from French North Africa.

According to Diane de Bellescize, the creation of the Provisional Government of the French Republic was specifically aimed at forming a legally recognized entity to oppose AMGOT. Its creation was driven by a dual objective: preventing anarchy—perceived as benefiting communists—and blocking AMGOT. Thus, before the Normandy landings, President Roosevelt ordered General Eisenhower to avoid any actions suggesting that the administration officially recognized the provisional government as legitimate.

=== The Bayeux Visit ===
There was a belief in the administration, particularly shared by Roosevelt, that de Gaulle was unpopular within France. De Gaulle went to Bayeux on June 14 a little over a week after the landings. Although Bayeux was a small town of 15,000 it was to that point the largest liberated town in France. Here he made a speech that established that he was popular even with the people of Bayeux, who were seen as naturally pro-Vichy and also established François Coulet as the first Commissioner of the Republic representing the Provisional Government in Bayeux and administering the liberated area, setting a pattern that would continue through the liberation.

Michel Debré played a key role in organizing, during June 1944, the replacement of Vichy-appointed préfets with Commissaires de la République, who had legitimacy from the Resistance. This allowed the Resistance to take control and prevented the United States from appointing individuals outside the Resistance.

André Gros, a member of de Gaulle’s cabinet and negotiator with the Americans, wrote that the AMGOT plan was halted by de Gaulle within ten days, between June 4 and June 14, 1944.

=== De Gaulle's opinion on AMGOT France ===
General de Gaulle said concerning AMGOT and the Normandy landings:

The landing of June 6 was the Anglo-Saxon affair, from which France was excluded. They were determined to establish themselves in France as if they were in enemy territory! As they had just done in Italy and as they were preparing to do in Germany! They had prepared their AMGOT, which was to govern France sovereignly as their armies advanced. They had printed their counterfeit money, which would have been legal tender. They would have behaved like conquered countries. This is exactly what would have happened if I had not imposed, yes imposed, my commissioners of the Republic, my prefects, my sub-prefects, my liberation committees! And you would have me go and commemorate their landing, when it was the prelude to a second occupation of the country? No, no, don't count on me! I'm happy for things to go smoothly, but my place is not there !

== Allied Opposition ==
=== British Opposition ===
Broadly, the British obtained assurances from the Americans that AMGOT would not apply to "liberated countries with recognized governments." The United Kingdom had recognized de Gaulle as the leader of France since the Fall of France in July 1940. Americans and British disagreed on whether it was necessary to recognize a legitimate French government under de Gaulle.

The British government at times opposed the project. Anthony Eden, the United Kingdom’s Foreign Secretary, visited Roosevelt in March 1943 and opposed the AMGOT project. He later wrote: "I could not agree with a new American proposal, which was that the Allied forces landing in France should administer the country. It seemed to me that Roosevelt wanted to hold France’s future in his hands to decide the country’s fate. I didn’t like that, and preferred that we work with a French civil authority as soon as possible." In his journal entry of March 4, 1944, Eden noted that the British would be "foolish to follow Roosevelt, blinded by his absurd and petty aversion to de Gaulle."

=== American Opposition ===
The plans to dismember France and then occupy the country also faced opposition in the United States. American media, for instance, were pro-Gaullist and, although unaware of Roosevelt’s plan, regarded de Gaulle as the legitimate leader of France.

Dwight D. Eisenhower opposed the president’s project, unable to comprehend Roosevelt’s animosity and pettiness toward the French general. He influenced Roosevelt in 1944 through telegrams encouraging recognition of de Gaulle as the sole legitimate leader. On June 3, he wrote: "All our intelligence leads us to believe that the only authority resistance groups wish to recognize is that of De Gaulle and his committee... He controls the only military forces capable of participating in the operation. Consequently, from a purely military perspective... we are obliged to deal with him if we want to ensure maximum support from the French, both within and outside the country."

== Legacy ==
As the first President of the Fifth Republic, Charles de Gaulle refused to commemorate the Normandy landings. He also withdrew France from NATO's integrated command structure in 1966 to further assert French independence.
