= Commissioner of the Republic (Provisional Government) =

Commissioners of the Republic
- Commissaires de la République
- Provisional Government of the French Republic (GPRF)
- Style: Equivalent to Minister
- Reports to: Charles de Gaulle
- Seat: Various regional capitals
- Appointer: General de Gaulle
- Inaugural holder: François Coulet (June 14, 1944, in Bayeux)
- Formation: 1944
- Final holder: March 22, 1946
- Abolished: January 1946 (most ceased roles); officially abolished March 22, 1946

Commissioners of the Republic (commissaires de la République) or Regional Commissioners of the Republic (CRR) were tasked with the restoration of republican legality during the Liberation of France from 1944 until March 22, 1946.

Also referred to as Regional Commissaires of the Republic (CRR), they represented General de Gaulle, the leader of the Provisional Government of the French Republic (GPRF). Most of them came from the Free France movement, with some from the French Resistance. They held a rank equivalent to that of a minister (like other commissioners of the GPRF) within the GPRF and reported only to General de Gaulle.

== Purpose ==
Their mission was to restore republican legality and state authority, prevent any power vacuum, and avoid the establishment of an Allied military administration (see AMGOT).

The Commissaires were responsible for reinstating democratic laws, curbing the spontaneous violence of the épurations sauvage (wild purges), and ensuring the lawful purge of administrations, magistrates, and individuals complicit with the Germans. Exceptionally, during this period, the Commissaires were granted the right of pardon, a regal power normally reserved exclusively for the head of state. Their powers were extensive but short-lived, as they were reduced as the central government regained direct control of the administrations. By November 1944, they had already lost control over the judiciary and certain economic matters.

They acted as intermediaries between the Parisian government and local authorities born out of the Resistance (Departmental Committees and local Liberation Committees). If necessary, they had to prevent these committees from overstepping their authority and establishing parallel powers. This risk, however, did not materialize, as the French Communist Party and the Francs-tireurs et partisans remained generally loyal and disciplined, with Maurice Thorez approving the dissolution of the Communist resistance organisations in October 1944.

The CRR also ensured the supply of their regions and the restart of the local economy. In 1945, they oversaw the return of prisoners, political and Jewish deportees, and those conscripted under the Service du travail obligatoire.

== Commissaires ==
The GPRF established 18 regions defined by their capitals. These were based on the regions defined under the Vichy regime, with some changes: the Vichy region was abolished, and two new regions were created for territories previously outside Vichy's control: Lille for the Nord and Pas-de-Calais, and Strasbourg for the Bas-Rhin, Haut-Rhin, and Moselle departments. The regions were rebalanced following the removal of the demarcation line.

A decree on October 3, 1943, appointed 17 CRRs, three special commissaires, and 50 prefects. The CRRs were expected to take their posts before the Liberation, but due to German arrests or errors by the Resistance—who mistakenly executed one CRR and wounded another—there were many reassignments.

A notable case was François Coulet, the first to take office. He was installed in Bayeux by General de Gaulle shortly after D-Day on June 14, 1944, as the CRR for Rouen could not reach his post. Coulet's success in establishing authority over Vichy officials and Allied forces allowed de Gaulle to thwart the last American attempts to implement AMGOT.

Maurice Papon became chief of staff of the commissaire de la République He effectively retained the same functions as during the war. Charles de Gaulle and others "perfectly knew his past," according to Olivier Guichard. De Gaulle had received Papon personally after the liberation of Bordeaux in September 1944.

=== Table of Commissioners ===
In the following list, the CRR in bold was in office at the time of their region's liberation.

Angers	René Brouillet; **Michel Debré** on August 10, 1944; Alain Savary on April 1, 1945.
Bordeaux (departments: 33, 40, 64, 47)	**Gaston Cusin**; Jacques Soustelle in May 1945; Maurice Bourgès-Maunoury in June 1945.
Châlons-sur-Marne	Michel Debré; **Marcel Grégoire-Guiselin** on August 29, 1944.
Clermont-Ferrand	Émile Laffon; **Henri Ingrand**.
Dijon	Professor Reuter; Jean Bouhey in March 1944, but gravely injured by a Resistance group on September 4, 1944, with Jean Mairey taking over temporarily.
Laon	André Ségalat; M. Vivant (arrested); Pierre Pène.
Lille	Francis-Louis Closon.
Limoges	Jean Bouhey; André Fourcade (executed by the Gestapo on August 27, 1944); Pierre Boursicot.
Lyon	Pierre-Henri Teitgen; **Yves Farge**; Henri Longchambon in September 1945.
Montpellier	**Jacques Bounin**
Marseille	**Raymond Aubrac**; Paul Haag in January 1945.
Nancy	Paul Chailley-Bert, who struggled to assert himself but was supported by the Military Delegate Gilbert Grandval.
Orléans	André Mars.
Poitiers (departments: 16, 17, 79, 85, 86)	Four successive CRRs, followed by **Jean Schuhler**.
Rennes (departments: 22, 29, 35, 56)	**Victor Le Gorgeu**.
Rouen	René David, Henri Bourdeau de Fontenay.
St Quentin (departments: Aisne, Ardennes, Oise, Somme)	Pierre Pène, on August 28, 1944.
Strasbourg	Jacques Fonlupt-Espéraber; **Charles Blondel** in September 1944; Émile Bollaert in June 1945.
Toulouse	Édouard Depreux, who was quickly replaced; François Verdier, arrested in December 1943 and executed in January 1944; Jean Cassou, seriously injured in a German ambush on August 20, 1944; **Pierre Bertaux**, who was at the center of rumors (largely exaggerated) about the establishment of a "red republic" in Toulouse, liberated by the FFI under Colonel Serge Ravanel.

== Abolition and aftermath ==
The Commissaires of the Republic were abolished in January 1946 as the return to democratic normality was complete. Some remained in reduced roles until March 22, 1946. Their work was highly esteemed by de Gaulle, and many went on to hold senior positions, such as Secretary of State or Minister.

== Bibliography ==
- Bertaux, Pierre (1973). Libération de Toulouse et de sa région. Hachette Livre.
- Aubrac, Raymond (1996). Où la mémoire s'attarde. Odile Jacob.
- Simonnet, Stéphane (2004) [1994]. Atlas de la Libération de la France (in French). Paris: Autrement. ISBN 2-7467-0495-1.

== See also ==
- High Commissioner
- Commissaire de la République
