= French destroyer La Combattante =

French navy ship

Coordinates: 53.3703°N 1.0278°E

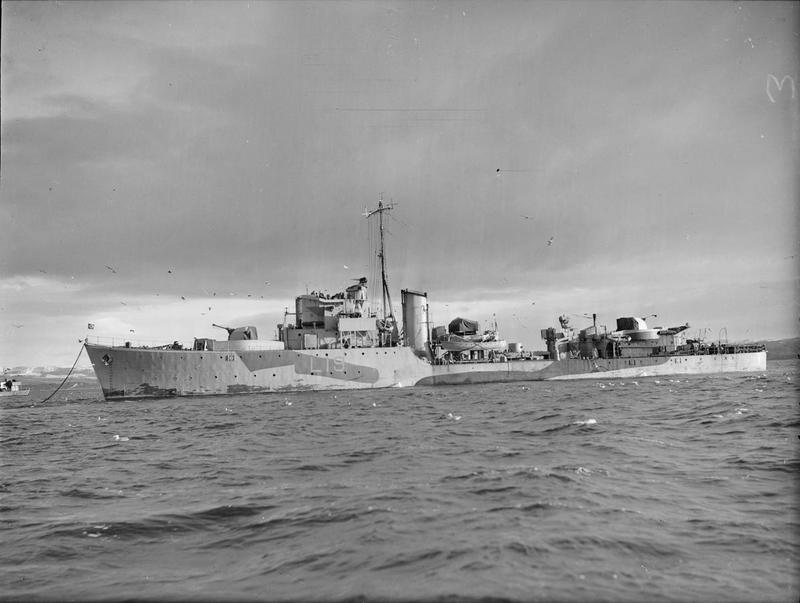
- La Combattante in January 1943

History

United Kingdom
- Name: HMS Haldon
- Builder: Fairfield Shipbuilding and Engineering Company, Glasgow
- Laid down: 16 January 1941
- Launched: 27 April 1942
- Completed: 30 December 1942
- Identification: Pennant number: L19
- Fate: Transferred to Free French Navy in 1942

Free France
- Name: La Combattante
- Acquired: 1 December 1942
- Commissioned: 15 December 1942
- Fate: Mined 23 February 1945

General characteristics
- Class & type: Type III Hunt-class destroyer
- Displacement: 1,050 tons standard; 1,435 tons full load
- Length: 85.3 m (279 ft 10 in)
- Beam: 10.16 m (33 ft 4 in)
- Draught: 3.51 m (11 ft 6 in)
- Propulsion: 2 Admiralty 3-drum boilers, 2 shaft Parsons geared turbines, 19,000 shp (14,000 kW)
- Speed: 27 knots (50 km/h; 31 mph)
- Range: 2,350 nmi (4,350 km) at 20 knots (37 km/h)
- Complement: 168
- Electronic warfare & decoys: Two radars (sea and air sentry); One ASDIC type 144
- Armament: 4 × QF 4 in Mark XVI on twin mounts Mk. XIX; 4 × QF 2-pounder Mk. VIII on quad mount MK.VII; 1 × QF 2-pounder Mk. VIII on single mount; 3 × 20 mm Oerlikons on single mounts P Mk. III; 2 × tubes for 21-inch (533 mm) torpedoes; 110 depth charges, 4 throwers, 2 racks

La Combattante ("The Combatant") was a destroyer (Note: Although classified as a torpilleur ("torpedo ship") in French service, she was effectively an escort destroyer.) of the Free French Naval Forces (Forces navales françaises libres, FNFL). Originally launched as HMS Haldon, a Type III Hunt-class escort destroyer of the Royal Navy, she was transferred to the Free French in December 1942 and renamed *La Combattante* shortly after completion.

Following her launch, she underwent contractor's trials before entering full service with the Free French.

La Combattante* was among the most active Free French warships of the Second World War, providing convoy escort in the English Channel, participating in actions against German naval forces, and supporting the Normandy landings in June 1944.

== History ==
Laid down as HMS Haldon, she was damaged in a German night bombing on 14 March 1941. She was completed, offered to the Free French Naval Forces (FNFL) in December 1942 and renamed.

La Combattante made her first sortie on 23 March 1943, escorting a convoy in the English Channel. She rescued 68 sailors from the Liberty ship Stell Traveller after it struck a naval mine. On 29 May 1943 she picked up British and Australian aircrews; in September 1943 she saved two more British airmen.

During the night of 25–26 April 1944, La Combattante and the frigate HMS Rowley intercepted German E-boats. She sank torpedo‑boat S 147 and damaged another vessel. On the night of 12–13 May she destroyed S 141, killing Klaus Dönitz, Admiral Dönitz's son in the process. During the night of 27–28 May she encountered motor torpedo boats MTB-732 and MTB-739, they mistakenly engaged one another and MTB 732 was lost.

Under commandant André Patou, La Combattante took part in Operation Neptune, providing close fire support off Courseulles-sur-Mer during the Battle of Normandy. She held station 3,000 metres (9,800 ft) off the beach, in 4 metres (13 ft) deep waters, as she shelled shore batteries. She ran aground briefly and HMS Venus sent a morse code message: “I am happy that a French ship be the first to touch the ground of France”. After destroying several batteries she returned to Portsmouth escorting a landing ship dock. On 25 June 1944 she rescued two downed US pilots.

She resumed convoy escorts until 14 July 1944. That day she carried General Charles de Gaulle and senior French officials including Generals Béthouart and Koenig, Admiral d'Argenlieu, Gaston Palewski, Pierre Viénot, Pierre Billotte, François Coulet, Pierre de Chevigné, Geoffroy de Courcel, Pierre Laroque and Claude Hettier de Boislambert onboard via Portsmouth’s King's Stairs.

— Commandant Patou: I assume you wish to go to France, General?
— General de Gaulle: Did you not receive your orders?
— Patou: No General, but it does not matter, we already know the way.
— Admiral d'Argenlieu: Off to Normandy!

They brought a 250-million-franc fund to counter plans for a US occupation franc. A well‑known photograph shows De Gaulle aboard La Combattante just before landing at Courseulles.

On the night of 25–26 August 1944 she sank four German vessels transporting artillery across the Channel.

On 23 February 1945 she struck a mine near East Dudgeon Buoy in the Humber estuary and sank quickly, breaking in two. Of her crew, 118 were rescued by MTBs 76 and 770 and 67, including two British sailors were killed.

A German Kriegsmarine bulletin later claimed she had been sunk on 24 February at 10:28 a.m. by torpedoes from Seehund midget submarine U-5330 under Lt Klaus Sparbrodt near South‑Fall Bank. In fact, U‑5330 had sunk the British cable layer CS Alert.

Expeditions in 2002 and 2005 recovered pieces of her stern in the Humber estuary, confirming mine damage.

== Publications ==
- Colledge, J. J.; Warlow, Ben (2006) [1969]. Ships of the Royal Navy: The Complete Record of All Fighting Ships of the Royal Navy from the 15th Century to the Present (3rd Rev ed.). London: Chatham Publishing. ISBN 978-1-86176-281-8. OCLC 67375475.
- English, John (1987). The Hunts: a history of the design, development and careers of the 86 destroyers of this class built for the Royal and Allied Navies during World War II. England: World Ship Society. ISBN 0-905617-44-4.
