= Claude Hettier de Boislambert =

French Resistance leader

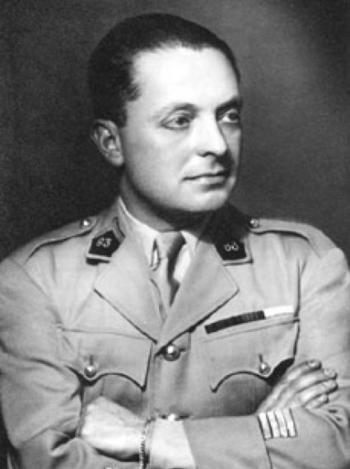
- Hettier de Boislambert c. 1940
- Born: Claude André Charles Antoine Marie Hettier de Boislambert; 26 July 1906; Hérouvillette, Calvados, France
- Died: 22 February 1986 (aged 79); Paris, France
- Occupations: Resistance leader Military governor of Rheinland-Pfalz; Member of Assemblée Nationale (French parliament); Diplomat
- Political party: RPF (Gaulliste); URAS; CNRS
- Spouse(s): 1. Solange de Maleville (1909-2000); (divorced ca. 1940); 2. Odette Duvivier (1906-1971)
- Parent(s): André Claude Auguste Hettier de Boislambert (1872-1926); Henriette Marie Thérèse Joséphine Anne de Bonneval (1881-1968)

Claude Hettier de Boislambert (26 July 1906 - 22 February 1986) came to prominence during the German occupation of France in the 1940s as a Resistance leader, appointed by the Général a Companion of the Liberation in 1943. After the war, with Germany under military occupation, he served between 1946 and 1951 as governor of the region that during his period in office was reconfigured as Rheinland-Pfalz. Subsequently, he became a Gaullist member of parliament ("l'Assemblée Nationale"). From 1960 his contribution to public life was made, principally, as a member of the diplomatic service, notably in Africa.

== Biography ==
=== Provenance and early years ===
Claude André Charles Antoine Marie Hettier de Boislambert was born at Hérouvillette (Calvados) just outside Caen into an upper-middle-class family with long roots in this part of Normandy. He successfully passed his school final exams (Baccalauréat) in 1922. He studied Law and went on to study political sciences at the prestigious Institut d'Études Politiques in Paris. After that, according to one source, he worked as a journalist. Other sources focus on what might be interpreted as a more self-indulgent life-style. By the time he graduated he had inherited sufficient wealth to lead a quasi-aristocratic existence, involving much sport and extensive foreign travel in central Africa where it is reported that he carried out "ethnographic research", in Scandinavia, in central Europe and in the middle-east. His favourite sport was hunting (la chasse). He was also a landowner, and by 1939 was running a well-managed farm-estate at Sainte-Marie-du-Mont (between Caen and Cherbourg).

On 16 January 1928 Claude Hettier de Boislambert, whose father had died two years earlier, married the heiress Solange de Maleville in what was described as "a very elegant ceremony in the Chapel of Beaulieu-Siorac" in the Dordogne region. The bride's beautiful satin dress by the couturier Henriette Boudreau did not go unremarked in news reports.

=== War and resistance ===
==== Before the German invasion ====
The German army launched an invasion of Poland on 1 September 1939. The French and British governments reacted by declaring war on Germany on 3 September 1939, albeit without becoming militarily involved in Poland, even after the Soviet army launched its own invasion of Poland from the other side on 17 September 1939. The French army was more active closer to home, however, and Claude Hettier de Boislambert was called up in September 1939 as part of a generalised mobilisation: he was to serve as a cavalry lieutenant. Immediately he was sent to Lorraine to take part as leader of a horse-back platoon in a reconnaissance group. During the brief invasion of Germany which took place from eastern France in September/October 1939, his reconnaissance group was one of the first to undertake some of the many patrols that the French army high command ordered in the occupied Saarland, notably in the Sierck sector adjacent to the Luxembourg frontier.

==== The invasion ====
After this he became a liaison officer with the British, serving on 1st Division of Cuirassiers which was part of a multi-national combined military operation that also included the British Expeditionary Force, and which had been assembled to defend France's northern frontier against a possible German attack through Belgium (as had happened in 1914 at the start of the First World War). The anticipated German invasion of Belgium and Luxembourg was eventually launched on 10 May 1940. Hettier de Boislambert took part with a tank unit in the fighting around Tienen and Louvain in which French and British forces attempted to resist the German advance towards the English Channel. Then he was ordered to rejoin the main French army which was consolidating a defensive frontline along the Somme. Because of the way the battle lines had moved this now involved crossing enemy lines as the German invasion forces continued their push towards the sea. Hettier de Boislambert rejoined the French army at the Somme frontline on 20 May 1940.

He fought in the 1940 Battle of the Somme (generally identified in English-language sources as the Battle of Abbeville) between 27 May and 4 June 1940, and then in a succession of smaller "delaying actions", first alongside the Seine where the Germans were fighting to capture a series of critical bridges before defenders could blow them up, and then further to the west in Normandy and Brittany. The German invasion of France is nevertheless remembered for the speed with which German forces were able to use their air superiority and pioneer new motorised warfare techniques to capture the northern part of the country. German armies entered Paris on 14 June 1940 and the French government signed an armistice a few days later. By 16 June 1940 Claude Hettier de Boislambert was at the port of Brest. As France fell, he resolved to continue the fight, which meant crossing to Britain, which he did accompanied by those officers and sub-officers who had been fighting under his command who now volunteered to follow him. They travelled on a liner/troop ship that the English had sent to pick up Polish troops who had been fighting in France against the German invasion, having fled the German-Soviet occupation of their own country.

==== De Gaulle ====
On reaching England he learned that Général de Gaulle, whom he had come across during the fighting in northern France, was already on London. On 19 June 1940 Claude Hettier de Boislambert became the first French officer to offer his services to France's self-appointed wartime resistance leader in London. He was invited to participate in the construction of the general's first staff team and join his first "cabinet". Before the war Hettier de Boislambert had come to know Africa well thanks to his regular hunting trips. De Gaulle now teamed him up with resistance commanders René Pleven and Philippe Leclerc for a mission to French Equatorial Africa and Cameroon. They embarked on 6 August 1940. Their objective was to rally the French colonial forces to back Général de Gaulle rather than the Vichy puppet government under Philippe Pétain that was being set up in southern France with German backing. By the end of 1940 French Equatorial Africa had become the strategic centre of Free French activities in Africa, but that was only achieved after several months of fighting against forces backing the Vichy regime. Hettier de Boislambert took command responsibilities successively in Douala and in Cameroon. He took the command at Pointe-Noire under extremely difficult conditions and managed to capture five or seven large cargo ships which now passed to allied control. The success of the mission provided the allies with the means to deliver desperately needed fighter aircraft to the Syria-Lebanon (Proche-Orient) front. He was later made a Compagnon de la Libération as a result of this action.

Hettier de Boislambert was now promoted to the rank of squadron leader ahead of the attempt on 23 September 1940 to capture the strategically important port city of Dakar from the pro-German Vichy French administration of what was then known as French West Africa (modern-day Senegal). The attempt failed, however. Hettier de Boislambert was given charge of the land-based support operation for the Franco-British landing which in the end had to be aborted. After five days at liberty during which he was able to piece back together many of the resistance elements which had been disrupted during the operation, he was himself one of the two resistance leaders captured in the jungle by Pro-Vichy forces on 30 September 1940. There followed long weeks of interrogation in prisons at Dakar and, later, Bamako during which he faced, among others, the Vichy-appointed colonial governor general Pierre Boisson, but sources insist that these sessions left his interlocutors and their Vichy bosses none the wiser about the resistance activities in which he had been engaged.

==== Vichy justice and escape ====
He was then transferred to mainland France where he was imprisoned first at Marseille, then at Clermont-Ferrand and thirdly at Gannat (a small town in the hills between Clermont-Ferrand and Vichy. After approximately nine months of pre-trial detention, it was at Gannat that Claude Hettier de Boislambert faced a court martial on 13 June 1941. The death sentence which the court conferred on him was immediately commuted to "forced labour in perpetuity". Initially he was now taken to another prison, this time in Saint-Etienne, where conditions were particularly harsh. Later he was taken back to the prison at Gannat. At the end of 1942 he managed to escape, probably from a labour gang, which ended a period of detention that by now had extended to approximately 26 months. He spent a couple of months living "underground" (unregistered) in France and was then returned to the presence of The Général in London. The return involved what one source describes as "an aerial operation in the region of Clermont-Ferrand", which was undertaken during the night of 14/15 January 1943.

==== With the general ====
When Hettier de Boislambert was captured in September 1940 many believed that Hitler's Germany would win the war. By the time of his escape from custody, just over two years later, the Nazi-Soviet pact had been upended in June 1941 and the German army had been haemorrhaging men and capability at Stalingrad since the late summer of 1942. On the allied side, the US military had been lining up alongside the British since the Attack on Pearl Harbor at the end of 1941. Hettier de Boislambert's return to de Gaulle's side coincided the start of the Casablanca Conference at which, almost for the first time, western leaders were able to plan seriously for an end to the war on allied terms. Général de Gaulle's attendance was deemed essential by the US and British leaderships, and de Gaulle was determined that if he attended he would do so on his own terms. He arrived accompanied by Claude Hettier de Boislambert whose presence the general evidently thought would be useful. That was quickly followed by a succession of missions to the colonies in Africa.

==== MMLA ====
Promoted by the general to the rank of lieutenant colonel, Hettier de Boislambert was given the delicate but critical mandate to create, organize and command the Mission militaire française de liaison administrative (MMLA, literally, "French military mission for administrative liaison"). The purpose was to establish and harmonise relations between allied forces and liberated civilian populations. It was in reality the core element in support of a larger objective on the part of de Gaulle, to block Anglo-American plans for the establishment of Allied Military Government for Occupied Territories - in other words, the administration of postwar France by British and American military personnel. The head of the MMLA, supported by representatives from not yet created government ministries, had to ensure the security of civilian populations, reorganise health provision in each territorial sector as it was liberated, deal with reanimating hospitals and to prepare to address the housing needs of displaced persons. It had to attend to provision of essential supplies directly following liberation, the installation of civil administration and take the first steps to restore a civilian police force and internal security more generally. Ensuring the viability of basic communications channels was another urgent responsibility.

The massive scope and diversity of the MMLA mission presented formidable challenges, but it was in large part successfully accomplished, despite the difficulties inherent in the wartime conditions and frequent instances of irritation or incomprehension on the part of allied military commanders and officers. The achievements of the MMLA reflected the care and skill of its leader and of the officers whom he had carefully recruited, indoctrinated, trained and brought to operational readiness. As the allied armies fought their way through Normandy, and as each city and town was liberated from German occupation, it would be the MMLA officers or indeed their chief who would be among the first whom the populations would be able to identify. Claude Hettier de Boislambert, personally, was among the first to enter Caen and Saint-Lô. It was therefore not entirely surprising that on 2 August 1944, outside Rennes, he was wounded, as he struggled to be among the first to enter the city so as to be able to release the French men and women who had been imprisoned by the Germans in the city jail.

==== After liberation ====
The Provisional Consultative Assembly was in effect a nominated pre-parliament, launched by the Général from Algiers in September 1943 at a time when France was still under German occupation. It reflected his determination that as the Germans were beaten back there should be no hint of a power vacuum in France that British or US generals might be tempted to fill with some kind of military rule driven from London and Washington. The Provisional Consultative Assembly was expanded between December 1943 and November 1944 as the liberation progressed, notably through the appointment of an additional 16 Resistance representatives from outside metropolitan France ("Représentants de la Résistance extra-métropolitaine"). Hettier de Boislambert was one of these, and he became the group's leader in the assembly. As soon as he was nominated an assembly member he left the MMLA: its work was done. As an influential assembly member he joined its Commission for Colonies and its Finances Commission. The assembly also appointed him Reporter for the Colonies Budget, responsible for presenting to fellow assembly members the budgetary proposals and controls proposed by the government, and for facilitating discussion and where appropriate amendments in respect of colonial budgetary matters. It was another high-level liaison role.

=== Rheinland-Pfalz ===
On 15 November 1945 the de Gaulle government appointed Claude Hettier de Boislambert as Governor of the Rhineland. He took up the appointment with effect from 1 December 1945. The division of the western two thirds of postwar Germany into four military zones of occupation had been agreed between the wartime allies well before the actual end of the war, and the Rhineland represented approximately 50% of the German territory that came under French control in 1945. Hettier de Boislambert had a superficial but usable knowledge of the German language and proven inter-personal diplomatic skills. He was evidently in agreement with de Gaulle's insistence that he should "never forget that without Germany we will not be able to build Europe" ("Und vergessen Sie nicht, daß man Europa ohne Deutschland nicht bauen können wird"). During the allied occupation of Germany the British and American occupation zones would be administered in line with broadly parallel objectives. The French occupation zone was always administered with more than half an eye on the strategic vision of a more co-operative future between European states than had been achieved during the 1920s and ill-starred 1930s. (Differences between the western zones and the Soviet occupation zone quickly became more stark, and subsequently were of greater interest to western commentators and most historians.)

The French occupation zone identified as the Rhineland corresponded to more than one of the pre-1933 states of Germany, some of which during the nineteenth century had been administered from Berlin as Prussian states and one of which had been administered from Munich as a semi-detached corner of Bavaria. In 1946 the entire territory was relaunched as the single German state of Rheinland-Pfalz (Rhineland-Palatinate). The French military governor, Claude Hettier de Boislambert, now became "General Representative" ("Délégué général") of the new state, though in most sources the title of "governor", which he retained, continued to be the title used at least till 1949. It has traditionally been thought that the territorial amalgamations that led to the creation of Rheinland-Pfalz resulted from British and American plans formulated before those countries' leaderships had accepted and thought through the need to include France as one of the powers occupying Germany. There are indications that more recently it has become apparent from re-evaluations of the records that the principal push for the creation of the unified state of Rheinland-Pfalz came from within the French government. There were some who thought this might facilitate a future transfer of the entire territory to France, fulfilling a strategic vision dating back to at least as far back as the time of Napoleon. It was always apparent that neither the Americans nor the British, nor indeed the Germans would accept such a development. There were indeed plenty of influential voices within the French political establishment opposed to the unified Rheinland-Pfalz project. Hettier de Boislambert himself stated that the differing historical traditions of the former Prussian and Bavarian provinces involved were so disparate that he could foresee no prospect that such a territorial amalgamation would endure. Peter Altmeier, who went on to serve for 22 years as Minister President (head of the state government) in Rheinland-Pfalz expressed similar views. Nevertheless, with the Paris government increasingly uniting on the issue, the creation of the unified state of Rheinland-Pfalz went ahead.

On his appointment Hettier de Boislambert took up residence near Koblenz in Schloss Bassenheim: as his "hunting park" he used the "Forstamt Adenau" (now a nature reserve).

He quickly established close contacts with the venerable Bishop Bornewasser of Trier. Within in a couple of months the two of them had agreed denazification measures for those priests identified as being in need. He also teamed up with Bornewasser to promote the credentials of Trier as a university city. (The University of Trier had been closed in 1798, when - as between 1945 and 1951 - the city had been under French military control.) There were rival bids for university investment from Speyer and Mainz, but the bishop and Hettier de Boislambert were able to insist on the superior strategic position of Trier in relation to Cologne, Frankfurt am Main, Koblenz, Luxembourg and the economically (and politically) vital Saarland. In the end Trier lost out to Mainz, although a few decades later, in 1970, the University of Trier would indeed be re-established. In 1948 Hettier de Boislambert delivered the formal Catholics' Day greeting to General Kœnig, the French army commander in the occupation zone. Both men were close political allies of Général de Gaulle, and although he had by this time resigned the French presidency, The General remained a formidable focus of political power. Hettier de Boislambert took the opportunity of the greeting to General Kœnig, which took place in Mainz, to deliver a shamelessly Gaullist speech setting out a vision for a future Europe united in Christian faith.

Germany had abandoned democracy in 1933, and a return to an appropriate form of democracy was a priority in all four of the allied occupation zones. Hettier de Boislambert approved the creation of the Christian Democratic Party (CDP) in Rheinland-Pfalz on 16 January 1946. Almost immediately the CDP was rebranded as the Christian Democratic Union (CDU) which emphasized the importance of avoiding a political system in which the political moderate centre was fragmented into several rival parties. He was also responsible for authorizing the relaunch in his state of what became the Free Democratic Party (FDP) and for the re-establishment of both the Social Democratic Party (SPD) and the Communist Party (KPD). At the end of his life, in reviewing this aspect of his time as governor in an autobiographical piece, Hettier de Boislambert would nevertheless assert provocatively that he himself had never been much of a democrat!

The later 1940s and 1950s were a period of political discontinuity for France, especially following the resignation as chairman of the provisional government of Charles de Gaulle in January 1946. Eleven different men served a prime minister during the presidency of Vincent Auriol between 1947 and 1954. In 1951 the governor of Rheinland-Pfalz was in receipt of a recommendation from the government in Paris that he should take a holiday in order to be able to continue in post over the medium and longer term. Hettier de Boislambert was by now increasingly out of sympathy with the government in Paris. He interpreted the suggestion that he take a holiday as an invitation from the Queuille government to resign. He resigned in April 1951 and stood for election to the Assemblée Nationale (parliament) in the general election that took place three months later.

=== National Assembly membership and the Fourth Republic ===
In June 1951 Claude Hettier de Boislambert stood for election to the national assembly as a representative for the Manche department under the flag of the RPF party. The 1951 parliamentary election was conducted according to a list-based system of proportional representation system. In the Manche department the RPF received 61,249 of the 199,487 votes recorded, which translated into two seats in the assembly. Hettier de Boislambert's name was at the top of the party list for the department, so one of the seats went to him. The RPF had been launched a couple of years earlier as a national political party by Charles de Gaulle in order to campaign for a presidential constitution. De Gaulle observed the political status quo of the 1930s and 1940s and concluded that the parliamentary system, which he characterised as "the regime of the parties" did not permit the operation of a strong and efficient state. In 1951 the RPF won 121 of the 625 seats in the parliament, which was more than the number of seats won by any other individual party. Nevertheless, the other parties were unanimous over rejecting the idea of giving significantly increased political power to any president, so the RPF was excluded from government coalitions during Hettier de Boislambert's time as a parliamentarian. His status as an opposition member of the assembly permitted him a degree of independent action that might have been harder to achieve if he had become a member of a government.

As an assembly member with extensive overseas experience it was not surprising that Hettier de Boislambert became a member of its Foreign Affairs standing commission. From 1954 he was also a member of the standing commission for Overseas Territories (as colonies were now designated). He was accordingly involved in several overseas missions. He was tasked with drawing up the general report of the latter commission, following their enquiry into the application in overseas territories of French social legislation and the French labour code. He was also able to undertake a large number of study visits to Africa on behalf of the national assembly which deepened his already profound knowledge of the continent. It was also consistent with his background and interests that he took a particular interest in the French Union, a structure intended to replace the old French colonial system which was developed during the early 1950s. In 1954 he accepted nomination to join a commission to study questions involving the CECA ("European Coal and Steel Community").

Claude Hettier de Boislambert served as a member of the National Assembly between 1951 and 1956. It would not give a complete picture to indicate that his only concern during this time was with foreign and overseas matters. He submitted numerous motions for resolutions or legislation on domestic business. On 27 June 1952 he proposed a law to create a "national hunting permit" ("permis national de chasse") to replace the patchwork of administrative and regulatory structures governing hunting in different parts of France. On 22 July 1953 he proposed a resolution inviting the government to enforce the implementation of an old-age pension system for the self-employed. He also intervened in support of victims of the coastal floods that breached the dykes of the Bay of Veys in his home department during the spring of 1954.

It was presumably out of personal regard for a former Free France comrade that Hettier de Boislambert merely abstained in the investiture vote for Prime Minister René Pleven on 24 July 1951. He was nevertheless open in his hostility to attempts to govern with a so-called Third Force coalition government, voting against the composition of the government on 11 August 1951. The next month he backed what became known as the "Marie and Barangé laws", which provided for financial support for children educated in private schools and was bitterly opposed by left wingers and by secularists. (Most of the private schools affected were church schools.) On 13 December 1952 he voted against parliamentary endorsement of the treaty which confirmed French membership of the CECA ("European Coal and Steel Community"). As the RPF party began to break apart under the pressure of its own internal contradictions, Hettier de Boislambert did not join the 27 party members in the assembly who voted on 6 March 1952 to support the appointment as Prime Minister of Antoine Pinay. He chose to abstain in the vote to approve the composition of the Pinay government. Shortly after this Charles de Gaulle, who continued to direct the RPF from his lofty position above and beyond the political fray from his home in Colombey-les-Deux-Églises, effectively released the party's members in the assembly from their residual bonds of party loyalty and Hettier de Boislambert threw in his lot with the short-lived URAS party which was in some respects a successor to the RPF. As the URAS dissolved he joined the Social Republicans (CNRS). The fact that he was a member successively of three parties during his time as a member of the Assemblée Nationale masks an essential continuity in Hettier de Boislambert's six year parliamentary career, since each of the three parties was, in is different way, the de facto Gaulliste party of the moment, albeit operating within a parliamentary constitutional structure which the Gaullistes repudiated. On 6 January 1953 Hettier de Boislambert voted in support of the appointment as Prime Minister of René Mayer, and on 27 May 1953 he took part in the investiture debate for Paul Reynaud. He never concealed the fact that his voting actions were driven by his continuing and absolute backing for constitutional reform, and on this point he had been encouraged by undertakings that Reynaud was understood to have provided. However, Reynaud was a committed proponent of European Union, and his advocacy of a European army quickly irritated Hettier de Boislambert. He insisted that Reynaud's presentation of a choice between a European army and a German army offered a false dilemma. Drawing on his experiences as Governor of Rheinland-Pfalz he pointed out that the West German "without us" reaction to the idea of a European army was not a cry of cowardice but a cry of prudence. In respect of the treaty establishing the European Defence Community, Hettier de Boislambert called for certain additional safeguards: to be sure, "stability and government continuity [were] indispensable", but it could not be possible to impose them at too high a price. He decided to abstain in the vote following the debate. He also abstained on 4 June 1953 in the vote to back the prime ministerial appointment of Pierre Mendès France. By way of contrast, he voted in support of Joseph Laniel's appointment, but the deteriorating situation in Indochina later led him to withdraw his support from the Laniel government.

On 6 May 1954 and again on 13 May, Claude Hettier de Boislambert effectively challenged the government over its Indochina policy. He stressed the interconnectedness of question involving the European Defence Community (CED) and Indochina. He said, "The problems we face are even more serious than the barbed wire of Điện Biên Phủ. Because it is our presence in Asia, the structure and cohesion of the entire French Union, which is challenged". He refused to express confidence in the government. "As we think with anguish about our wounded, about the ones who are fighting, about the hardships they undergo, many of us will answer 'no' when asked to express confidence [in the government]". He added, "It is the glory of our military that allows for an honorable negotiation which cannot in any way ... be seen as a capitulation". The next day the fighting stopped at Điện Biên Phủ. On 13 May Hettier de Boislambert again refused, "on behalf of his friends", to accord confidence to the government. On 25 May 1954 he was appointed by the Commission for Overseas Territories to membership of the coordinating committee for examining the country's problems associated with Indochina. Then on 12 June 1954 he again refused to give his confidence to the government, and was thereby instrumental in its collapse. Accordingly, he backed the installation of Pierre Mendès France as prime minister, backing his investiture and his Indochina policy. He supported Général Aumeran in the vote of 30 August 1954 which effectively rejected, without a debate, the European Defence Community in the wake of the Accord of Paris. On 4 February 1955 he again backed the government over its policy in North Africa (though the government nevertheless lost the vote).

On 26 October 1955 Claude Hettier de Boislambert participated in the discussion of arrests and more generally the policy of the Edgar Faure government. He described himself as "a convinced supporter of the need for governmental stability and a just distribution of powers and responsibilities". He denounced afresh the governmental instability and criticized the policy of a cabinet which led France to retreat and isolation, evidenced by the disappointing 1955 Saar referendum results in which more than two thirds of participating voters had backed union with West Germany in preference to remaining in economic union with France. As for the deteriorating conditions in North Africa, the situation called for a policy of firmness in place of the dithering which, till that point, had been the government reaction. Finally the member from Manche again shared his doubts on the French government's Indochina policy. He gave vent to his mistrust of the Vietnamese political leader, Ngo Dinh Diem and denounced the election rigging: "The referendum was held in conditions that would be comical if the situation were not so serious". He suggested that the United States were calling the shots with the Vietnamese at a time when there should be a pulling together to confront the main danger presented by the communism in the north of the territory. He maintained that everything being done by the French government in Indochina was only encouraging communism, "the main beneficiary from your government's attitudes", as he accused Prime Minister Edgar Faure on 2 January 1956. That was the date of the 1956 general election, held six months ahead of schedule after the government had lost a confidence vote. From the Manche department Claude Hettier de Boislambert as not re-elected.

=== Diplomacy and the Order if the Liberation ===
The 1958 general election represented a popular endorsement, by a sufficient albeit far from overwhelming majority, for a return to national leadership by Charles de Gaulle and for the new constitution which gave the president very significantly increased executive powers. Claude Hettier de Boislambert had been a regular traveller to Africa since the 1920s and had acquired a profound knowledge of the continent. On 14 June 1960 the Général appointed him Ambassador and High Representative to the newly reconfigured Mali Federation. After its dissolution he served French ambassador to Dakar (Senegal) till 1962.

On 22 August 1962 the Général appointed Claude Hettier de Boislambert to the position of Grand Chancellor of the [highly prestigious] Order of Liberation. His mandate would be renewed four times. The only higher rank in the order was that of Grand Master, which was held by Charles de Gaulle himself. After the general died in November 1970 the council of the order determined that there could be no successor Grand Master. The Grand Chancellor remained in post till 1978, however. He did not view the role simply as a sinecure. He oversaw a restoration of the Hôtel des Invalides and the Robert de Cotte Pavilion in which he installed, in 1967, the Chancellry of the Order of Liberation. In 1970 he and his wife Odette created the Musée de l'Ordre de la Libération at Les Invalides.

He caused particular consternation among members of the Gaulliste old-guard at the time of the 1974 presidential election when he gave his support not to the Gaulliste candidate, Jacques Chaban-Delmas (who came a very distant third) but to the intellectually assertive young upstart Independent Republican candidate, Valéry Giscard d'Estaing (who - very narrowly - won).

Claude Hettier de Boislambert died in Paris in 1986. His body was buried at Sallenelles Calvados.
