= Franchise stamp =

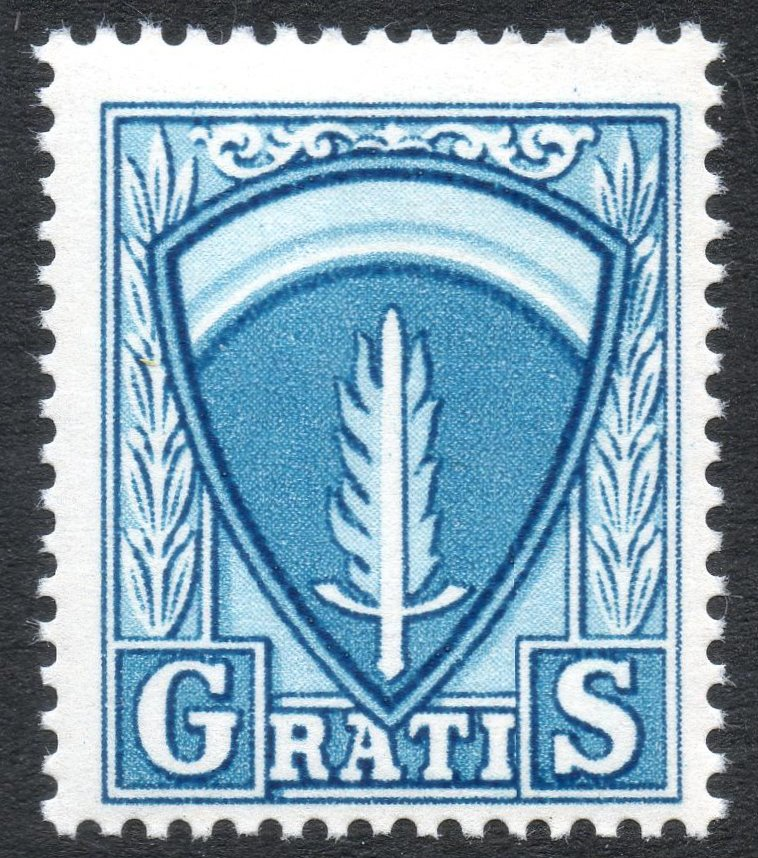
A franchise stamp issued by the Allied Military Government in 1948 to exempt travellers from fees when crossing borders

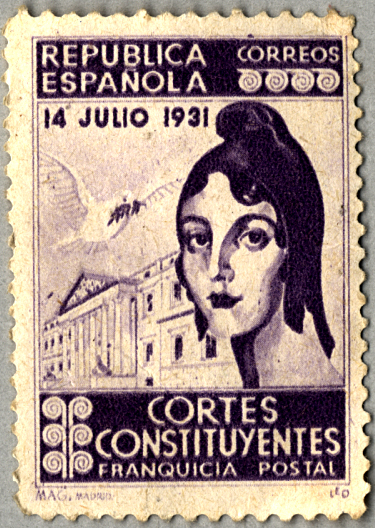
Franchise stamp of the Constituent Cortes of the Second Spanish Republic

In philately a franchise stamp or frank stamp is a stamp given to an individual or organisation to enable them to send mail without charge. Typical recipients include charities, refugees and soldiers on active service (military franchise stamps).

France overprinted a 90c stamp with an olive branch design for refugees from the Spanish Civil War (Scott No. S1) and Brazil issued a franchise stamp between 1865 and 1870 for use by soldiers during the war with Paraguay. In Portugal franchise stamps were issued to members of the military commission in charge of prisoners of war and to a number of other organisations, including the Red Cross Society, civilian rifle clubs and the Geographical Society of Lisbon.

Franchise stamps have also been issued by Switzerland and Spain.

In 1948, franchise stamps were issued by the Allied Military Government to permit exemption from the travel permit fee when crossing borders.
