= Francis-Louis Closon =

French official and Resistance member

- Born: 18 June 1910; Marseille, France
- Died: 12 December 1998 (aged 88); Paris 8th, France
- Occupation: Director of insee
- Known for: French Resistance member, high-ranking French official

Francis-Louis Closon (also known by the aliases Vincent, Cou, Coulanges, Derdon, Fouché, Paraffine; 18 June 1910 – 12 December 1998) was a French Resistance member, a Companion of the Liberation, and a senior French official.

== Biography ==
A student at Lycée Thiers in Marseille (Saint-Charles annex), and later a law graduate, Closon was involved in Christian-democratic movements during his youth. In 1938 he completed an internship in the United States, where he learned of France's defeat in 1940. He joined the Gaullists in London and became heavily involved in the French Resistance. He helped to bring together the internal and external resistance movements. In July 1944 he was appointed Commissaire de la République for Nord and Pas-de-Calais, while Raymond Aubrac was assigned to Marseille.

He was sent on a mission in early August with Charles Luizet, newly appointed Prefect of Police in Paris, and Lazare Rachline. They were to be dropped into a resistance area near Ambérieu, but the plane was unable to land, forcing them to land in Corsica.

On their third attempt, Luizet and Closon were dropped in a resistance area near Apt in the Vaucluse on 10 August. From there they traveled to Avignon, Lyon, and finally Paris on {17 August. By late August, Closon arrived in Lille and held his post as regional Commissioner of the Republic until 1946.

Afterward, Closon became the director of the National Institute of Statistics and Economic Studies, which replaced the National Statistics Service set up by the Vichy government. He served as director from 1946 to 1961.

== Honors ==
- Legion of Honour
- Order of Liberation
- Ordre national du Mérite
- Croix de Guerre
- Order of Agricultural Merit
- Order of the Black Star
- Order of the British Empire
