= François Coulet =

- Born: François Coulet; January 16, 1906; Montpellier, France
- Died: June 11, 1984 (aged 78); Paris, France
- Education: University of Montpellier (Bachelor's); École normale supérieure (Literature, disputed); École libre des sciences politiques (Law degree)
- Occupations: Diplomat, military officer
- Years active: 1936–1960s
- Known for: Free France member, Commissioner of the Republic in Normandy, creator of air commandos in the Algerian War
- Notable work: Vertu des temps difficiles (1966)
- Awards: Chevalier of the Legion of Honour; Médaille de la Résistance with rosette; First Class of the Order of Homayoun (Iran)

François Coulet (January 16, 1906 – June 11, 1984) was a diplomat who joined Charles de Gaulle and the Free France movement in June 1940. He served as Commissioner of the Republic in Bayeux in June 1944 and was involved in establishing the air commandos during the Algerian War.

== Early life and education ==
François Coulet was born into a wealthy Protestant family. His father was the rector of the academy in Montpellier. Coulet initially aspired to attend the École spéciale militaire de Saint-Cyr, but his father, a supporter of the Radical Socialist Party, discouraged him.

Sources vary on his education: some state that he attended the École normale supérieure in Paris to study literature, while others suggest he obtained a bachelor's degree at the University of Montpellier. He also earned a law degree and attended the École libre des sciences politiques. He passed the foreign affairs ministry exam in 1936.

== Career ==
=== Early diplomatic work ===
At the start of World War II, Coulet was stationed in Helsinki. Following the rise of Philippe Pétain on June 16, 1940, he decided to join the Free France forces. He left Helsinki on June 19, 1940, with his wife and two companions, embarking on a journey that took them through Tallinn, Moscow, Kiev, Sofia, and Istanbul. He eventually reached Port Said, Egypt, and joined the 1st Colonial Infantry Battalion. General Charles de Gaulle entrusted him with key missions, including liaising with Félix Éboué in Fort-Lamy.

In Jerusalem, on April 27, 1941, Coulet met De Gaulle and became his aide-de-camp, succeeding Geoffroy Chodron de Courcel. Based mainly in London, he served until October 1942, after which he returned to active combat.

=== Military service ===
With the rank of captain, Coulet commanded the French Air Infantry in Camberley, England. In October 1942, he trained with the Polish 1st Parachute Brigade and obtained his parachutist brevet at Ringway near Manchester.

In June 1943, he was appointed secretary-general of police in Corsica, assisting in the transition from Vichy France to Free French administration. Afterward, in June 1944, he was parachuted into Normandy to manage the transition in liberated territories. On June 12, 1944, he was named Commissioner of the Republic for Normandy. Two days later, he welcomed De Gaulle to Bayeux during his first visit to liberated France. Coulet successfully worked to counter the Allied Military Government for Occupied Territories (AMGOT) plan for a US Army run government in France, securing autonomy for the French administration.

=== Post-war diplomacy ===
After the war, Coulet rejoined the diplomatic corps. He served as director of the European Bureau at the Quai d'Orsay and held ambassadorial roles in Helsinki (1947–1950), Tehran (1950–1954), and Yugoslavia (1954–1955).

=== Algerian War and air commandos ===
In 1956, Coulet left diplomacy to participate in the Algerian War. As a reserve officer in the French Air Force, he took command of the newly created air commandos. By July 1957, he led the 541st Air Commando Group. During his tenure, he emphasized rigorous training and esprit de corps. In March 1960, he transitioned to a more administrative role as director of political affairs in Algeria. Despite his loyalty to De Gaulle, Coulet faced challenges, including the dissolution of his command unit after the Algiers putsch of 1961.

== Decorations ==
- Chevalier of the Legion of Honour
- Médaille de la Résistance with rosette (July 3, 1946 decree)
- First Class of the Order of Homayoun (Iran), November 24, 1954

== Bibliography ==
- François Coulet, Vertu des temps difficiles, Paris, Plon, 1966.
- Henri Féraud, Les Commandos de l’Air, Nouvelles éditions latines, 1986.
