= Clark-Darlan Accords =

1942 political agreement between the U.S. and François Darlan

Accords Clark-Darlan
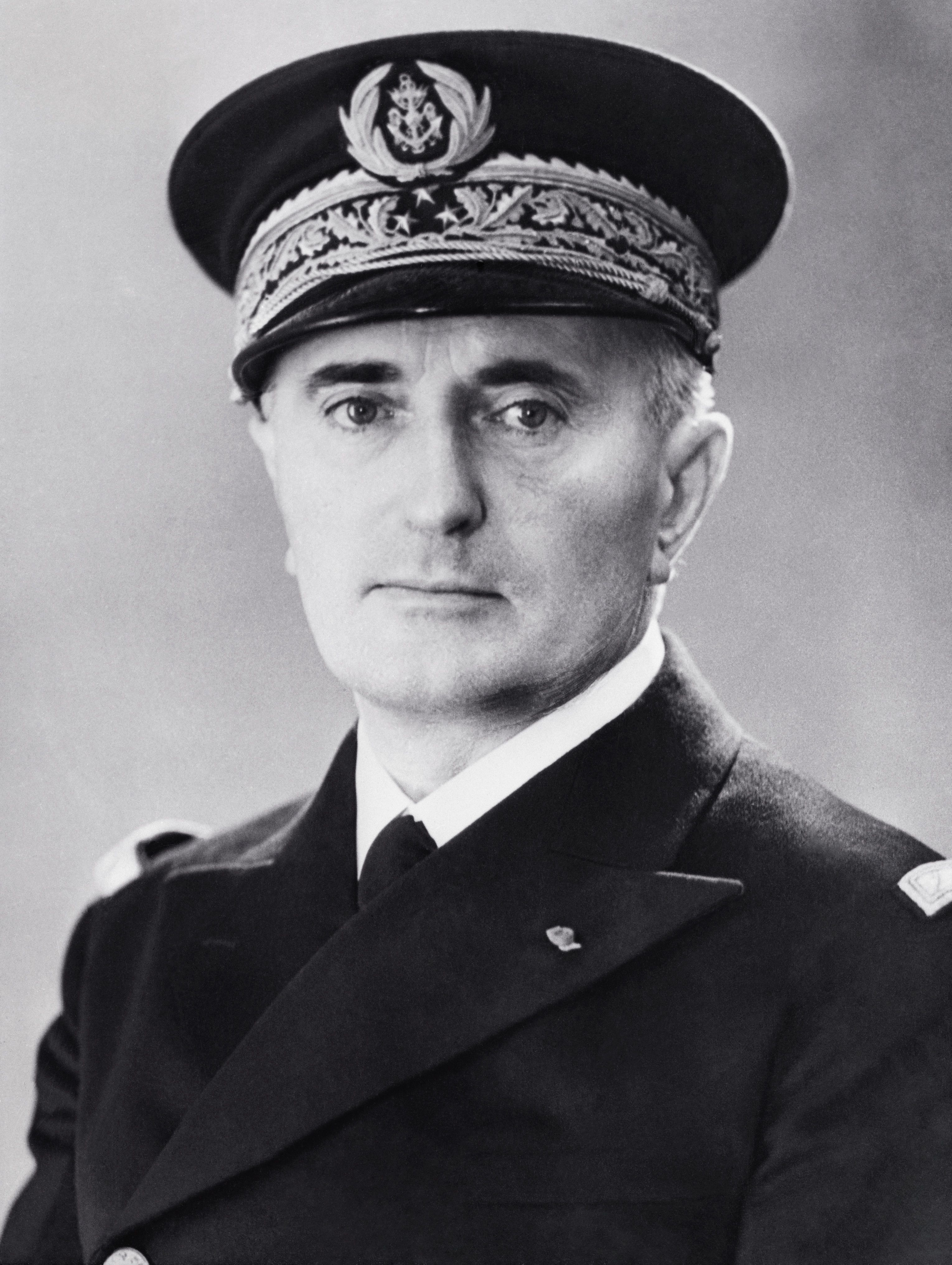
- François Darlan, a key signatory of the agreement
- Type: Political agreement
- Signed: November 22, 1942
- Location: French North Africa
- Signatories: Mark Wayne Clark, François Darlan
- Parties: United States, Vichy forces in French North Africa

The Clark-Darlan Accords (Accords Clark-Darlan) was a political agreement signed between the United States and François Darlan on November 22, 1942, to outline the terms of cooperation between the United States and Darlan's forces in the French Colonial Empire. These agreements granted significant control over the French colonial empire in Africa to the United States. Charles de Gaulle opposed the agreements, viewing them as an infringement on French sovereignty.

== Background ==
On November 10, 1942, François Darlan issued a ceasefire order and declared that he would exercise authority in French North Africa on behalf of Philippe Pétain, whom he described as "prevented" from governing. Though repeatedly condemned by the Vichy regime, Darlan continued to claim he governed on Pétain's behalf, asserting that the Marshal was "morally imprisoned."

The United States regarded French Africa as a strategic region in the fight against the Third Reich. They also sought to enhance their strategic influence within the French Colonial Empire, with President Franklin Delano Roosevelt believing that post-liberation France would be unable to govern its empire, requiring American intervention.

On November 13, 1942, Henri Giraud met with Mark Wayne Clark, in the presence of President Roosevelt's personal representative to North Africa Robert Murphy. General Clark, initially prepared to recognize Giraud as commander-in-chief, also received Charles Noguès, who argued that North Africa remained loyal to Pétain, who was revered by both French settlers and indigenous populations. Under the influence of Marshal Alphonse Juin, Noguès eventually agreed to Giraud's inclusion in the arrangement.

== Negotiations ==
The goal of the negotiations between Giraud, Darlan, Clark, and Murphy was to create a stable framework for cooperation between Vichy France and the United States. Marshal Juin and Charles Noguès reached the following compromise: Charles de Gaulle would not come to North Africa, and Giraud would serve under Darlan's authority, acting on behalf of Pétain.

On the evening of November 13, 1942, Noguès declared via radio that he was transferring his powers to Darlan "on behalf of the Marshal and with his agreement." Darlan, in turn, announced to the population that the Americans would assist the French in defending North Africa, stating: "Frenchmen and Muslims, I count on your full discipline. Each to his post. Long live the Marshal, long live France!"

On November 22, 1942, the negotiations concluded with an American-approved text defining the contours of the new governance arrangement. The stated objective of the agreements was to "drive the common enemy from African soil."

== Content ==
The agreement's preamble recognized Darlan's French forces as full allies of the United States and the United Kingdom, affirming the integrity of the French Colonial Empire.

The first two articles governed military cooperation: French forces, under French command, maintained order in the territories and collaborated with Allied forces. French warships were resupplied with fuel by the Americans.

Article 3 stipulated that "French government personnel shall remain in place." The Americans accepted the continuation of personnel, institutions, and laws from the Vichy regime. Free France was entirely excluded.

The agreements also specified the release of individuals detained for assisting the Allied landings (Article 11) and fixed the exchange rate of the dollar at 75 FRF instead of the previous 43.80 FRF established by the Cherchell Conference.

In return for recognizing the Vichy regime, the United States secured numerous rights resembling occupation privileges:

- The right to move French troops
- Control over ports, airfields, fortifications, arsenals, telecommunications, and the merchant navy
- Authority to requisition French property
- Tax exemptions
- Extraterritorial rights under American law
- Administration of military zones designated by the Americans
- Some activities, such as law enforcement, administration, economy, and censorship, were entrusted to "joint commissions."

== Consequences ==
=== Occupation of the French Empire ===
The Clark-Darlan Agreements enabled the United States to occupy the French Colonial Empire. Historians Annie Lacroix-Riz and Jean-Baptiste Duroselle noted that the Americans' demands were "exorbitant." Through Darlan, France granted "extraordinary privileges akin to capitulations" to the United States.

=== Tensions Between De Gaulle and Roosevelt ===
Prior to the agreement, Charles de Gaulle had refrained from directly opposing President Roosevelt. Upon learning of the agreement's contents, de Gaulle sent André Philip to meet Roosevelt in Washington, D.C. on November 20, 1942 to convey Free France's opposition to the new occupation.

Roosevelt revealed his plan for a United States Army Military Government in France following the Liberation of France: "When we enter France, we will exercise the rights of an occupying power... The Americans will remain in France until free elections are organized." Philip retorted, "If the Americans come to occupy the country, their occupation will be no more tolerated than the German occupation." Roosevelt responded, "I will speak to the French people on the radio, and they will do what I want."

=== Reactions ===
Douglas MacArthur criticized the agreement and Roosevelt's treatment of Charles de Gaulle. He told Admiral Thierry d'Argenlieu in April 1943: "As an American and as a soldier, I am ashamed of how my country treats General de Gaulle. The shame my government brought upon itself in the sad affair of North Africa will take a long time to erase."
