= French Committee of National Liberation =

Provisional government of Free France

- Resistance government in exile of liberated French colonial territories

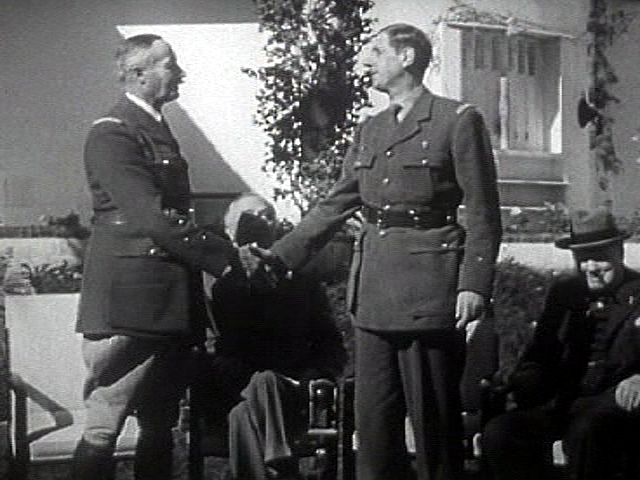
- Henri Giraud and Charles de Gaulle shaking hands during a meeting.
- Date formed: 3 June 1943
- Date dissolved: 3 June 1944

People and organisations
- Chairman: Charles de Gaulle
- Co-Chairman: Henri Giraud

History
- Predecessor: French National Committee
- Successor: Provisional Government of the French Republic

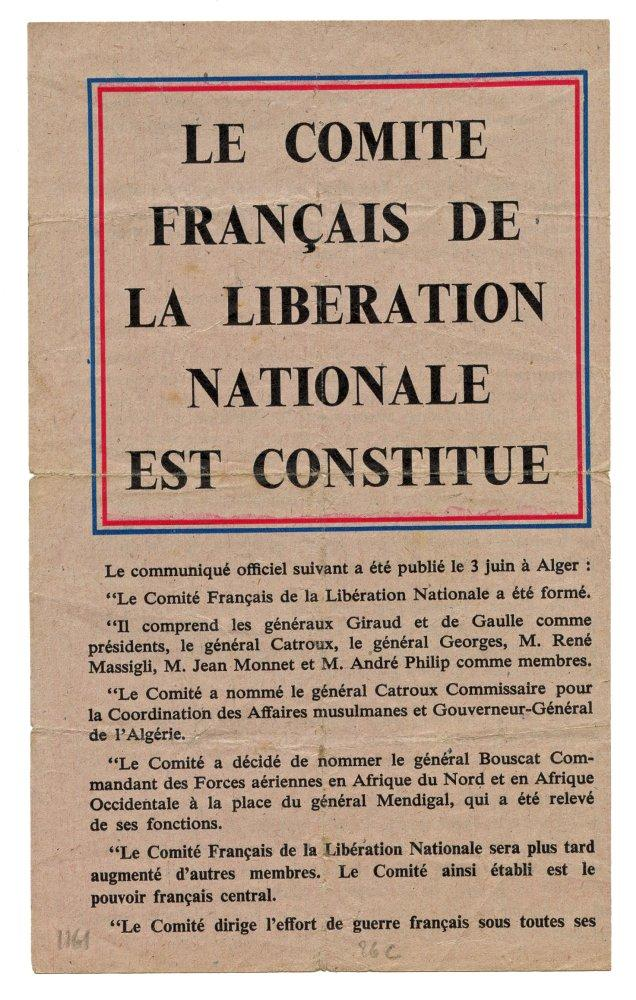
Poster announcing the founding of the French Committee of National Liberation.

The French Committee of National Liberation (French: Comité français de Libération nationale [kɔmite fʁɑ̃sɛ d(ə) libeʁɑsjɔ̃ nɑsjɔnal]) was a provisional government of Free France formed by the French generals Henri Giraud and Charles de Gaulle to provide united leadership, organize and coordinate the campaign to liberate France from Nazi Germany during World War II. The committee was formed on 3 June 1943 and after a period of joint leadership, on 9 November it came under the chairmanship of de Gaulle. The committee directly challenged the legitimacy of the Vichy regime and unified all the French forces that fought against the Nazis and collaborators. The committee functioned as a provisional government for Algeria (then a part of metropolitan France) and the liberated parts of the colonial empire. Later it evolved into the Provisional Government of the French Republic, under the premiership of Charles de Gaulle.

== Background ==
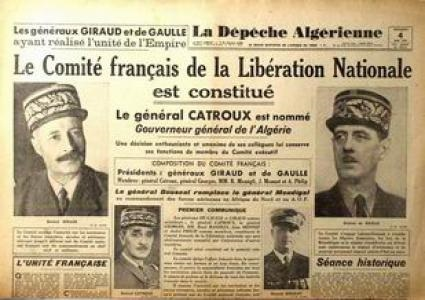
First page of La Dépêche algérienne headlining the creation of the French Committee of National Liberation 4 June 1943

After the defeat of France in 1940, Marshal Philippe Pétain assumed complete power and signed an armistice with Nazi Germany with Fascist Italy. Pétain set up the Vichy regime, which governed unoccupied southern and central France. Vichy also controlled French overseas territories, with the exception of a few colonies which declared support for Free France and de Gaulle. Vichy France was officially neutral in the war, though regarded as a German puppet, but German forces did not enter Vichy territory.

Free France became a government in exile, supported by Britain, rallying several thousand troops and gaining control of additional French colonies occupied by the Allies. But Free France was not officially recognized by the United States or even Britain.

In November 1942, the Allies invaded French North Africa. Vichy forces there resisted the Allies until ordered to join them by Vichyite Admiral François Darlan, whom the Allies recognized as ruler of French North Africa and other Vichy-loyal colonies. The Allies had brought General Giraud to North Africa, hoping that his high rank and heroic record would get Vichyites to join the Allies, but had no success. However, Darlan named Giraud commander-in-chief of French army forces. Free France had not been informed of the invasion and the subsequent "Darlan deal" were made without their consent.

Vichyite officials in North Africa remained in authority, under Darlan until he was assassinated in December, and then under Giraud. De Gaulle in London furiously lobbied for Free French control. Giraud had no interest in politics, but he wanted to fight the Germans immediately and therefore relied on the Vichyite incumbents. He resisted de Gaulle's call for a purge (épuration) of all former Vichy collaborators.

Giraud started to become more critical of Vichy (notably in a speech written by advisor Jean Monnet). In June 1943, Free France and the Algiers regime merged: De Gaulle and Giraud created the unified French Committee of National Liberation.

== Formation ==
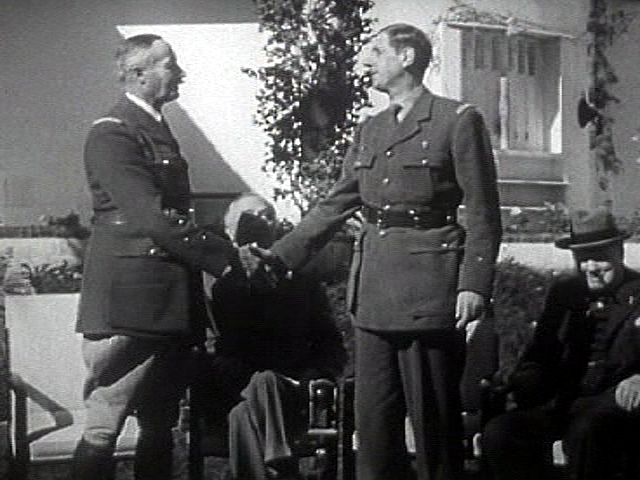
Henri Giraud and de Gaulle

The Committee was formed on 3 June 1943 in Algiers, the capital of French Algeria Giraud and de Gaulle served jointly as co-presidents of the committee. The charter of the body affirmed its commitment to "re-establish all French liberties, the laws of the Republic and the Republican regime." The committee saw itself as a source of unity and representation for the French nation. The Vichy regime was decried as illegitimate over its collaboration with Nazi Germany. The Committee received mixed responses from the Allies; the U.S. and Britain considered it a war-time body with restricted functions, being different from a future government of liberated France. The Committee soon expanded its membership, developed a distinctive administrative body and incorporated as the Provisional Consultative Assembly, creating an organized, representative government within itself. With Allied recognition, the Committee and its leaders, Gens. Giraud and de Gaulle enjoyed considerable popular support within France and the French resistance, thus becoming the forerunners in the process to form a provisional government for France as liberation approached. However, Charles de Gaulle politically outmaneuvered Gen. Giraud, and asserted complete control and leadership over the Committee.

== Provisional government ==
With the Allied invasion of Normandy, the Committee moved its headquarters to London, and in August 1944 the Committee moved to Paris, following the liberation of France by Allied forces. In September, Allied forces recognized the Committee as the legitimate, provisional government of France, whereupon the Committee reorganized itself under the presidency of Charles de Gaulle, incorporating representatives of various French political parties such as the Socialists and French Communists. The Committee also began the process of writing a new constitution to found the French Fourth Republic. However, Charles de Gaulle resigned in 1946 over the provisional legislature's refusal to grant more powers to the President and owing to the in-fighting between various political factions and the Communists.

== See also ==
- Free France
