= Commissioner of the Republic =

At different periods the French Republic had various functionaries entitled Commissioner of the Republic. They were generally representatives of the central government to the regional governments, merged into the functions of prefects. The name commissioner was chosen in periods when the central government needed confirming, or of periods where that government changed its functioning. See :

- the Commissioner of the Republic, replaced the prefect from March to July 1848;
- the Commissioner of the Republic (Provisional Government) (1944–1946);
- the Commissaire de la République, name of the Prefect from 1981 to 1988.

== See also ==
- Commissioner of the government (France)
