= Academic rector in France =

Rector of Academy
Occupation
- Names: Recteur d'académie
- Occupation type: Civil servant
- Activity sectors: Education, Administration

Description
- Competencies: Academic leadership, policy implementation, regional management
- Education required: Doctorate or equivalent qualifications
- Fields of employment: French Ministry of National Education
- Related jobs: University president, Prefect

An Academic rector (Recteur d'académie) in France is a high-ranking civil servant responsible for managing an academic region, or in some cases, an academic district. The academic regions are administrative divisions under the jurisdiction of the French Ministry of National Education and, for higher education, the Ministry of Higher Education.

The role of rector was established by Napoleon through a decree on March 17, 1808, following the law of May 10, 1806, which created the University of France. This legal framework granted the state exclusive authority over public education across the French Empire, solidifying what is often described as a "French exception."

== Appointment ==
Historically, rectors were required to hold the highest academic qualifications, such as a doctoral degree or an habilitation à diriger des recherches. Rectors were originally appointed solely from among university professors. Since a decree issued on July 29, 2010, exceptions allow up to 40% of rectors to be appointed without a doctoral degree, provided their qualifications are assessed by a commission. This commission, chaired by a Councillor of State, includes representatives from the Court of Audit and senior officials from the Ministry of Education.

== Responsibilities ==
The Rector of academy serves as the representative of the central government within an academic region, a unique French administrative structure comprising multiple departments and universities. Rectors oversee education policy implementation from primary schools to universities, ensuring alignment with national directives. They manage the allocation of resources, supervise academic personnel, and coordinate educational services across schools, universities, and regional administrative offices.

In addition, rectors are responsible for:

- Coordinating education policy across their region, from preschool to higher education.
- Representing the Ministry of Education in local government and inter-agency discussions.
- Administering examinations and certifications.
- Monitoring compliance with national education laws and standards.
- Reporting directly to the Minister of National Education on regional educational matters.

=== Regional Rectors ===
Since January 1, 2016, France introduced regional academic divisions to correspond with administrative regions. A Regional Rector (Recteur de région académique) is appointed among the rectors in each region to harmonize policies and represent the Ministry of Education at the regional level. They work closely with the regional prefects and regional councils. In regions with multiple academies, the Regional Rector chairs a committee to coordinate policies on education and research.

== Academic Robes ==
The rectors' traditional robes, derived from the attire of the Imperial University, symbolize their authority and academic heritage. These robes are worn during official ceremonies and reflect the historical significance of their role.

== Notable Firsts ==
In 1973, Alice Saunier-Seïté became the first woman to be appointed as Rector of an academy, for Reims Academy.
