= Hérouvillette =

- Commune
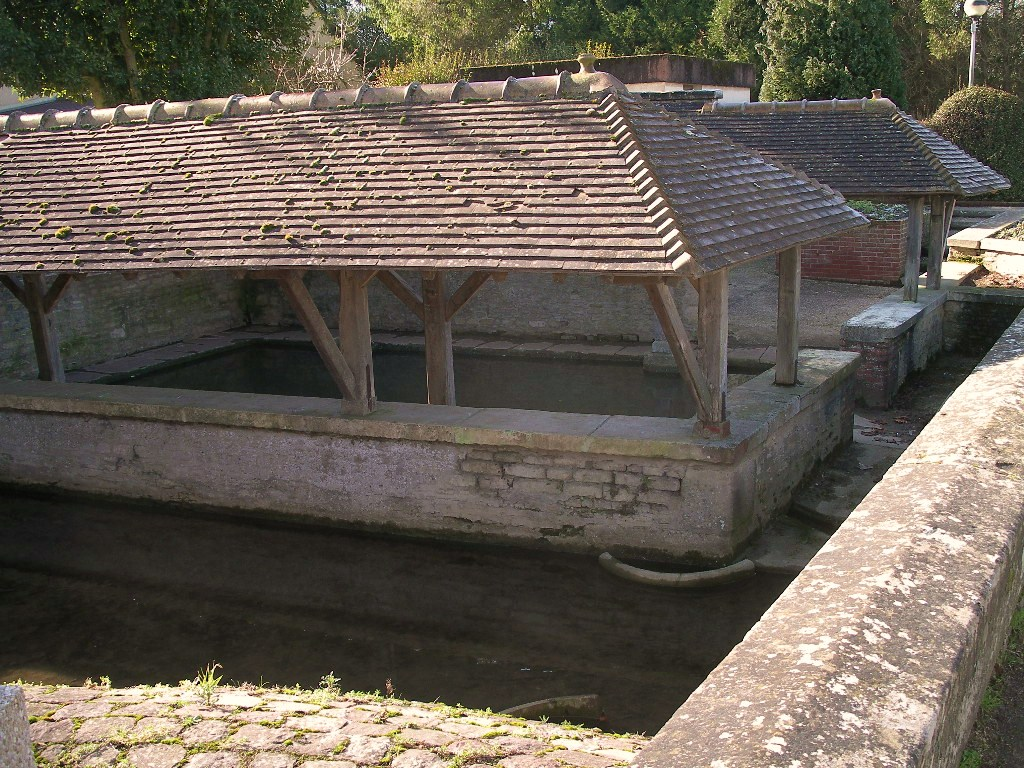
- The washhouse in Hérouvillette
- Location of Hérouvillette
- Location within France Location within Normandy
- Coordinates: 49°13′21″N 0°14′34″W
- Country: France
- Region: Normandy
- Department: Calvados
- Arrondissement: Lisieux
- Canton: Cabourg
- Intercommunality: CC Normandie-Cabourg-Pays d'Auge

Government
  - Mayor (2020–2026): Martine Patourel
- Area^{1}: 4.00 km^{2} (1.54 sq mi)
- Elevation: 30 m (98 ft)
- Highest elevation: 45 m (148 ft)
- Lowest elevation: 8 m (26 ft)
- Population (2023): 1,354
  - Density: 338/km^{2} (877/sq mi)
- Time zone: UTC+01:00 (CET)
  - Summer (DST): UTC+02:00 (CEST)
- INSEE/Postal code: 14328 /14850
- ^{1} French Land Register data, which excludes lakes, ponds, glaciers > 1 km^{2} (0.386 sq mi or 247 acres) and river estuaries.

Hérouvillette (French pronunciation: [eʁuvilɛt]) is a commune in the Calvados department in the Normandy region in northwestern France.

== Population ==
Historical population
Year	Pop.	±% p.a.
1968	810	—
1975	806	−0.07%
1982	765	−0.74%
1990	1,190	+5.68%
1999	1,119	−0.68%
2007	1,100	−0.21%
2012	1,140	+0.72%
2017	1,275	+2.26%
2023	1,354	+1.01%
Source: INSEE

== Places and monuments ==
- Hérouvillette: Church of the "Nativité-de-Notre-Dame" (XIV).
- Sainte-Honorine-la-Chardronnette: Church of Sainte-Honorine (XVIII).
- Lavoir on the "Aiguillon".
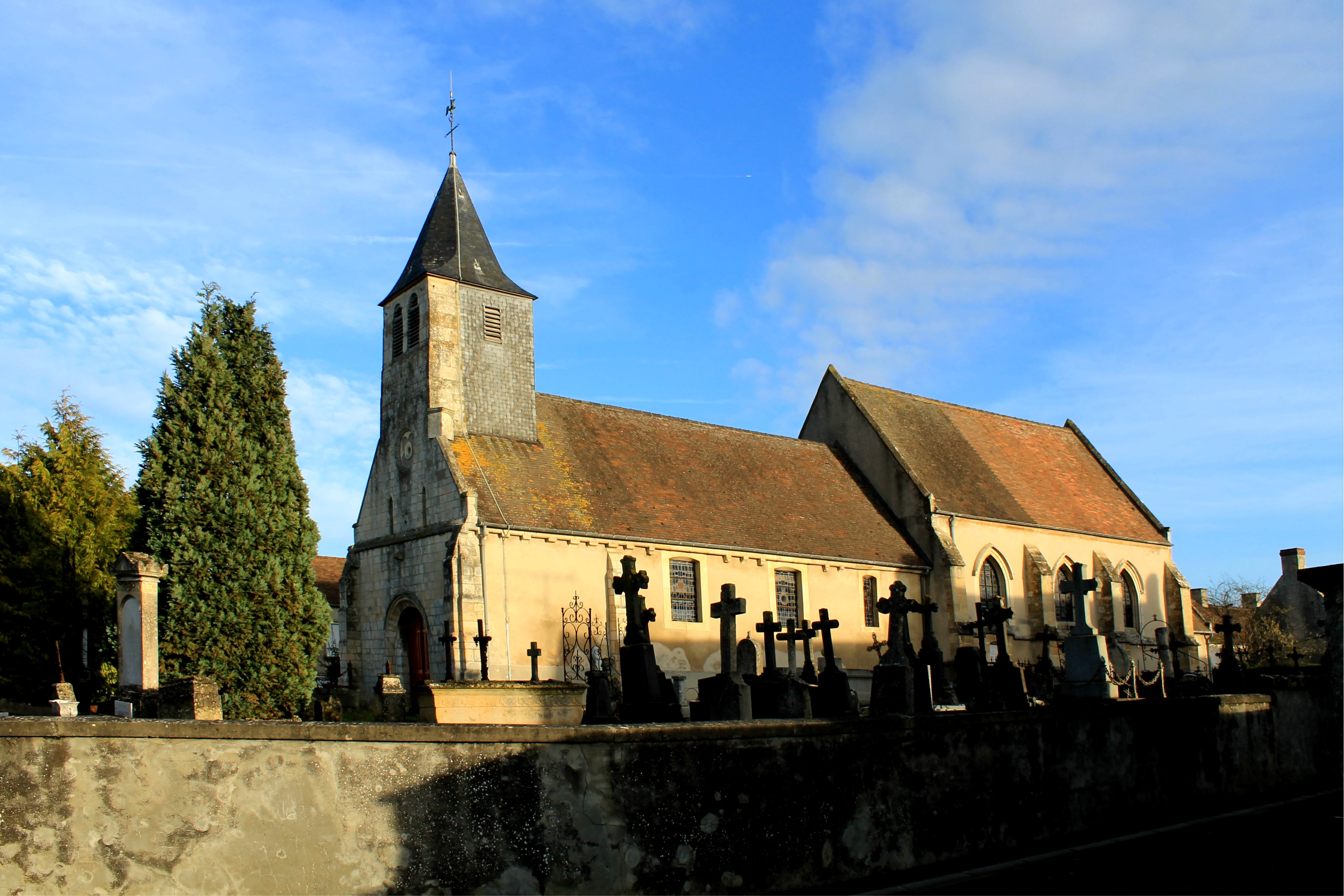
Church of the "Nativité-de-Notre-Dame".

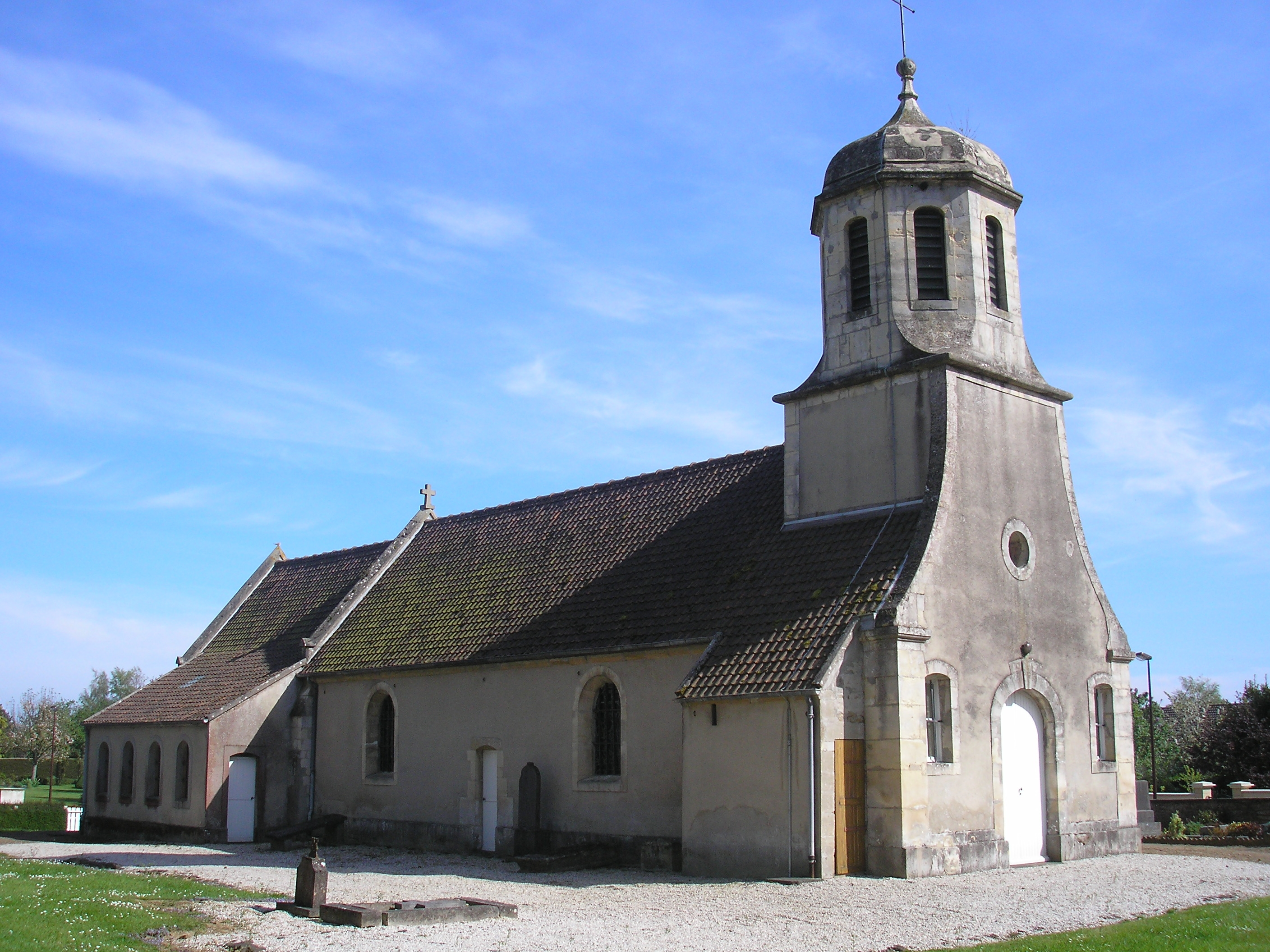
Church of Sainte-Honorine.

== See also ==
- Communes of the Calvados department
