= AM-Franc =

Currency used in Allied-occupied France

Unit
- Nickname: Billet drapeau

Denominations
- Banknotes: 2, 5, 10, 50, 100, 500, 1,000, 5,000 francs

Demographics
- User(s): (France) France, under allied-occupation

Issuance
- Central bank: Allied Military Government for Occupied Territories
- This infobox shows the latest status before this currency was rendered obsolete.

The "flag ticket" franc (French: Billet drapeau) was a currency issued by the United States for use in Allied-occupied France in the wake of the Battle of Normandy. With the swift take-over of sovereignty by General Charles de Gaulle, who considered the US occupation franc as "counterfeit money", the currency rapidly faded out of use in favour of the pre-war French franc.

Specimen type set of the Supplemental French Franc, First Issue (1944)
Denomination	Obverse	Reverse
2 Francs		
5 Francs		
10 Francs		
50 Francs		
100 Francs		
500 Francs		
1,000 Francs		
5,000 Francs		

== Gallery ==
AMC Francs
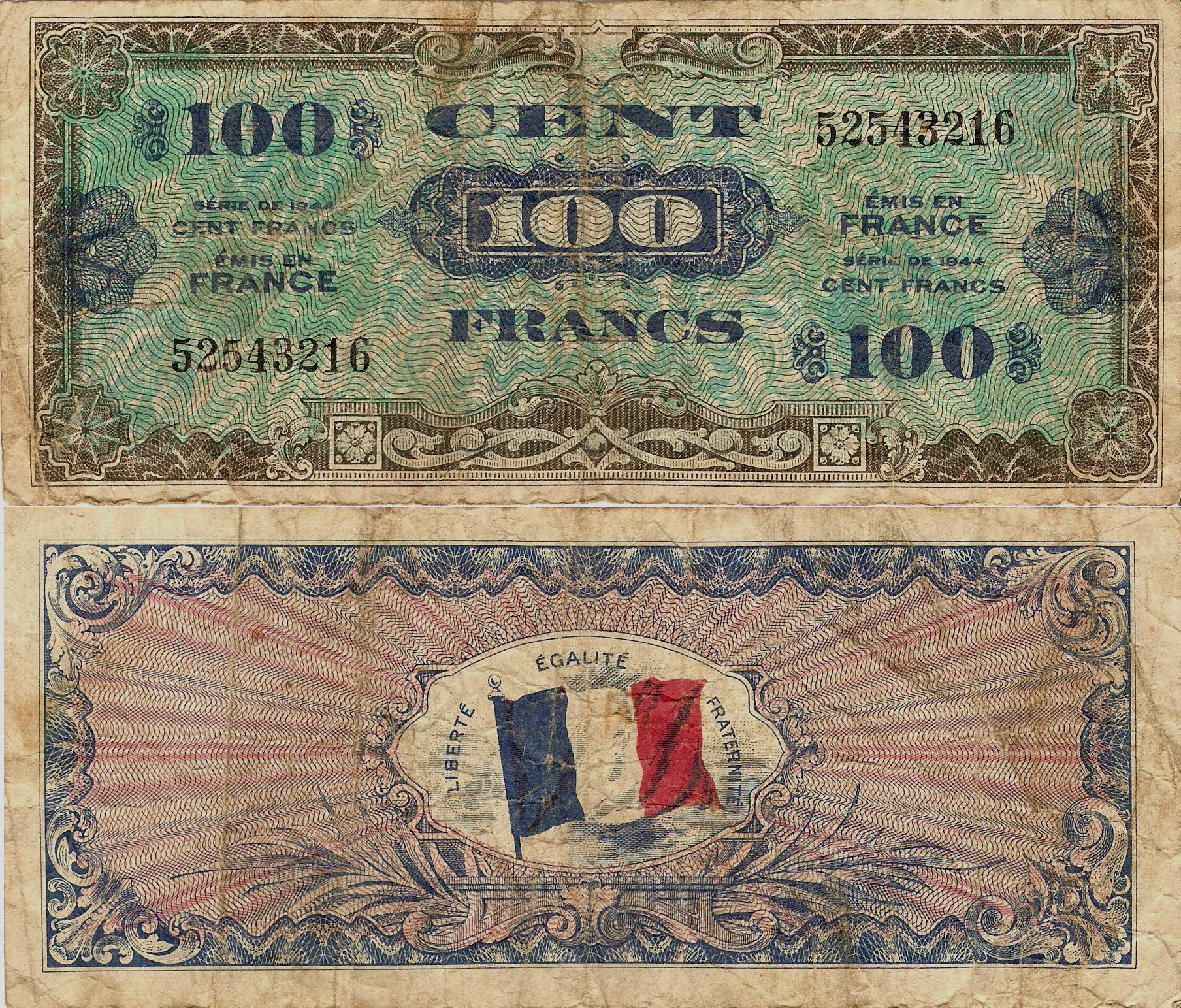
100

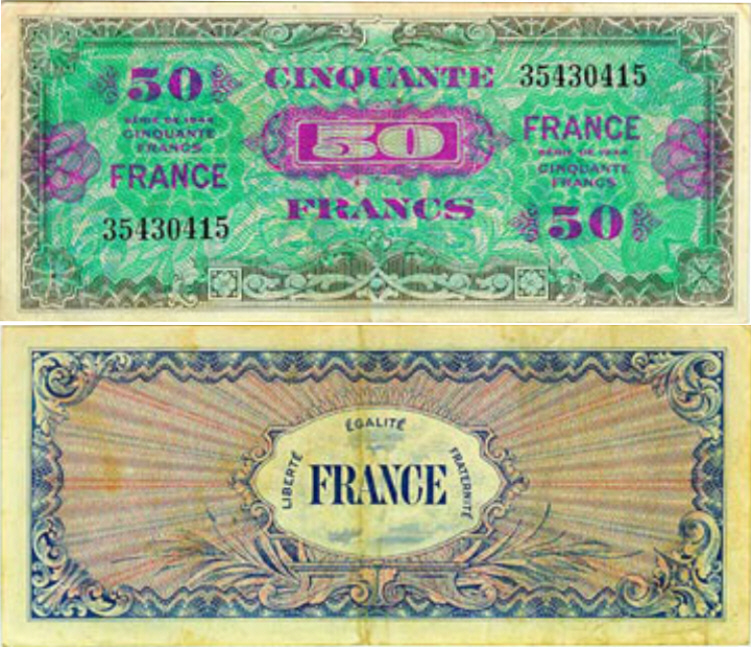
50

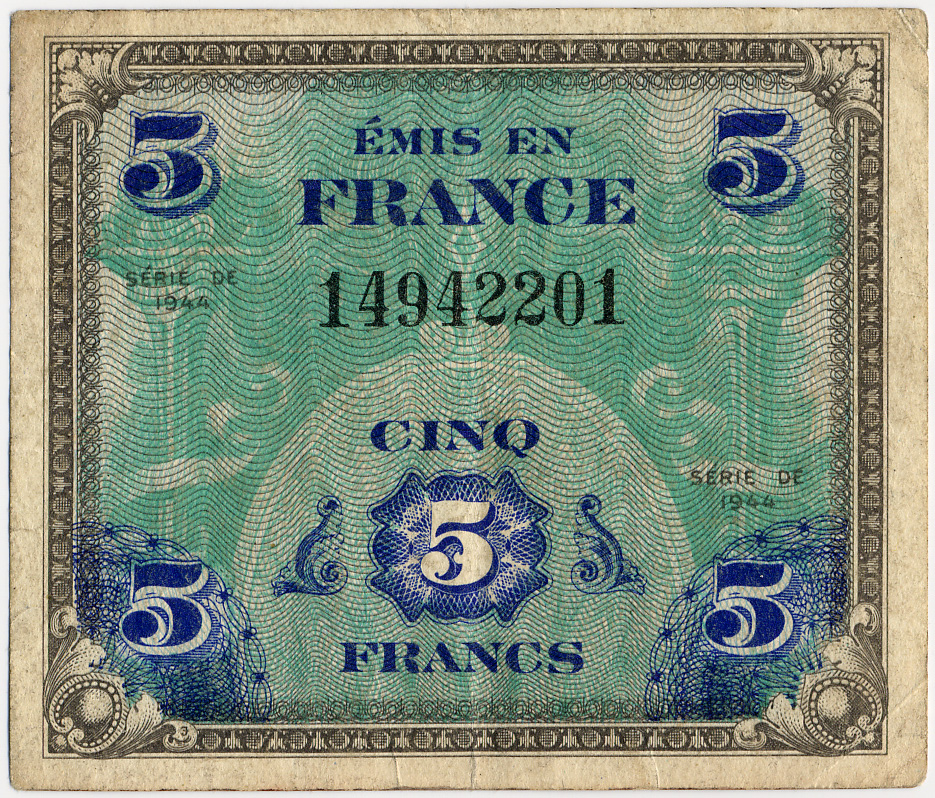
5

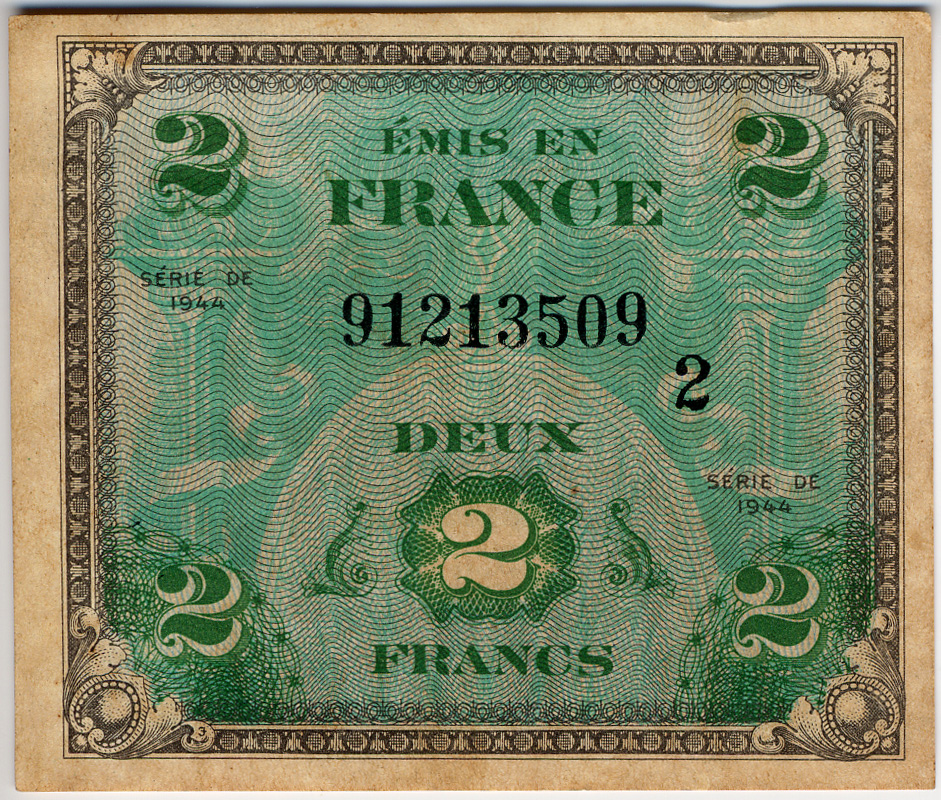
2

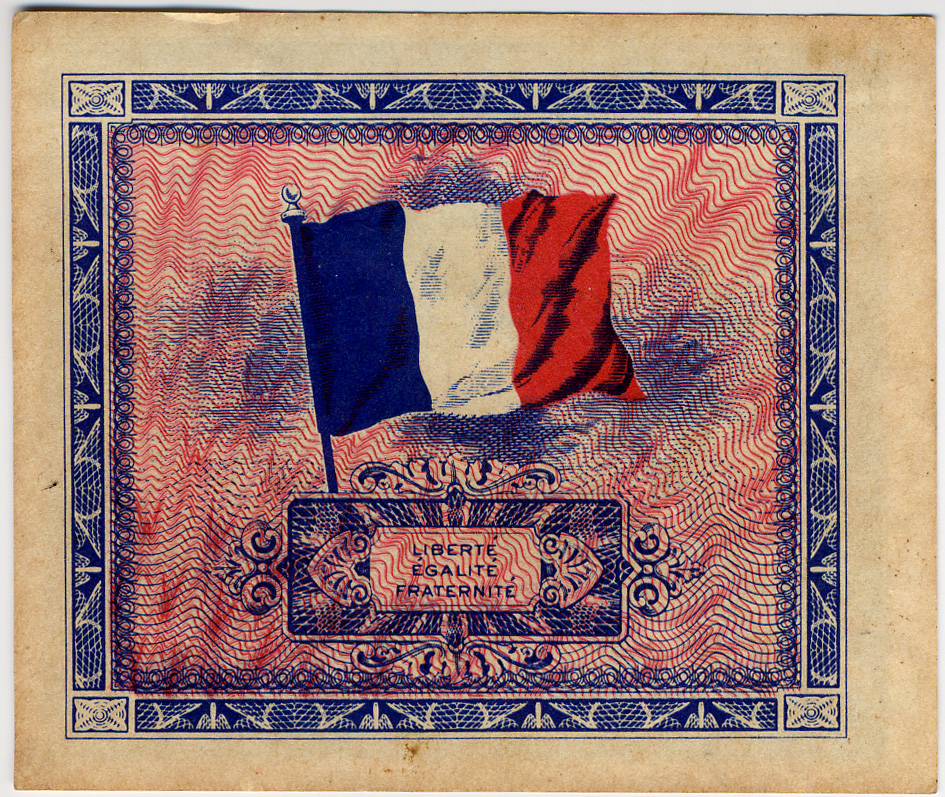
2

== See also ==
- Franc CFA
