= André Philip =

French politician (1902–70)

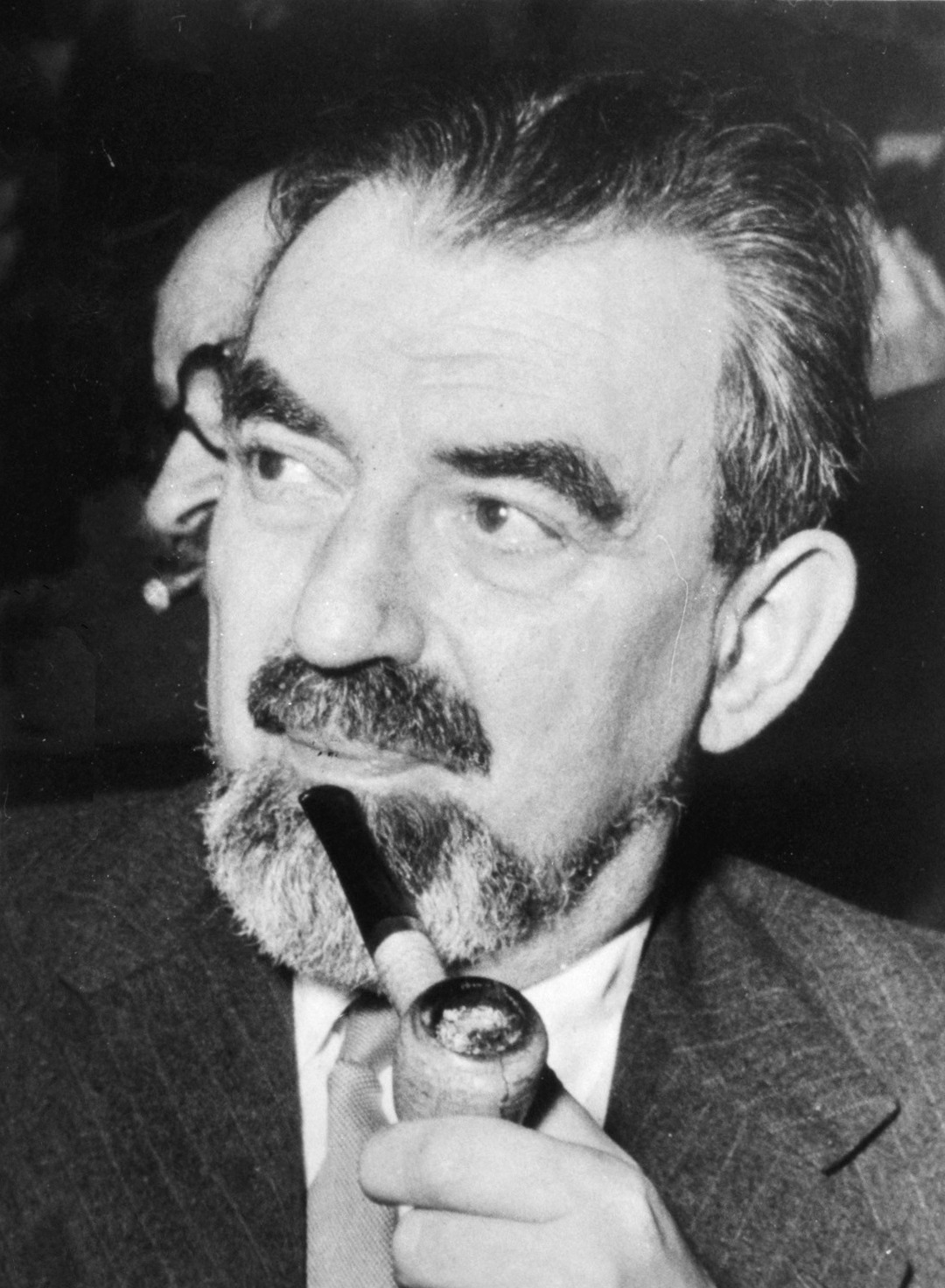
Philip in 1946

André Philip (28 June 1902 – 5 July 1970) was a French politician of the SFIO who served in 1942 as Interior Minister under the Free French provisional government of General Charles de Gaulle. He also served as a finance minister in 1946 and part of 1947 in the Socialist-led governments of Felix Gouin, Leon Blum and Paul Ramadier.
