= Provisional Government of the French Republic =

Interim government of France (1944–1946)

French Republic République française
- 1944–1946
- Flag Emblem
- Motto: "Liberté, Égalité, Fraternité" "Liberty, Equality, Fraternity"
- Anthem: "La Marseillaise"
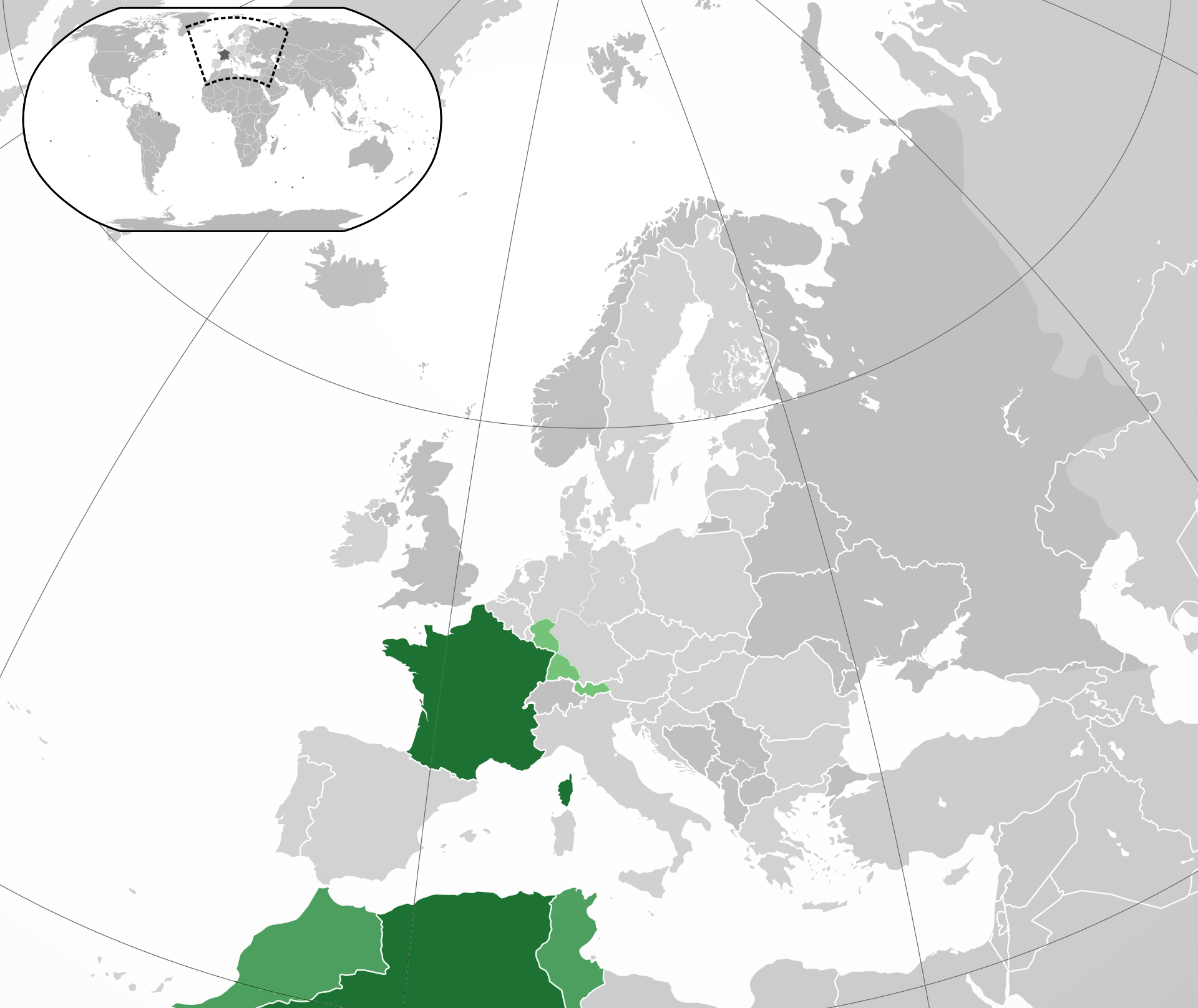
- France; French protectorates; French occupation zones in Germany and Austria

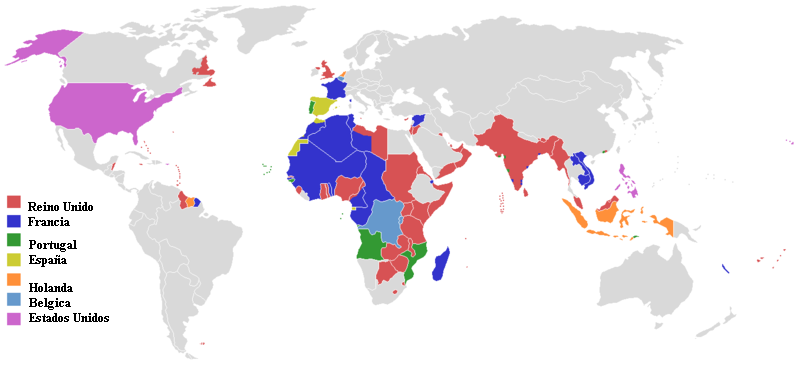
- Colonial empires in 1945. (France shown in blue)
- Status: Provisional government
- Capital: Algiers (de facto, 3 June – 31 August 1944); Paris (de jure; de facto from 31 August 1944)
- Common languages: French
- Religion: Secular state In Alsace–Lorraine: Roman Catholicism; Calvinism; Lutheranism; Judaism
- Government: Tripartisme
- Chairman
  - 1944–1946: Charles de Gaulle
  - 1946: Félix Gouin
  - 1946: Georges Bidault
  - 1946–1947: Léon Blum
- Legislature: National Assembly
- Historical era: World War II
  - Proclamation: 3 June 1944
  - Normandy landings: 6 June 1944
  - Provence landings: 15 August 1944
  - Liberation of Paris: 25 August 1944
  - Invasion of Germany: 19 March 1945
  - Surrender of Germany: 8 May 1945
  - Admitted to the UN: 24 October 1945
  - Fourth Republic: 27 October 1946

Area
- 1946 (including colonies): 14,200,000 km^{2} (5,500,000 sq mi)

Population
  - 1946 (including colonies): 200,000,000
- Currency: French franc
Preceded by
Free France
Vichy France
German Military Administration
Reichskommissariat Belgien-Nordfrankreich
Colonies of French Guiana, Martinique, Guadeloupe, and Reunion
Succeeded by
French Fourth Republic
French Union

The Provisional Government of the French Republic (PGFR; French: Gouvernement provisoire de la République française, GPRF) was a provisional government in France between 3 June 1944 and 27 October 1946, following the liberation of continental France from Vichy France after Operations Overlord and Dragoon, and lasting until the establishment of the French Fourth Republic. Its establishment marked the official restoration and re-establishment of a provisional French Republic, assuring continuity with the defunct French Third Republic.

It succeeded the French Committee of National Liberation (CFLN), which had been the provisional government of France in the overseas territories and metropolitan parts of the country (Algeria and Corsica) that had been liberated by the Free French. As the wartime government of France in 1944–1945, its main purposes were to handle the aftermath of the occupation of France and continue to wage war against Germany as one of the major Allies.

Its principal mission (in addition to the war) was to prepare the ground for a new constitutional order that resulted in the Fourth Republic. It also made several important reforms and political decisions, such as granting women the right to vote, founding the École nationale d'administration and laying the grounds of social security in France.

== Creation ==
The PGFR was officially created by the CFLN on 3 June 1944, the day before Charles de Gaulle arrived in London from Algiers on Winston Churchill's invitation, and three days before D-Day. The CFLN itself had been created exactly one year earlier through the uniting of de Gaulle's (Comité national français, or CNF) and Henri Giraud's organisations. Among its most immediate concerns were to ensure that France did not come under allied military administration, preserving the sovereignty of France and freeing allied troops for fighting on the front, something De Gaulle managed at an early stage through getting the Commissioners of the Republic recognised in liberated territories and through demonstrating popular support at an early stage.

After the liberation of Paris on 25 August 1944, it moved back to the capital, establishing a new "national unanimity" government on 9 September 1944 replacing Vichy France, including Gaullists, nationalists, socialists, communists and anarchists. Among its foreign policy goals was to secure a French occupation zone in Germany and a permanent UNSC seat. This was assured through a large military contribution on the western front.

== War ==
The GPRF set about raising new troops to participate in the advance to the Rhine and the invasion of Germany, using the French Forces of the Interior as military cadres and manpower pools of experienced fighters to allow a very large and rapid expansion of the French Liberation Army (Armée française de la Libération). It was well equipped and well supplied despite the economic disruption brought by the occupation thanks to Lend-Lease, and grew from 500,000 men in the summer of 1944 to over 1,300,000 by V-E day, making it the fourth largest Allied army in Europe.

The French 2nd Armoured Division, tip of the spear of the Free French forces that had participated in the Normandy Campaign and liberated Paris, went on to liberate Strasbourg on 23 November 1944, thus fulfilling the Oath of Kufra made by its commanding officer General Leclerc almost four years earlier. The unit under his command, barely above company size when it had captured the Italian fort, had grown into a full-strength armoured division.

The spearhead of the Free French First Army that had landed in Provence was the I Corps. Its leading unit, the French 1st Armoured Division, was the first Western Allied unit to reach the Rhône (25 August 1944), the Rhine (19 November 1944) and the Danube (21 April 1945). On 22 April 1945, it captured the Sigmaringen enclave in Baden-Württemberg, where the last Vichy regime exiles, including Marshal Philippe Pétain, were hosted by the Germans in one of the ancestral castles of the Hohenzollern dynasty.

They participated in stopping Operation Nordwind, the final German major offensive on the western front in January 1945, and in collapsing the Colmar Pocket in January–February 1945, capturing and destroying most of the German XIXth Army.

== Position on the Vichy regime ==
At the Hôtel de Ville, Paris on 25 August 1944, where the French Second Republic and French Third Republic had been declared, de Gaulle explicitly refused to declare a new republic. When Georges Bidault of the French Resistance said that de Gaulle could declare the restoration of the republic, the general replied that he could not, because the republic had never ceased to exist. De Gaulle used his old office as a junior cabinet minister at the Ministry of War as symbol of the continuity between the pre- and post-Vichy governments. He refused to make a speech to open the first meeting of the provisional government in September 1944, stating that the republic continued but in reorganized form.

Theoretically, France returned to the moment just before midnight on 17 June 1940 when Pétain took power. The provisional government considered the Vichy regime (officially: "French State") to have been unconstitutional and all its actions therefore taken without legitimate authority and illegal. All "constitutional acts, legislative or regulatory" taken by the Vichy government, as well as decrees taken to implement them, were declared null and void by the Ordinance of 9 August 1944.

However, since mass cancellation of all decisions taken by Vichy was impractical, it was decided that any repeal of specific ordinances or decrees was to be expressly acknowledged by the government. The 9 August ordinance only invalidated those it listed. The ordinance provided that acts not expressly noted as nullified in the ordinance were to continue to receive "provisional application". Many acts were explicitly repealed, including all acts that Vichy had called "constitutional acts", all acts that discriminated against Jews, all acts related to so-called "secret societies" (e.g., Freemasons), and all acts that established special tribunals.

While the criminal behavior of Vichy France was consistently acknowledged, this point of view denied any responsibility of the state of France, alleging that acts committed between 1940 and 1944 were unconstitutional acts devoid of legitimacy. De Gaulle said that Vichy's actions were "null and void". He and others emphasized the unclear conditions of the June 1940 vote granting full powers to Pétain, which was refused by the minority of Vichy 80. In particular, coercive measures used by Pierre Laval have been denounced by those historians who hold that the vote did not, therefore, have constitutional legality. In later years, de Gaulle's position was reiterated by President François Mitterrand. "I will not apologize in the name of France. The Republic had nothing to do with this. I do not believe France is responsible", he said in September 1994. Jacques Chirac, who became president in 1995, was the first French leader to accept collective guilt for Vichy's deeds, stating on the anniversary of the July 1942 Vel' d'Hiv Roundup that France had committed an "irreparable" act.

== Politics ==
The GPRF was dominated by the tripartisme alliance between the French Communist Party (PCF), claiming itself to be the parti des 75,000 fusillés ("party of the 75,000 shot") because of its role in the Resistance, the French Section of the Workers' International (SFIO, socialist party) and the Christian democratic Popular Republican Movement (MRP), led by Georges Bidault. This alliance between the three political parties lasted until the May 1947 crisis during which Maurice Thorez, vice-premier, and four other Communist ministers were expelled from the government, both in France and in Italy. Along with the acceptance of the Marshall Plan, refused by countries which had fallen under the influence of the USSR, this marked the official beginning of the Cold War in these countries.

It started decolonisation by recognising the independence of the Democratic Republic of Vietnam, but the refusal to include Cochinchina in the new state led to the First Indochina War.

== Actions ==
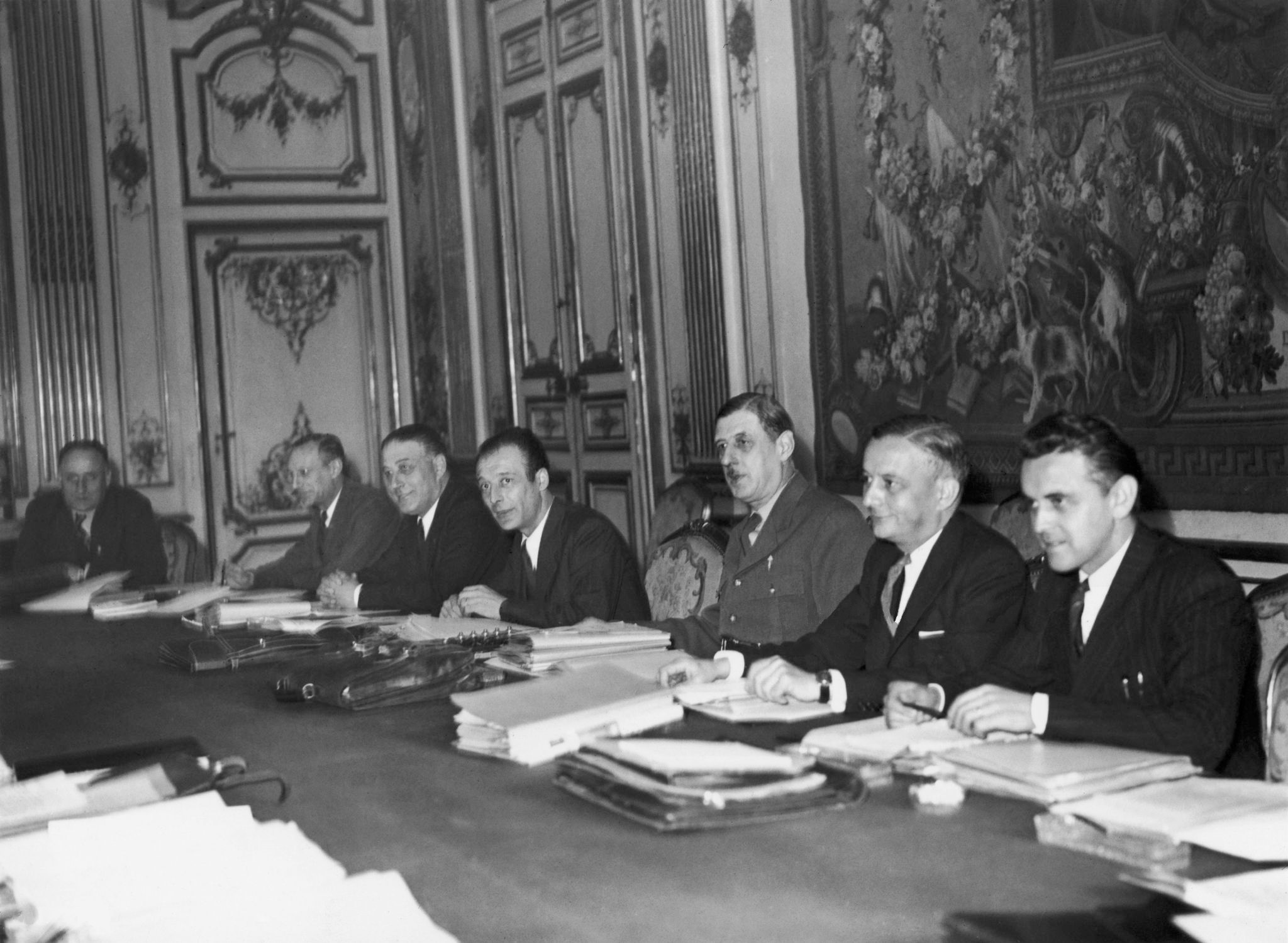
General Charles de Gaulle and the ministers of the Provisional Government, 2 November 1945

Although the GPRF was active only from 1944 to 1946, it had a lasting influence, in particular regarding the enacting of labour laws which were put forward by the National Council of the Resistance, the umbrella organisation which united all resistance movements, in particular the Communist Front National. The Front National was the political front of the Francs-Tireurs et Partisans (FTP) resistance movement. In addition to de Gaulle's edicts in 1944 granting, for the first time in France, right of vote to women, the GPRF passed various labour laws, including the 11 October 1946 act establishing occupational medicine. It also appointed commissioners to fulfill its aims.

Vichy loyalists were put on trial by the GPRF in legal purges (épuration légale), and a number were executed for treason, among them Pierre Laval, Vichy's prime minister in 1942–44. Marshal Philippe Pétain, "Chief of the French State" and Verdun hero, was also condemned to death but his sentence was commuted to life imprisonment. Thousands of collaborators were summarily executed by local Resistance forces in so-called "savage purges" (épuration sauvage).

Collaborationist paramilitary and political organizations, such as the Milice and the Service d'ordre légionnaire ("Legionary Order Service"), were also disbanded.

The provisional government also took steps to replace local governments, including governments that had been suppressed by the Vichy regime, through new elections or by extending the terms of those who had been elected no later than 1939.

== Reforms ==
The provisional government resumed the project started in 1936 by Jean Zay to create a national administration school (École nationale d'administration), which was founded on 9 October 1945, to ensure high-ranking civil servants of consistent high quality, as well as allow gifted people to reach these functions regardless of social origin.

The right to vote had been granted to women by the CFLN on 21 April 1944, and was confirmed by the GPRF with the 5 October 1944 decree. They went to the polls for the first time in the local elections of 29 April 1945.

It passed decisions about Social Security (Sécurité sociale, decree of 19 October 1945), and child benefits (law of 22 August 1946), laying the foundations of the welfare state in France.

In the dirigist spirit, it created large state-owned companies, for instance by nationalising Renault and founding electricity company EDF and airline Air France.

== The new constitution ==
Another main objective of the GPRF under de Gaulle leadership was to give a voice to the people by organizing elections which took place on 21 October 1945. The polls saw the victory of the French Section of the Workers' International (SFIO), the French Communist Party (PCF) and the Popular Republican Movement (MRP), collecting three-quarters of the votes, and the referendum had an outcome of 96% of voters in favour of abolishing the Third Republic. Becoming a constituent assembly, the newly elected parliament was charged with drafting a constitution for a new fourth republic.

De Gaulle, favouring a stronger executive, resigned in disagreement with Communist ministers on 20 January 1946. A first draft constitution, supported by the left but denounced by de Gaulle and by centre and right-wing parties, was rejected by a referendum on 5 May 1946 resulting in the dissolution of parliament and the resignation of de Gaulle's successor Félix Gouin of the SFIO.

A new election for a Constituent Assembly of 1946 was held on 2 June 1946, marked by a strengthening of the MRP and the decline of the left. The constitutional project then shifted from pursuing unicameralism to bicameralism. The constitution of the Fourth Republic, established under the chairmanship of Georges Bidault (MRP), was finally adopted by the 13 October 1946 referendum.

Following the elections for a new Chamber of parliament held on 10 November 1946, former Popular Front leader Leon Blum became the Chairman of the last interim government on 16 December. One month later, Vincent Auriol succeeded Blum as President of the Republic, marking the entry into force of the institutions of the Fourth Republic.

== List of chairmen of the Provisional Government ==
Portrait	Chairman	Took office	Left office	Time in office	Party
Charles de Gaulle	Charles de Gaulle (1890–1970)	3 June 1944	26 January 1946	1 year, 237 days	Independent
Félix Gouin	Félix Gouin (1884–1977)	26 January 1946	24 June 1946	149 days	SFIO
Georges Bidault	Georges Bidault (1899–1983)	24 June 1946	28 November 1946	157 days	MRP
Vincent Auriol	Vincent Auriol (1884–1966); Acting	28 November 1946	16 December 1946	18 days	SFIO
Léon Blum	Léon Blum (1872–1950)	16 December 1946	22 January 1947	37 days	SFIO
