= Allied Military Government of Occupied Territories =

Military rule by Allied forces during World War II

- Merchant flag
- Official languages: English; Italian; French; German; Japanese
- Type: Military occupation government
- Currency: Allied Military Currency: AM-Lira; AM-Franc; AM-Schilling; AM-Mark; A yen; B yen

The Allied Military Government of Occupied Territories (originally abbreviated AMGOT, later AMG) was the form of military rule administered by Allied forces during and after World War II within former Axis-held territories they occupied. The first instance of this inter-Allied model of government of occupied territory was manifested in Sicily after Operation Husky in August 1943.

== Notable AMGOT ==
This form of controlled government was implemented in the states of Germany, Italy, Austria, and Japan, amongst others.

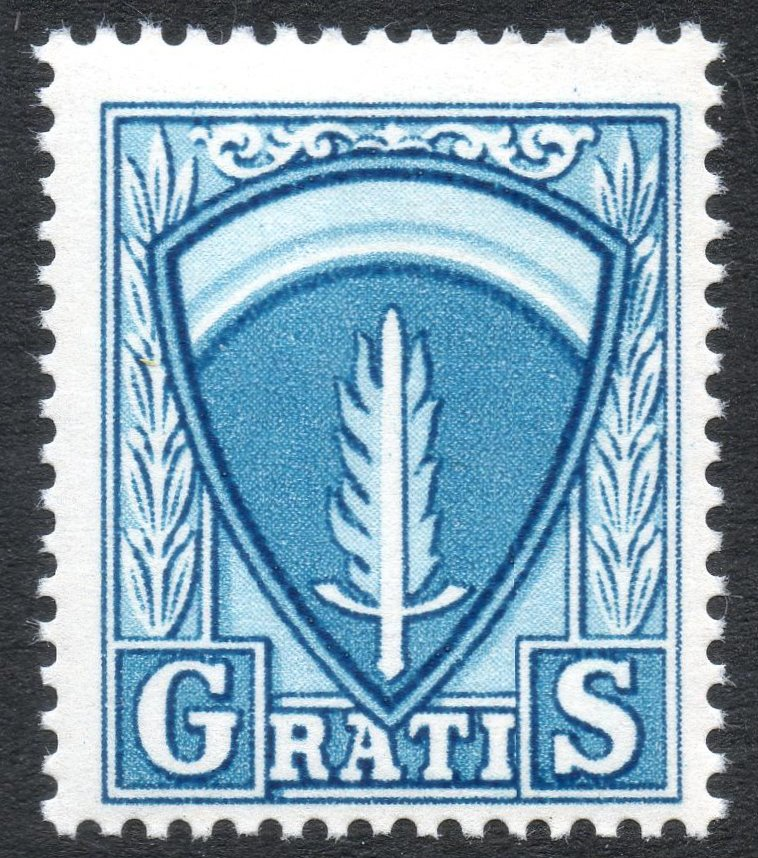
A franchise stamp issued by the Allied Military Government (AMG) in 1948 to exempt travelers from fees when crossing borders.

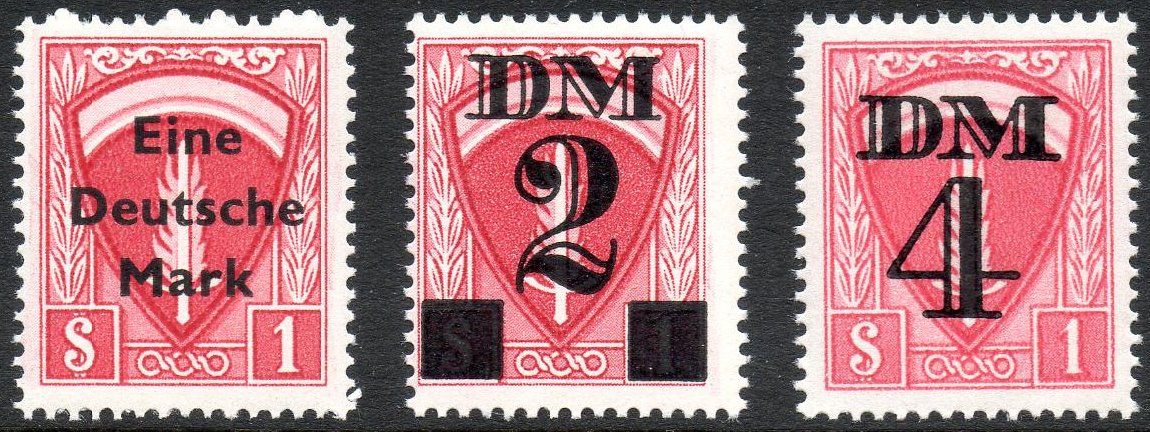
Three revenue stamps of the AMG from 1950 and 1951.

=== France ===
The United States military government in France was a planned government of liberated France that was to be run by the American Army. Despite support from Roosevelt, this was abandoned in favour of France being run by the Provisional Government of the French Republic led by Charles de Gaulle.

=== Germany ===
After the German surrender, control of German territory was divided amongst the four powers of the Soviet Union, the United States, the United Kingdom and France.

=== Italy ===
==== Sicily ====
After Operation Husky, with the Allied Invasion of Sicily on July 10, 1943, the Allied Military Government of Occupied Territories (AMGOT) was established under major-general Francis Rodd, 2nd Baron Rennell (as Chief Civil Affairs Officer, Allied Military Government Italy) and US Army Civil Affairs officer colonel Charles Poletti.

Interviewed by the News Chronicle, Rennell was asked about the controversial decision to retain the services of the Carabinieri and other police and officials who had worked for the Fascist regime, and answered "They are doing an excellent job and deserve to be trusted. Their oath had been to the King, not to Mussolini. (...) We do not seek the support of any political group, neither anti-Fascists nor any others. For the time being, all political gatherings are forbidden in Sicily. We are a military administration, we have no mandate to make any political or social reforms."

In February 1944 the AMGOT handed over the administration to the Badoglio Cabinet. It continued to operate as "Allied Military Government" in the occupied Italian territories until the end of the war.

==== Free Territory of Trieste ====
The Allied Military Government of the Free Territory of Trieste was a follow-on from the military government of occupied Italy. The Free Territory of Trieste was created by the 16th UN Security Council Resolution adopted at the 91st meeting by 10 votes to none, with 1 abstention (Australia), 10 January 1947, and established by the signature of the Treaty of Peace with Italy, 10 February 1947, then entered in force from 15 September 1947. The instrument for the provisional regime of the Free Territory of Trieste provides that the allied and associated military forces govern the territory. The historical situation saw the division into two administration areas called Zone A, including the capital Trieste and the Free Port of Trieste (ports areas within the boundaries delineated in 1939) and Zone B comprising the area of the cities of Koper, Izola, Umag, Buje and Novigrad. Zone A was assigned to the Anglo-Americans and Zone B to the Yugoslavs. Military governments ended when in November 1954 under the provisions of the London Memorandum, among the United States, United Kingdom, Italy and Yugoslavia, to become a civil administration. Zone A was assigned to Italy (not yet a member of the United Nations) and Zone B was assigned to Yugoslavia.

=== Korea ===
In Korea the United States Army Military Government in Korea governed the southern half of the peninsula from September 8, 1945 to August 15, 1948.

== See also ==
- Allied Commission
- A Bell for Adano is a 1944 novel by John Hersey centered on the AMGOT control of the fictional Italian village of Adano based on the real-life village of Licata, Italy.
