= List of people involved with the French Resistance =

People involved with the French Resistance include:

== A ==
- José Aboulker (1920–2009)
- Berty Albrecht (1893–1943)
- Dimitri Amilakhvari (1906–1942), French-Georgian Prince
- Louis Aragon (1897–1982), poet, novelist and editor, husband of Elsa Triolet
- Raymond Aron (1905–1983)
- Pierre Arrighi (1921–1944)
- Emmanuel d'Astier de la Vigerie (1900–1969)
- Henri d'Astier de la Vigerie (1897–1952), Roman Catholic conservative politician
- Lucie Aubrac (1912–2007)
- Marie-Thérèse Auffray (1912–1990), artist
- Jacqueline Auriol (1917–2000)
- Vera Atkins, (1907–2000), SOE

== B ==
- Jean Babilée (1923-2014), prominent French ballet dancer and choreographer
- Josephine Baker (1906–1975), African American singer, dancer,
- Joe Balfe O.B.E and family Hornoy-le- Bourg Amiens (The Balfe Line)
- Louis Bancel (1926–1978), sculptor
- Raoul Batany (1926–1944), assassin of Arthur Marissal
- Samuel Beckett (1906–1989), Irish writer, winner of the 1969 Nobel Prize in Literature
- Georges Bégué (1911–1993), SOE
- Robert Benoist (1895–1944)
- Marie Bérenger (1865–1944), French Resistance activist
- Charles Berty (1911–1944), French professional cyclist
- Georges Bidault (1899–1983)
- Monique de Bissy (1923–2009)
- Georges Blind (1904–1944)
- André Bloch (French Resistance) (1914–1942)
- Denise Bloch (1916–1945)
- Marc Bloch (1886–1944), historian, founded the Annales School of historiography
- France Bloch-Sérazin (1913–1943), chemist, bomb-maker for the Resistance
- Tony Bloncourt (1921–1942)
- Marc Boegner (1881–1970)
- Cristina Luca Boico (1916–2002)
- Fernand Bonnier de La Chapelle (1922–1942), assassinated admiral François Darlan
- Claude Bourdet (1909–1996), co-founder of Combat
- Éliane Brault (1898–1982)
- Gilberte Brossolette (1905–2004), French journalist and politician
- Pierre Brossolette (1903–1944)

== C ==
- Claude Cahun (1894–1954), French photographer, sculptor and writer
- Albert Camus (1913–1960), French novelist, winner of the 1957 Nobel Prize in Literature
- Marcel Carné (1906–1996), French film director
- Henri Cartier-Bresson (1908–2004), French photographer
- Rouben Melik (1921–2007), French-Armenian poet
- Shapour Bakhtiar (1914–1991), later to become Prime minister of Iran during last days of Iranian Revolution
- Roger Carcassonne (1911–1991)
- Donald Caskie (1902–1983)
- Neus Català (1915–2019), Spanish Holocaust survivor and Republican militan
- Jean Cavaillès (1903–1944)
- Jacques Chaban-Delmas (1915–2000)
- René Char (1907–1988)
- Marie-Louise Charpentier (1905–1998)
- Sidney Chouraqui (1914–2018)
- Peter Churchill (1909–1972), SOE
- Eugène Claudius-Petit (1907–1989)
- Marianne Cohn (1922–1944)
- Roger Coquoin (1897–1943)
- Daniel Cordier (1920–2020), secretary of Jean Moulin and later historian
- René-Yves Creston (1898–1964), Breton artist and ethnographer
- Nancy Cunard (1896–1965), poet, writer and anarchist who worked in London as a translator

== D ==
- Apolônio de Carvalho (1912–2005), Brazilian revolutionary
- Jacques Decour (1910–1942), French writer
- Charlotte Delbo (1913–1985)
- Catherine Dior (1917–2008) sister of French Couturier, Christian Dior
- Jacques Desoubrie (1922–1949)
- Martha Desrumeaux (1897–1982)
- Eugène Droulers (1917-1945)
- François Ducaud-Bourget (1897–1984), Roman Catholic priest
- Jacques Duclos (1896–1975)
- Marguerite Duras (1914–1996), French writer

== E ==
- Jacques Ellul (1912–1994)
- Paul Éluard (1895–1952), French poet
- Henri Honoré d'Estienne d'Orves (1901–1941), French right wing naval officer
- Joseph Epstein (1911–1944)

== F ==
- Valentin Feldman (1909–1942), French philosopher
- Henri Fertet (1926–1943), schoolboy and Resistance fighter
- Antoinette Feuerwerker (1912–2003), wife of David Feuerwerker, member of Combat
- David Feuerwerker, (1912–1980), rabbi of Brive-la-Gaillarde, member of Combat
- Marie-Madeleine Fourcade (1909–1989)
- Henri Frager (1897–1944)
- Henri Frenay (1905–1988), founder of Combat, minister in the first post-liberation government
- Varian Fry (1907–1967), American journalist

== G ==
- Cristino García (1914–1946)
- Geneviève de Gaulle-Anthonioz (1920–2002), niece of General de Gaulle
- Salomon Gluck (1914–1944), physician
- John Howard Griffin (1920–1980), journalist and author best known for his 1959 project to temporarily pass as a black man and journey through the Deep South in order to see life and segregation from the other side of the color line first-hand published under the title Black Like Me (1961)
- Gheorghe Gaston Grossmann (1918–2010) (changed his name from Grossman to Marin after he returned to Romania after World War II)
- Henri Marie Joseph Grouès (1912–2007), better known as Abbé Pierre, Catholic priest and Maquis
- William Grover-Williams (1903–1945), Anglo-French racing driver
- Germaine Guérin, brothel owner in Lyons
- Albert Guérisse (1911–1989)
- Georges Guingouin (1913–2005), communist resistance
- Charles Geffroy (1920–1997), French Resistance

== H ==
- Virginia Hall (1906–1982), American spy, SOE
- Ernest Hemingway (1899–1961), American writer and journalist
- Boris Holban (1908–2004), leader of the FTP-MOI
- Michel Hollard (1898–1993)
- Wilhelm Holst (1895–1949) SOE
- Arthur Honegger (1892–1955)
- André Hue (1923–2005), SOE
- Max Hymans (1900–1961)

== I ==
- René Iché (1897–1954), artist, sculptor

== J ==
- Josèphe Jacquiot (1910-1995)
- Vladimir Jankélévitch (1903–1985)
- Éliane Jeannin-Garreau (1911–1999)
- Louis Jourdan (1921–2015), French actor
- Germain Jousse (1895–1988)

== K ==
- Bernard Karsenty (1920–2007)
- Marcelle Kellermann
- Chana Kowalska (1899–1942), Polish Jewish painter and journalist
- Maurice Kriegel-Valrimont (1914–2006)

== L ==
- Marcel Langer (French Resistance) (1903–1943)
- Joseph Laniel (1889–1975)
- Germain Laur (1895–1952), French Resistance fighter and departmental leader of the Combat movement in Tarn. Deported to Auschwitz-Birkenau in 1944 and liberated in January 1945.
- Madeleine Lavigne (1912–1945), Isabelle, agent of the Special Operations Executive
- Suzanne Leclézio (1898–1987), French social worker, nurse
- Jacques Lecompte-Boinet (1905–1974)
- Édouard Le Jeune (1921–2017), former Senator
- André Leroi-Gourhan (1911–1986)
- André Le Troquer (1884–1963)
- Jacques Levi (1899–1971)
- Jacques Lusseyran (1924–1971)

== M ==
- André Malraux (1901–1976) ("Colonel Berger"), French writer and government minister
- Vincent Malerba (1925–2025)
- Missak Manouchian (1906–1944), poet, leader of the eponymous network as part of FTP-MOI
- Robert Marjolin (1911–1986)
- Suzanne Masson (1901–1943)
- Marie Médard (1921–2013)
- Lucien Julien Meline (1901–1943)
- Jean-Pierre Melville (1917–1973), French film director
- Pierre Mendès-France (1907–1982), French politician
- Pierre Meunier (1908–1996), General Secretary of the CNR
- Edmond Michelet (1899–1970), last to leave Dachau while aiding the sick, twice government minister after the war
- Jacques Monod (1910–1976), Nobel Prize in Physiology or Medicine (1965)
- Marcel Moore (1892–1972), French illustrator, designer, and photographer
- Jean Moulin (1899–1943), head of the CNR

== N ==
- Prince Louis Napoléon (1914–1997), pretender to the French Imperial throne
- Hélène Nautré (1904–1976), French politician
- Eileen Nearne (1921–2010), SOE, Agent Rose
- Camille Nicolas (1895–1967), French Resistance Leader
- Odette Nilès (1922–2023)
- Jean Maurice Paul Jules de Noailles (1893–1945), French nobleman and the 6th Duke of Ayen
- Suzanne Noël (1878–1954), French plastic surgeon

== P ==
- Andrée Peel (1905–2010), Agent Rose
- Édith Piaf (1915–1963), French singer
- Pablo Picasso (1881–1973, Spanish artist)
- Thérèse Pierre (1908–1943)
- Jean Pierre-Bloch (1905–1999)
- Christian Pineau (1904–1995)
- Gabriel Plançon (1919–1943), French resistance fighter
- Eliane Plewman (1917–1944), SOE
- Georges Politzer (1903–1942)
- Francis Ponge (1899–1988)
- Jean Prévost (1901–1944), writer, conceived and organized the Maquis du Vercors

== R ==
- Adrienne Ranc-Sakakini (1916–2014), member of F2 network in Marseille
- Paul Rassinier (1906–1967), member of Libération-Nord
- Adam Rayski (1913–2008), FTP-MOI leader
- Serge Ravanel (1920–2009)
- Danielle Georgette Reddé (1911–2007)
- Gilbert Renault (1904–1984)
- Jean-François Revel (1924–2006), French writer and philosopher
- Marc Riboud (1923–2016), photographer, participated in the Maquis du Vercors
- Madeleine Riffaud (1924–2024), French poet and war correspondent
- Yvonne Rokseth (1890–1948), French composer, musicologist, and teacher
- André Rogerie (1921–2014), French writer and Holocaust survivor
- Justus Rosenberg (1921–2021), Jewish-Polish professor of literature

== S ==
- Alexander Sachal (1924–2020), Russian artist
- Armand Salacrou (1899–1989)
- Raymond Samuel (1914–2012), alias Raymond Aubrac
- Solange Sanfourche (1922–2013), alias Marie-Claude
- Odette Sansom (1912–1995), SOE
- Jean-Paul Sartre (1905–1980), French philosopher, playwright, novelist, screenwriter, political activist, biographer and literary critic, considered a leading figure in 20th-century French philosophy and Marxism
- Jorge Semprún (1923–2011), Spanish writer, member of FTP and then FTP-MOI, later Culture Minister of Spain
- Ariadna Scriabina (1905–1944), daughter of composer Alexander Scriabin, co-founder of the Armée Juive
- Marcelle Semmer (1895 – c. 1944), recipient of the Croix de Guerre (1915)
- Claude Simon (1913–2005)
- Susana Soca (1906–1959), Uruguayan poet and socialité
- Raymond Sommer (1906–1950, French racing driver
- Suzanne Spaak (1905–1944), sister-in-law of Paul-Henri Spaak
- Roger Stéphane (1919–1994), French journalist
- Hélène Studler (1891–1944), religious sister
- Evelyne Sullerot (1924–2017), historian and sociologist
- Violette Szabo (1921–1945), SOE

== T ==
- François Tanguy-Prigent (1909–1970)
- Paul Tarascon (1882–1977), World War I flying ace
- Drue Leyton (1903–1997), also known as Dorothy Tartière
- Édith Thomas (1909–1979), French historian and journalist
- Germaine Tillion (1907–2008), French anthropologist
- Charles Tillon (1897–1993), member of FTP
- Elsa Triolet (1896–1970), writer, wife of Louis Aragon
- Michael Trotobas, 1914–1943), "Capitaine Michel," agent, Special Operations Executive
- Madeleine Truel (1904–1945)
- Tristan Tzara (1896–1963), French-Romanian poet

== V ==
- Marie-Claude Vaillant-Couturier (1912–1996)
- Rose Valland (1898–1980), French art historian and museum curator of Galerie nationale du Jeu de Paume
- Marina Vega (1923–2011), Spanish spy for French Resistance
- Jean-Pierre Vernant (1914–2007), French philologist and anthropologist
- Berthe Vicogne-Fraser (1894–1956)
- Pierre Villon (1901–1980), member of FTP, one of the three leaders of the Committee of Military action created by the Conseil National de la Résistance
- Jean de Vomécourt (1899–1945)
- Philippe de Vomécourt (1902–1964)
- Pierre de Vomécourt (1906–1986)
- Traian Vuia (1872–1950), Romanian inventor

== W ==
- Nancy Wake (1912–2011), SOE
- Gabrielle Weidner (1914–1945)
- Johan Hendrik Weidner (1912–1994)
- Simone Weil (1909–1943)
- Suzanne Wesse (1914–1942)
- Jean-Pierre Wimille (1908–1949), French racing driver

== Y ==
- Chuck Yeager (1923–2020), American test pilot, one of the Allied pilots shot down over France who made it back to England with the help of the Resistance

== Z ==
- Yvonne Ziegler (1902–1988), French artist, educator
