= Sidney Chouraqui =

French Resistance fighter (1914–2018)

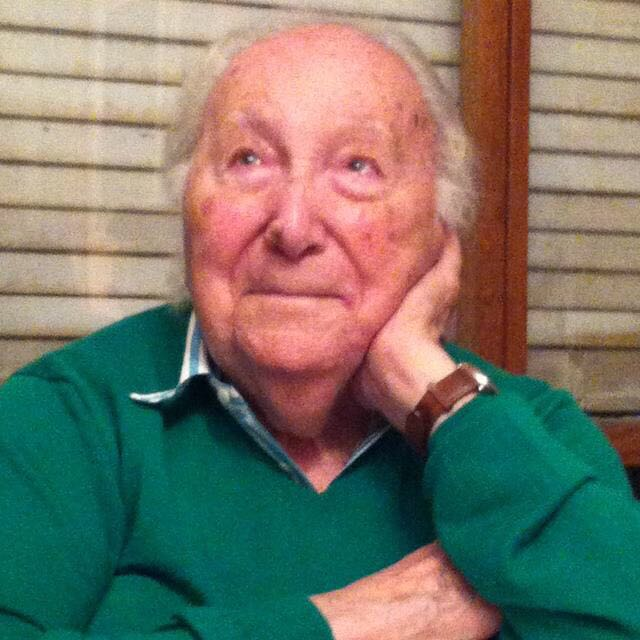
- Chouraqui in 2014
- Born: 13 October 1914; Sidi Bel Abbès, French Algeria
- Died: 3 February 2018 (aged 103); Aix-en-Provence, France
- Children: Alain Chouraqui [fr]
- Military career
- Allegiance: French Third Republic; Free France
- Unit: 2nd Armoured Division
- Conflicts: Second World War; Normandy campaign; Battle of the Falaise pocket; Liberation of Paris; Battle of Alsace; Liberation of Strasbourg; Battle of the Bulge
- Awards: Legion of Honour (Chevalier); Médaille militaire Cross of the Resistance Volunteer Combatant; Free French Forces Medal; Presidential Unit Citation (U.S.); Et al. (Note: Medals from the 2nd Armoured Division, the cities of Aix-en-Provence and Paris (60th anniversary of the liberation), etc.)
- Other work: Cofounder of LICRA and the Camp des Milles Memorial

Sidney Chouraqui was a French Resistance fighter and postwar activist for remembrance and education. During the Second World War, he was an internee at the Bedeau camp and later served in General Philippe Leclerc's 2nd Armoured Division. After the war, he cofounded the International League Against Racism and Anti-Semitism (LICRA) and was one of the main driving forces behind the Camp des Milles Memorial project.

== Early life and education ==
Sidney Isaac Chouraqui was born in Sidi Bel Abbès, French Algeria, on 13 October 1914 to a father who was a grain farmer and miller. His father was mobilised in 1914 and fought in the Oriental Expeditionary Force that was deployed to the Dardanelles in 1915. Chouraqui excelled academically, though he had early and continuous experiences with antisemitism, xenophobia, and racism.

Between 1935 and 1937, he completed his military service in the 9th Zouave Regiment. Chouraqui subsequently settled in Casablanca where he embarked on a legal traineeship.

== Second World War ==
Chouraqui was mobilised in 1939 and stationed in Meknes during the Phoney War. After the June 1940 armistice, he formed a small resistance group in Casablanca and contacted General Charles de Gaulle in London through the brother of Maurice Schumann. Due to the Law on the Status of Jews enacted by the Vichy regime, he was struck off the bar. Unable to practise law, he began selling shoes for an Arab merchant.

In December 1942, and following the Allied landings, Chouraqui sent a letter to the Casablanca recruitment office seeking clarification on the eligibility of Algerian Jews for mobilisation. Chouraqui was subsequently mobilised in the Jewish Pioneer Battalions and interned at the Bedeau camp in January 1943. He assumed a leading role among the Bedeau internees and drafted a Manifesto des Juifs de Bedeau (Manifesto of the Jews of Bedeau) with fellow internee Germain Ayache that articulated their grievances to the French military authorities.

Chouraqui was released on 9 April and travelled on cattle cars with his fellow former internees to reach the Tunisian front, later resorting to hitchiking. In a letter to his parents, he described "his Tunisian campaign" as having become his own "exodus from Egypt, 1943 edition", a satirical reference to the biblical Exodus. Considered deserters, they were fired upon by gendarmes under the command of General Henri Giraud but were nevertheless able to reach Tripolitania where they volunteered in General Philippe Leclerc's Régiment de marche du Tchad.

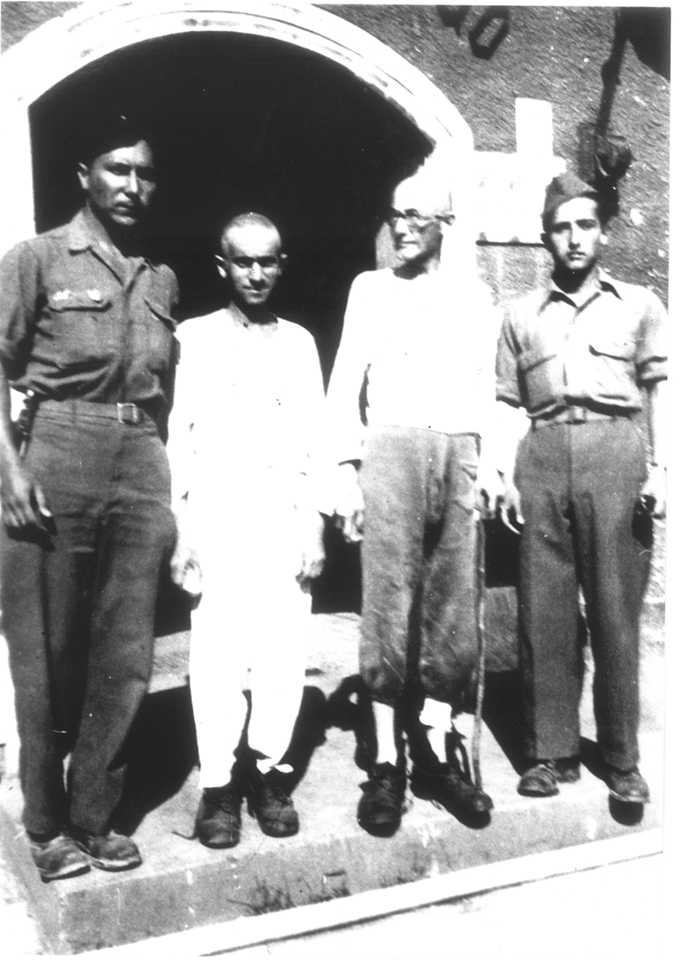
Chouraqui (left) at Landsberg concentration camp

Chouraqui was among a small number of Jews authorised to rejoin the bar under a quota system, though in an April letter he refused unless all Jews were permitted to do so, writing: "There is no justice in injustice!". In November, he participated in the formation of the 2nd Armoured Division under General Leclerc in Morocco and trained in England. He took part in the Normandy Landings in late July 1944 and fought in the subsequent campaign, in particular at the Battle of Alençon. Chouraqui participated in the liberation of Paris on 25 August, remaining with the 2nd Armoured Division for the liberation of Strasbourg, the Battle of the Bulge, and in April 1945 the liberation of Landsberg concentration camp.

On 8 May, at the time of the unconditional German surrender, Chouraqui and the 2nd Armoured Division had just recently occupied the Eagle's Nest and he celebrated by opening a bottle of French champagne stored in Hitler's cellars. In his journal on that day, he wrote of a "bittersweet victory" (victoire en déchantant) and mentioned "A future that will not be bright".

== Post war ==
Chouraqui was demobilised in 1945 and returned to Casablanca where he worked as a lawyer, specialising in international maritime law. Due to pleadings having to be done exclusively in Arabic post-Moroccan independence, he moved to France and joined the Aix-en-Provence bar. Chouraqui was a member of the French Jewish-Christian Friendship Association [fr] from 1967 onwards and was one of the cofounders of the International League Against Racism and Anti-Semitism (LICRA), serving as its honorary president in Aix-en-Provence.

From 1982 onwards, Chouraqui was one of the main initiators of the Camp des Milles Memorial project that sought to preserve the site and make it a place for remembrance and humanist education. The project took thirty years to complete, with the site inaugurated by Prime Minister Jean-Marc Ayrault on 10 September 2012. Alongside a fellow resistance fighter and a deportee, Chouraqui addressed an appeal warning of the "mortal risk" of the far-right on 30 April 2017, a week before the second round of voting in the 2017 French presidential election and on the National Day of Remembrance for the Deportation [fr].

He died on 3 February 2018, at the age of 103.

== Selected works ==
- Chouraqui, Sidney (1997). "Le camp de Juifs français de Bedeau ou Vichy après Vichy" [The French Jewish camp of Bedeau or Vichy after Vichy]. Revue d'Histoire de la Shoah (in French). 161 (3): 217–245. doi:10.3917/rhsho1.161.0218.
- Chouraqui, Sidney; Posset, Anton (2004). "Sur Landsberg-Kaufering, camp satellite de Dachau" [On Landsberg-Kaufering, satellite camp of Dachau]. Revue d'Histoire de la Shoah (in French). 180 (180): 393–401. doi:10.3917/rhsho1.180.0394.
- Chouraqui, Sidney (10 February 2011). ""M. Hessel, vous ne m'apparaissez pas fidèle à l'universalité de nos valeurs"" ["Mr. Hessel, you do not appear to me to be faithful to the universality of our values"]. Le Monde (in French).
- Toros-Mater, Denise; Chouraqui, Sidney; Monguilan, Louis (10 December 2015). "Nous reconnaissons les visages de la haine" [We recognise the faces of hate]. Le Monde (in French).

== See also ==
- List of people involved with the French Resistance
- Antisemitism in France
- The Holocaust in France
- Timeline of deportations of French Jews to death camps

== Bibliography ==
- Bel-Ange, Norbert (2006). Quand Vichy internait ses soldats juifs d'Algérie: Bedeau, sud oranais, 1941–1943 [When Vichy Interned its Jewish Soldiers from Algeria: Bedeau, Southern Oran, 1941–1943] (in French). Paris: L'Harmattan. ISBN 978-2-296-42363-3.
- Catinchi, Philippe-Jean (12 February 2018). "La mort du résistant Sidney Chouraqui" [The death of resistance fighter Sidney Chouraqui]. Le Monde (in French).
- Chouraqui, Alain. Quelques elements biographiques [Some biographical information] (PDF) (Report) (in French). Camp des Milles.
- Slyomovics, Susan (2019). ""Other Places of Confinement": Bedeau Internment Camp for Algerian Jewish Soldiers". In Bourn, Aomar; Abrevaya Stein, Sarah (eds.). The Holocaust and North Africa. Stanford University Press; United States Holocaust Memorial Museum. pp. 95–112, 273–277.
