= Bedeau camp =

Vichy internment camp for Jewish conscripts in Algeria (1941–1943)

Bedeau camp was an internment camp established by Vichy France in April 1941 to hold North African Jewish conscripts that were removed from regular combat units and assigned to work units where they were subjected to forced labour. The camp was situated in the remote commune of Bedeau (today Ras El Ma) in French Algeria.

On arrival, internees were made to hand over their uniforms in exchange for ones that were dyed black, for which they earned the nickname les corbeaux (the crows). Internees were forced to unload munitions and complete tasks such as harvesting esparto grass and breaking rubble. After March 1942, the camp was placed under civilian authority. Internees were subjected to a disciplinary measure known as 'the tomb', which was common in other camps, where individuals would be made to dig a hole and lie in it under the blazing sun for extended periods of time.

Following the Allied landings, General Henri Giraud initially attempted to maintain the exclusion of Jewish conscripts from combat units. The mobilisation class of 1939 was recalled to service, with Jewish conscripts assigned to the work units. As a result, the number of Jews interned at Bedeau swelled from several hundred to likely several thousand. During this period, Sidney Chouraqui and Germain Ayache drafted a Manifesto des Juifs de Bedeau (Manifesto of the Jews of Bedeau) that articulated their grievances to the French military authorities. Following a press campaign in the United States, the Bedeau camp was closed in April 1943 with the work units dissolved by the end of June.

Postwar efforts by Bedeau internees to secure French recognition of their experiences were unsuccessful. In 2003, survivors initiated proceedings with the German Claims Conference and were awarded lifetime compensation, with the camp classified by German researchers as an Arbeitslager.

== Background ==
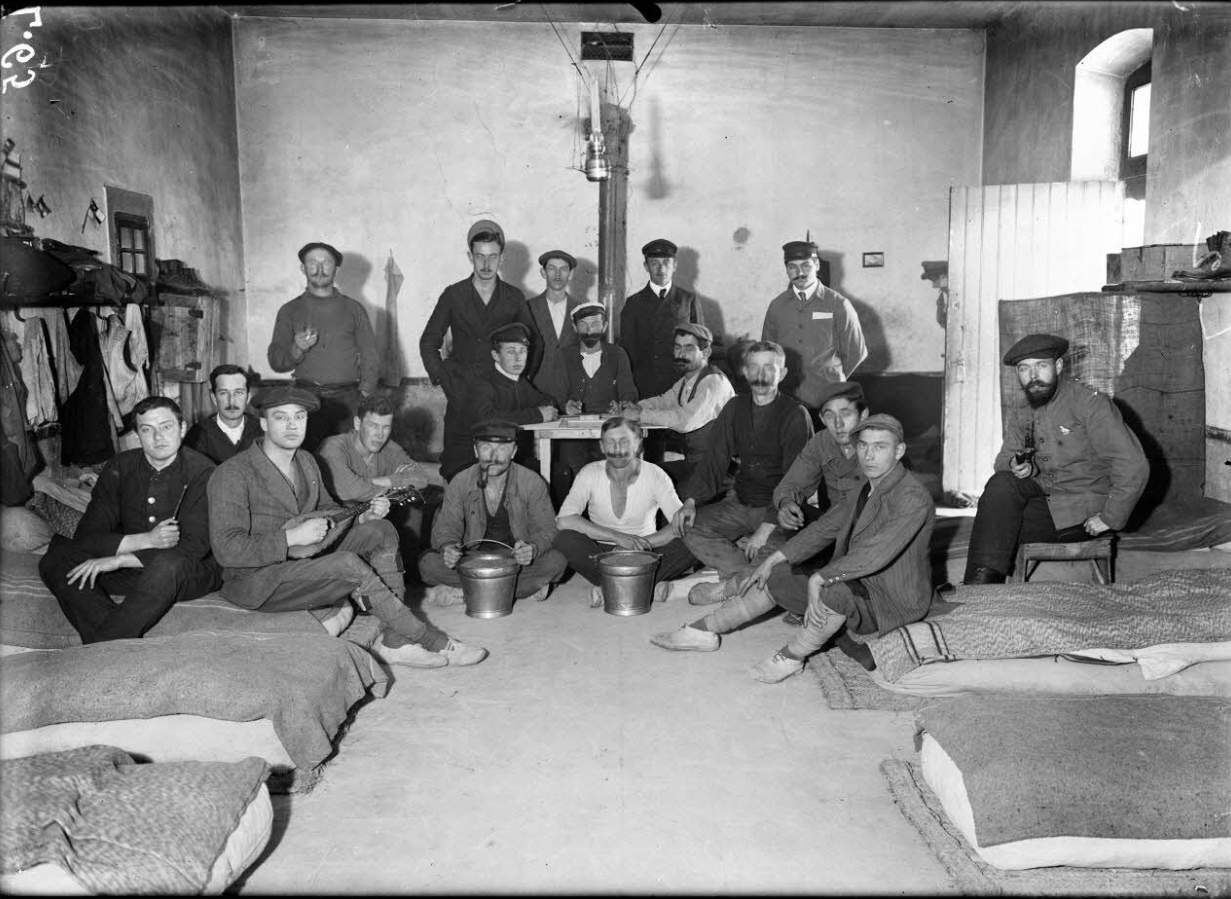
Internees at Bedeau when it housed an internment camp for Austro-German civilians, February 1916

With the outbreak of the Second World War, North African Jewish conscripts were called up for military service in November 1939. Following the fall of France and the establishment of the Vichy regime, the Crémieux Decree that had granted French citizenship to Algerian Jews was effectively repealed on 8 October 1940. On 24 October, the military high command forbade Jews from enlisting as ordinary soldiers while the First Law on the Status of Jews was enacted in French Algeria on 29 October and thereon strictly applied.

In a 28 February 1941 letter to Delegate-General in French Africa Maxime Weygand, General Charles Huntziger (Minister of War and commander-in-chief of the Armistice Army) stated:

the defeat [of May–June 1940] is the fault of the Jewish soldiers... reports on the morale of the troops in North Africa show that the Jews who remained in the units have a harmful influence and that, through their lack of national identity, they undermine the morale of the units

He consequently asked Weygand to have all Jewish soldiers removed from the North African units. Huntziger acknowledged that the ideal solution would be the outright release of Jewish conscripts but explained that this might displease the remaining Algerian soldiers still in service. On 27 March, General Odilon Picquendar [fr] signed the Picquendar circular stipulating that Algerian Jewish soldiers stripped of their French citizenship should be reassigned to work units.

== History ==
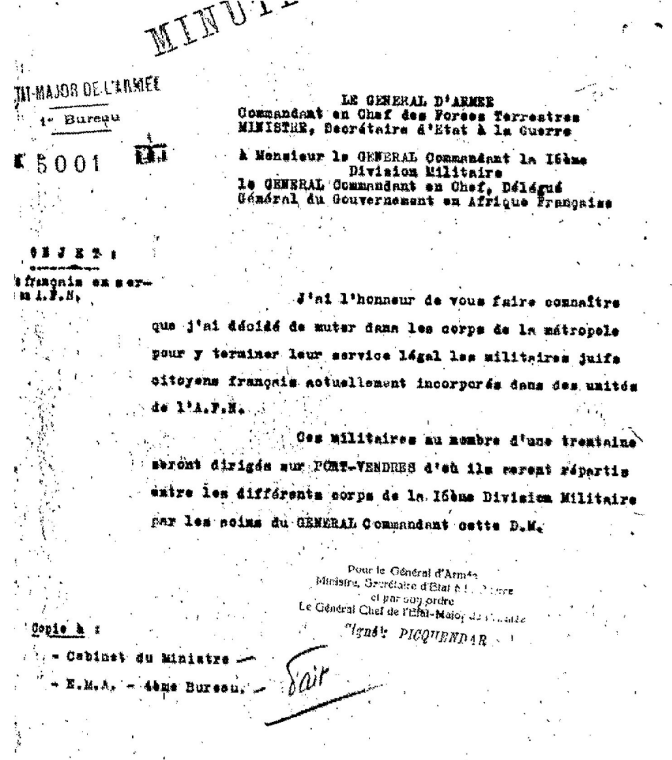
The Picquendar circular

Chief of Staff of the 19th Military Region Lieutenant General Louis Koeltz then formed two Jewish Worker Units (Groupes de Travailleurs Israélites), one in Bedeau composed of Moroccan Jews and most of the Algerian Jews and one in Teleghma composed of Tunisian Jews and the remaining Algerian Jews. The first Jewish soldiers arrived in Bedeau in April 1941. The Bedeau and Teleghma camps initially numbered 180 and 90 Jewish workers respectively, according to Koeltz. A further two camps were later established at Chéraga and El Guerra (near Constantine).

The Bedeau camp was under the command of Colonel Robitaille of the French Foreign Legion, based in Sidi Bel Abbès, and it was administered by Captain Orsini and Commandant Boitel. On arrival, internees were ordered to sign 'demilitarisation' papers and to return their uniforms. They were then told that they were no longer soldiers but remained under the authority of the army. The Jewish internees earned the nickname les corbeaux (the crows) on account of the dyed black uniforms they were given to distinguish them from regular soldiers.

In contrast to the Teleghma camp, Bedeau did not resemble Nazi concentration camps in that there was no barbed wire, watchtowers, or fence of any kind. The camp consisted mostly of tents that could hold up to ten detainees. Nevertheless, internees were poorly equipped to withstand the extreme temperatures and their water source was a single cattle trough. They were also subjected to forced labour which not only involved unloading munitions from trains but also more pointless tasks like harvesting esparto grass, breaking stone into rubble, and digging trenches only to fill them in again. According to historian Norbert Bel-Ange, it is likely that the munitions were being concealed from the armistice commissions as part of Weygand's plan to strengthen the army in North Africa.

After March 1942, the camp was reclassified as a camp for Algerian workers (Groupement des Travailleurs Algériens) and placed under the direct control of the Governor-General of Algeria, instead of the military. When it was placed under civilian authority, the camp guards were members of the Service d'ordre légionnaire. Internees were subjected to a disciplinary action common in other camps, known as the "tomb", where prisoners were made to dig a hole and lie in it under the harsh sun for hours, sometimes days. Between February and August 1942, there were between 165 and 171 Jewish workers at Bedeau.

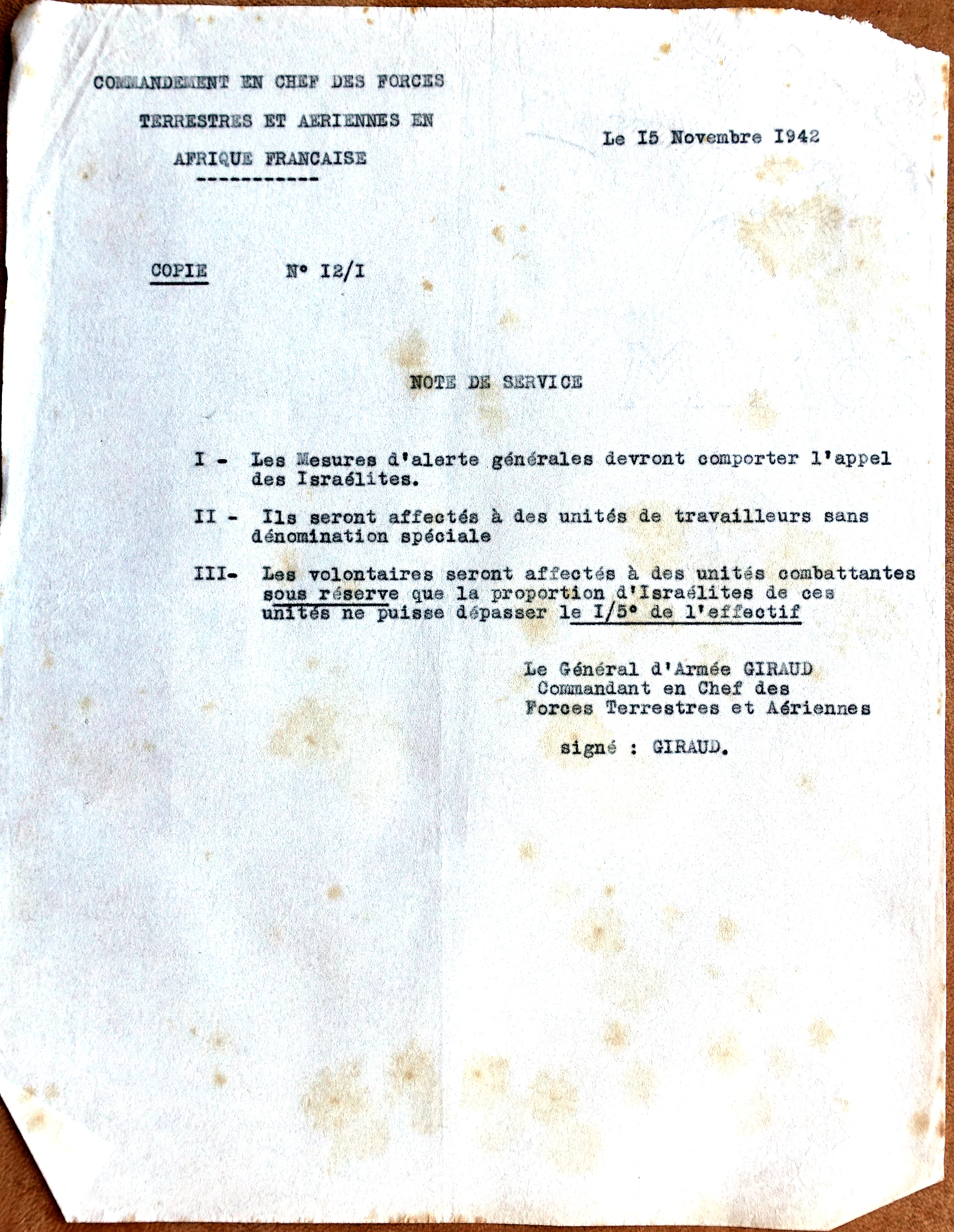
The 15 November memo authored by Giraud that ordered Jewish conscripts to be assigned to work units. (Note: According to this document, Jewish volunteers were to be assigned to combat units as long as the proportion of Jewish soldiers in these units was less than a fifth.)

The mobilisation class of 1939 was released from active service on 2 November with these Jewish internees returning to their homes. Following the Allied landings, Commander-in-Chief of the Army of Africa General Henri Giraud issued a secret memo on 15 November that confirmed the assignment of Jewish soldiers to "work units". Giraud opposed assigning Jews to combat units, not wanting to award them promotions or decorations, nor wanting the children of those killed in action to achieve Pupille de la Nation status.

The Jewish conscripts were remobilised on 27 November whereupon they were assigned to Jewish Pioneer Battalions (Bataillon des Pionniers Israélites) and sent back to Bedeau, which increasingly came to resemble a transit camp. Bel-Ange estimates that several thousand Jewish conscripts were interned at Bedeau between late November 1942 and June 1943. The conscripts were provided with military uniforms and permitted to wear their rank insignia. General René Prioux issued the Prioux circular on 30 January 1943 that clarified Giraud's policies towards Jews in the army.

On several occasions internees appealed to the French High Command expressing their desire to be reinstated into regular French military units, rejecting the proposed option that they volunteer in indigenous infantry units and thus lose their ranks. Internees Sidney Chouraqui and Germain Ayache drafted a Manifesto des Juifs de Bedeau (Manifesto of the Jews of Bedeau) that articulated their grievances to the French military authorities. In a symbolic protest, detainees at Bedeau deposited their indigenous pay in a French fund established during the First World War to aid prisoners-of-wars and civilians during wartime.

=== Press campaign and closure ===
In late 1942, Jewish soldiers interned at Bedeau began writing to pro-democratic organisations in order to draw attention to their situation and later to the Prioux circular. The internees simultaneously wrote to the American administration and American Jewish institutions. Gaullists also worked tirelessly to discredit Giraud among American Jews. A widely disseminated 10 February 1943 joint declaration of the American Jewish Congress and World Jewish Congress read:

And in territories where the flags of the United States and the United Nations fly, Nazi ghettos and concentration camps still exist, along with the rigorous application of the Vichy version of the Nuremberg Laws, which abolished the rights to French citizenship.

In March 1943 Giraud abandoned the Vichy-era decrees, though he refused to reinstate the Crémieux Decree. The Bedeau camp was closed on 15 April and on 28 April he officially ordered the closure of the Algerian internment camps, with the Jewish Pioneer Battalions dissolved between April and June. Prisoners were subsequently sent to camps in Morocco and Tunisia, with almost 750 Jewish prisoners sent to Marrakesh where they joined the 31st Autonomous Group of Ground Anti-Aircraft Forces [fr]. They were later incorporated into regular Free French units and fought in France, Italy, and Germany. The Crémieux Decree was quietly reinstated on 21 October, however informal segregation of Jews in regular units persisted.

== Legacy ==
Beginning in 1958, Jewish veterans and former internees in the camps lobbied the French government in the postwar years for recognition and for their time in internment to be counted towards their military pensions. However, these efforts were met with administrative resistance and were unsuccessful. A bill was prepared in 1992 that would have recognised those interned at Bedeau with the creation of a bespoke status owing to their plight, though it never advanced past the proposal stage.

In 2003, veterans Paul Halimi and Jacques Bénichou initiated proceedings with the German Claims Conference for compensation as forced labourers under the Nazi regime or its collaborators. Their claim was successful and survivors therein received 8,000 euros as a lump sum and lifetime payments of 270 euros per month.

Researchers at the German Foundation Remembrance, Responsibility, and Future classified the Bedeau camp as an Arbeitslager but not compensably as a "concentration camp" under the Federal Compensation Act. In 2007, the French National Assembly refused to designate those held at Bedeau as being eligible for the postwar political internee card (carte d’interné politique) on the basis of the informal nature of the camp.

== Notable internees ==
- Léon Ashkenazi
- Sidney Chouraqui
- Germain Ayache

=== Testimonies ===
- Ashkenazi, Léon (2001). L'Histoire de ma vie [The Story of My Life] (in French). n.p.
- Benhamou, Léon (1994). "Les camps d'Algérie" [The camps of Algeria]. Information Juive (in French) (136): 15.
- Benhamou, Léon (13 August 2007). "Oral history interview with Eli Léon Benhamou". United States Holocaust Museum.
- Benkemoun, Maurice (1994). "Le camp de Bedeau" [The Bedeau camp]. Information Juive (in French) (138): 5.
- Chouraqui, Sidney (1997). "Le camp de Juifs français de Bedeau ou Vichy après Vichy" [The French Jewish camp of Bedeau or Vichy after Vichy]. Revue d'Histoire de la Shoah (in French). 161 (3): 217–245. doi:10.3917/rhsho1.161.0218.
- Golski, Michel (1945). Un Buchenwald français sous le règne du Maréchal [A French Buchenwald under the reign of the Marshal] (in French). Périgueux: Editions Pierre Fanlac.

== See also ==
- Antisemitism in France
- Internment camps in France
- Antisemitic tropes#Cowardice and lack of patriotism
- Vichy anti-Jewish legislation

== Bibliography ==
- Bel-Ange, Norbert (2006). Quand Vichy internait ses soldats juifs d'Algérie: Bedeau, sud oranais, 1941–1943 [When Vichy Interned its Jewish Soldiers from Algeria: Bedeau, Southern Oran, 1941–1943] (in French). Paris: L'Harmattan. ISBN 978-229-642-363-3.
- Bourn, Aomar (2018). "Bedeau". In Megargee, Geoffrey P.; White, Joseph R.; Hecker, Mel (eds.). Encyclopedia of Camps and Ghettos 1933-1945, Volume III: Camps and Ghettos Under European Regimes Aligned with Nazi Germany. Bloomington; Indianapolis: Indiana University Press; United States Holocaust Memorial Museum. pp. 249–250. ISBN 978-0-253-02386-5.
- Slyomovics, Susan (2019). ""Other Places of Confinement": Bedeau Internment Camp for Algerian Jewish Soldiers". In Bourn, Aomar; Abrevaya Stein, Sarah (eds.). The Holocaust and North Africa. Stanford University Press; United States Holocaust Memorial Museum. pp. 95–112, 273–277.
- Streicher, Jean-Claude (2014). Le général Huntziger: l'"Alsacien" du maréchal Pétain [General Huntziger: Marshal Pétain's "Alsatian"] (in French). Colmar: J. Do Bentzinger. ISBN 978-284-960-435-9.
