= LeClezio =

LeClézio
- Gender: masculine
- Language: Old French

Other names
- Variant forms: Le Clézio, Le Clezio, Clézio, Le Cleuziou, Le Clezy

LeClézio is a masculine name derived from Old French words clés meaning "keys". It came about during the medieval period, and was probably linked to the custodians of keys to important buildings or estates. It may also have been the names of gatekeepers or guardians. Other forms of the name include Le Clézio, Clézio, Le Cleuziou, Cleuziou, or Le Clezy.

== Family name ==
- J. M. G. Le Clézio (born 1940), writer
- Odile Le Clezio, Australian actress
- Suzanne Leclézio, Franco-Mauritian nurse and WW II resistance fighter
