= Blangy-le-Château =

- Commune
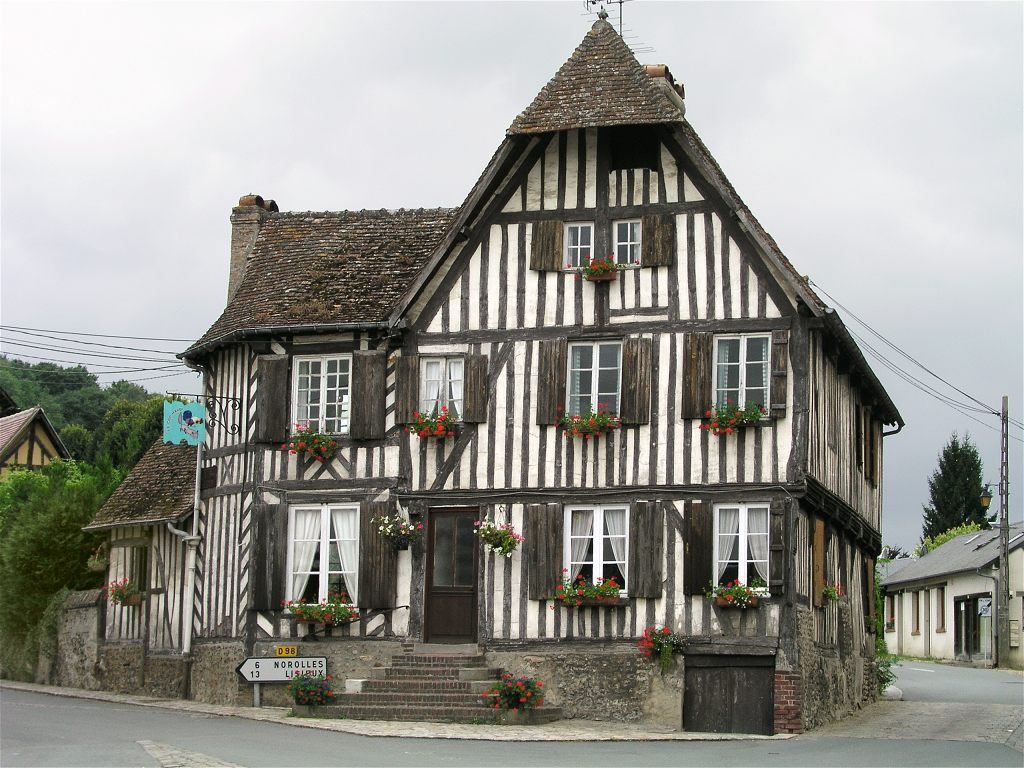
- A timber-framed house in Blangy-le-Château

- Coat of arms
- Location of Blangy-le-Château
- Location within France Location within Normandy
- Coordinates: 49°14′42″N 0°16′28″E
- Country: France
- Region: Normandy
- Department: Calvados
- Arrondissement: Lisieux
- Canton: Pont-l'Évêque
- Intercommunality: CC Terre d'Auge

Government
  - Mayor (2020–2026): Dorian Coge
- Area^{1}: 10.62 km^{2} (4.10 sq mi)
- Elevation: 78 m (256 ft)
- Highest elevation: 162 m (531 ft)
- Lowest elevation: 38 m (125 ft)
- Population (2023): 828
  - Density: 78.0/km^{2} (202/sq mi)
- Time zone: UTC+01:00 (CET)
  - Summer (DST): UTC+02:00 (CEST)
- INSEE/Postal code: 14077 /14130
- ^{1} French Land Register data, which excludes lakes, ponds, glaciers > 1 km^{2} (0.386 sq mi or 247 acres) and river estuaries.

Blangy-le-Château (French pronunciation: [blɑ̃ʒi l(ə) ʃɑto]) is a commune in the Calvados department in the Normandy region in northwestern France.

Notable people that lived here include Suzanne Leclézio, and Yvonne Ziegler.

== Population ==
Historical population
Year	Pop.	±% p.a.
1968	532	—
1975	585	+1.37%
1982	612	+0.65%
1990	618	+0.12%
1999	627	+0.16%
2007	668	+0.79%
2012	690	+0.65%
2017	700	+0.29%
2023	828	+2.84%
Source: INSEE

== See also ==
- Communes of the Calvados department
