= Éclusier-Vaux =

- Commune
- Location of Éclusier-Vaux
- Location within France Location within Hauts-de-France
- Coordinates: 49°56′16″N 2°47′16″E
- Country: France
- Region: Hauts-de-France
- Department: Somme
- Arrondissement: Péronne
- Canton: Albert
- Intercommunality: Pays du Coquelicot

Government
  - Mayor (2020–2026): Laëtitia Dehan
- Area^{1}: 6.34 km^{2} (2.45 sq mi)
- Elevation: 20 m (66 ft)
- Highest elevation: 115 m (377 ft)
- Lowest elevation: 37 m (121 ft)
- Population (2023): 85
  - Density: 13/km^{2} (35/sq mi)
- Time zone: UTC+01:00 (CET)
  - Summer (DST): UTC+02:00 (CEST)
- INSEE/Postal code: 80264 /80340
- ^{1} French Land Register data, which excludes lakes, ponds, glaciers > 1 km^{2} (0.386 sq mi or 247 acres) and river estuaries.

Éclusier-Vaux (Picard: Éclusier-Veux) is a commune in the Somme department in Hauts-de-France in northern France.

== Geography ==
Éclusier-Vaux is situated on the banks of the river Somme and just off the D1 road some 41 km (25 mi) east of Amiens.

== Population ==
Historical population
Year	Pop.	±% p.a.
1968	72	—
1975	59	−2.80%
1982	62	+0.71%
1990	56	−1.26%
1999	69	+2.35%
2007	90	+3.38%
2012	88	−0.45%
2017	81	−1.64%
2023	85	+0.81%
Source: INSEE

== Notable people ==
- Marcelle Semmer (1895–c.1944) who was a decorated French resistance fighter living in Éclusier during World War I. She was awarded the Cross of the Legion of Honor and the Croix de Guerre.

== See also ==
- Communes of the Somme department
