= Yvonne Ziegler =

French resistance fighter, artist (1902–1988)

- Born: Yvonne Henriette Marie Lefeuve; 1 June 1902; Garches, Île-de-France, France
- Died: 16 January 1988 (aged 85); Lisieux, Normandy, France
- Other name: Véronique
- Education: Académie Julian
- Occupations: French resistance fighter, painter, sculptor, engraver, educator
- Partner: Suzanne Leclézio (early 1930s–1987)
- Awards: Croix de Guerre, Resistance Medal

Yvonne Ziegler (née Yvonne Henriette Marie Lefeuve; 1 June 1902 – 16 January 1988) was a French resistance fighter, painter, sculptor, engraver, and educator. She founded and directed the Académie Ziegler in Paris. Ziegler worked in the French resistance with the Cohors-Asturies network and alongside her partner Suzanne Leclézio. They were both deported to Ravensbrück concentration camp, and survived. Ziegler was also known by her French resistance code name, Véronique.

== Early life and education ==
Yvonne Ziegler was born as Yvonne Henriette Marie Lefeuve on 1 June 1902, in Garches in Île-de-France, France.

Ziegler was a student of the Académie Julian in Paris, and had also studied under artists Lucien Simon and Paul Albert Laurens.

== Career ==
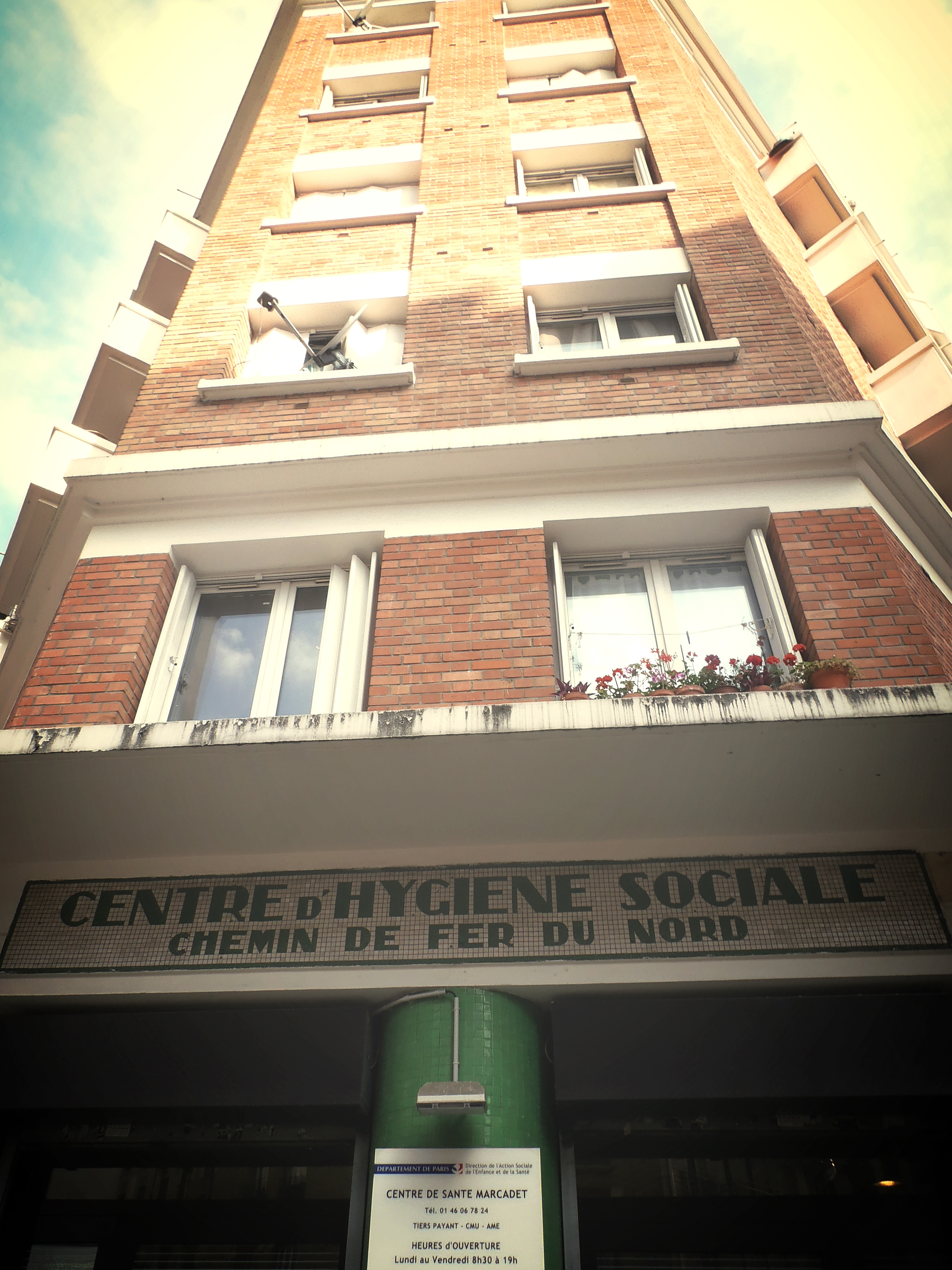
Marcadet Street Health Center (also known as Centre d'hygiène sociale, chemin de fer du Nord) at 22 rue Marcadet

Ziegler was recognized in the 1930s for her artwork, and exhibited in 1937 at the Salon d'Automne in Paris. She was known for her landscape paintings, women's portraits, and nudes. She founded her own academy in Paris, the Académie Ziegler, at 1 rue de la Grande-Chaumière, in the Notre-Dame-des-Champs district.

Starting in the early 1930s her lesbian partner was social worker Suzanne Leclézio, and together they lived in the 14th arrondissement of Paris, at 43 rue Boissonade. Ziegler and Leclézio joined the Cohors-Asturies resistance network together as second lieutenants. Ziegler took the code name "Véronique".

The couple housed resistance fighters in their home, and started a health centre at 22 rue Marcadet, the "Marcadet Street Health Center" (also known as Centre d'hygiène sociale, chemin de fer du Nord) where they saved Jewish families in the 18th arrondissement of Paris.

Ziegler and Leclézio were denounced, and the Gestapo arrested them on 27 July 1944, at their home on Rue Boissonade. They were tortured, then taken to the Fresnes prison and imprisoned, and followed by deportation by the last convoy of political prisoners on 15 August 1944 to the Ravensbrück concentration camp. Ziegler and Leclézio escaped during the death marches, and in May 1945 were liberated by the Red Army.

Upon her return, Leclézio remained the director of the Marcadet Street Health Center until 1984.

Ziegler received the French military decoration Croix de Guerre and the Resistance Medal. Leclézio was named a Chevalier (Knight) of the Legion of Honour, received the Croix de Guerre, and the Resistance Medal.

They retired to Calvados, at La Charretterie, a Normandy farm. They ended their lives in the retirement home of Blangy-le-Château in Normandy, France.

== Death and legacy ==
Leclézio died in 1987, the retirement home; a few months later Ziegler died on 16 January 1988, in Lisieux.

The history of Leclézio and Ziegler was lost for many years, and in more recent times it has been documented by French history researcher Laurent Thévenet.

In 2022, a tribute plaque was placed at 22 rue Marcadet, honoring both women and their work. The text on this plaque was deliberated on by the Paris Council, and was the first time the word "lesbian" was used on a public plaque in France.

A small park in Paris is named "Square du 21-avril-1944", in reference to the date of a nearby bombing that occurred in the 18th arrondissement of Paris, leaving 500 death, and many of the wounded had been treated at the Marcadet Street Health Center.

== Exhibitions ==
- 1935, Les Femmes Artistes Modernes, Society of Modern Women Artists group exhibition, 18 rue Erlanger, Paris, France
- 1935, Exposition de peintures, sculptures, arts décoratifs, Society of Modern Women Artists group exhibition, Bernheim-Jeune gallery, Paris, France
- 1937, Salon d'Automne, group exhibition, Paris, France
- 1937, Exhibition of Paintings, French Landscapes, and Portraits by Yvonne Ziegler, solo exhibition, 27 King Street, Palser Gallery, London, England
