= Saint Pierre, Mauritius =

Village in Mauritius

Coordinates: 20°13′00″S 57°31′00″E

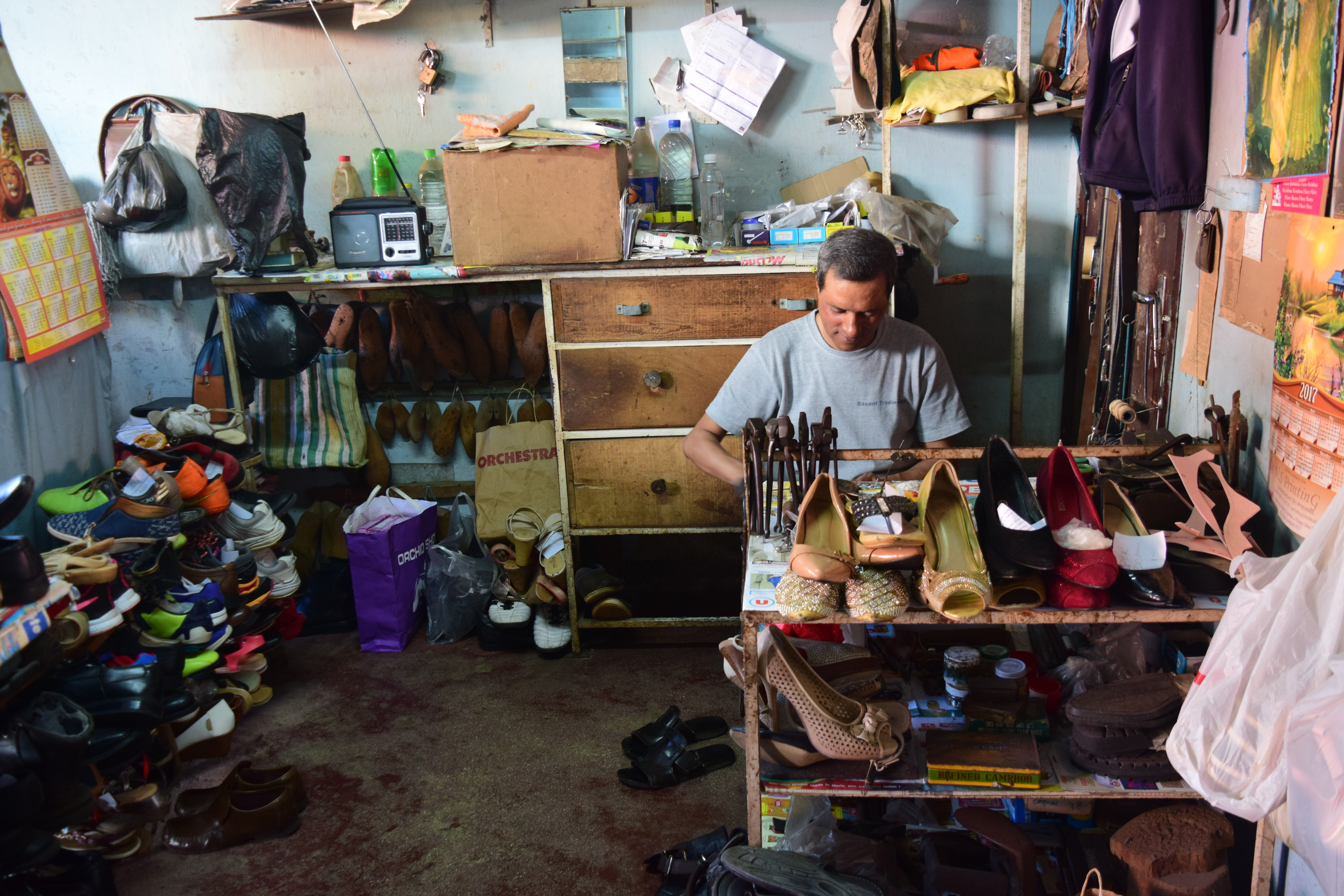
Cobbler at work in Saint Pierre

Saint Pierre is a village in the district of Moka in Mauritius. It is considered to be found in the heart of Mauritius.The climatic conditions is cold and ideal especially during summer with cold breeze.

The village has significantly changed over the years with a new shopping centre, namely Kendra, gyms, driving more traffic to the village. With a growing population, Saint-Pierre is gradually starting to look like a town. The bus station is situated within walking distance to the market, the Kendra shopping centre, the mosque, but a bit further from the local primary and secondary schools, which will require travellers to stop further or to get on another connecting bus.

Saint Pierre has three banks, a market, numerous shops, a primary and a secondary school, a church, a mosque, two petrol stations, a couple of gyms a big shopping centre and much more.

== Transport ==
It had a railway station until this was closed down in the 1960s.

== Education ==
Primary School:

- Saint Pierre Roman Catholic School
- Petit Verger Govt. School

Secondary Schools:

- Loreto College Saint-Pierre
- Nelson College

French international schools:

- Lycée des Mascareignes - Senior high/Sixth form
- École du Centre/Collège Pierre-Poivre - Primary and junior high school

== See also ==
- Railway stations in Mauritius
- Suzanne Leclézio
