= Georges Bensoussan =

French historian (born 1952)

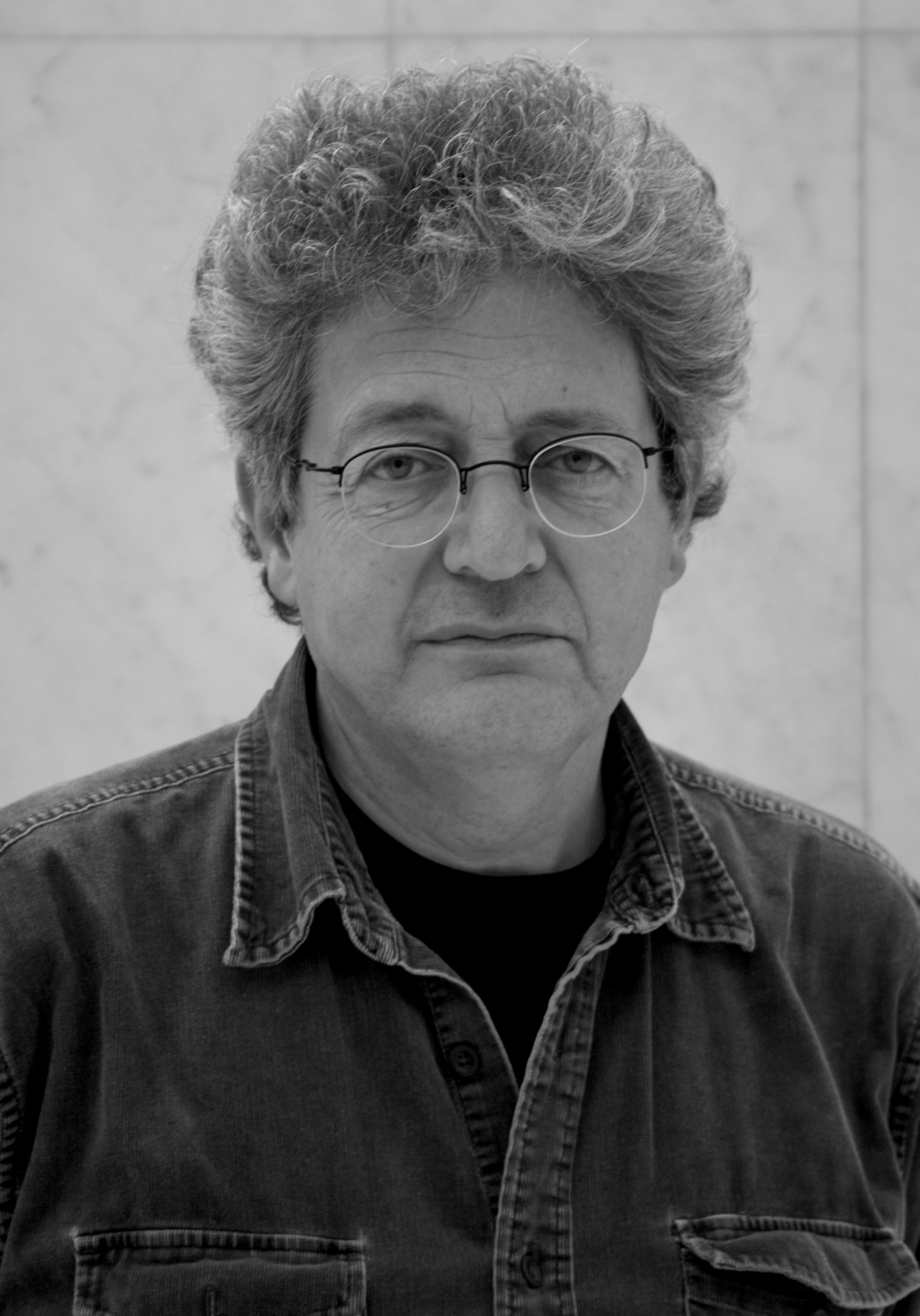
- Born: 17 February 1952 (age 74); Ahfir, French Morocco
- Occupation: Historian

Georges Bensoussan (born 17 February 1952) is a French historian. Bensoussan was born in Morocco. He is the editor of the Revue d'histoire de la Shoah ("Shoah History Review"). He won the Memory of the Shoah Prize from the Jacob Buchman Foundation in 2008.

His Jews in Arab Countries: The Great Uprooting (originally published in French in 2012 as Juifs en pays arabes), published in translation in 2019, is considered a definitive history of Jewish communities in the Arab world.

On October 10, 2015, while on a radio program, he paraphrased Smaïn Laacher, a Muslim, Algerian professor of sociology at the Université de Strasbourg, by saying: "in French Arab families, babies suckle anti-Semitism with their mother’s milk;" in fact, in a lengthy discussion of Muslim antisemitism, Laacher had used the phrase: "It is like in the air we breathe". In response to these remarks, the Collective Against Islamophobia in France and the International League Against Racism and Antisemitism initiated criminal proceedings against him for allegedly inciting racial hatred. In January 2017, he was acquitted of these charges, a verdict that was upheld on appeal in March 2018 and in September 2019 by the Court of Cassation.

== Works ==
- Génocide pour mémoire. Des racines du désastre aux questions d'aujourd'hui, Paris, Le Félin, 1989.
- L'Idéologie du rejet. Enquête sur « Le monument Henry » ou archéologie du fantasme antisémite dans la France de la fin du xix^{e} siècle, Éd. Manya, 1993, coll. « Document ».
- Mémoires juives, (collectif), (Gallimard, 1994)
- Histoire de la Shoah, Paris, Presses universitaires de France, 1996, coll. « Que sais-je ? »; 2^{e} édition revue et corrigée, 1997; 3^{e} édition refondue 2006; 4^{e} édition, 2010, 5^{e} édition mise à jour, 7^{e} édition, 2020, 2012 (traduction espagnole, italienne, japonaise).
- Avec Anne Baron (et al.), L'Aubrac, éd. M. Houdiard, « Guide historique et littéraire », Paris, 1998.
- Une histoire intellectuelle et politique du sionisme: 1860-1940, Fayard, 2002
- Auschwitz en héritage? D'un bon usage de la mémoire, Paris, Mille et Une Nuits, 1998; nouvelle édition augmentée, Paris, Mille et Une Nuits/Fayard, 2003 (traduction espagnole et italienne).
- Du fond de l'abîme. Journal du ghetto de Varsovie, avec Hillel Seidman, Nathan Weinstock, (Pocket, 2002)
- Les Territoires perdus de la République : antisémitisme, racisme et sexisme en milieu scolaire, Paris, Mille et Une Nuits, 2002 (3^{e} édition augmentée, Paris : Pluriel, 2015).
- Ailleurs, hier, autrement : connaissance et reconnaissance du génocide des Arméniens, co-dirigé avec Claire Mouradian et Yves Ternon, (Centre de documentation juive contemporaine, 2003)
- France, prends garde de perdre ton âme…, Paris, Mille et Une Nuits, 2004.
- Une histoire intellectuelle et politique du sionisme (1860-1940), Paris, Fayard, 2002; nouvelle édition revue et augmentée, 2003 (traduit en italien).
- Les Archives clandestines du ghetto de Varsovie, Emmanuel Ringelblum et le Collectif Oyneg Shabbes (Exposition : Mémorial de la Shoah, Paris, 2006-2007), Mémorial de la Shoah, 2006.
- Europe, une passion génocidaire. Essai d'histoire culturelle, Paris, Mille et Une Nuits, 2006.
- Histoire, mémoire et commémoration. Vers une religion civile, dans Le Débat, novembre-décembre 1994, p. 90-97.
- Un nom impérissable. Israël, le sionisme et la destruction des Juifs d'Europe (1933-2007), Paris, Le Seuil, 2008.
- Juifs en pays arabes : le grand déracinement 1850-1975, Paris, Tallandier, 2012; Translated into English as: Jews in arab countries: The great uprooting. Trans. A. Halper. Bloomington, Indiana, Indiana University Press, 2019.
- Atlas de la Shoah : la mise à mort des Juifs d'Europe, 1939-1945, Paris, Éditions Autrement, 2014.
- Dictionnaire de la Shoah, co-dirigé avec Jean-Marc Dreyfus, Edouard Husson, Joël Kotek, Larousse, 2015
- L'Histoire confisquée de la destruction des Juifs d'Europe, Paris, Presses universitaires de France, 2016.
- Une France soumise - Les voix du refus, sous la dir. de Georges Bensoussan, préface d'Elisabeth Badinter, Éd. Albin Michel, 2017.
- Les Juifs du monde arabe. La question interdite, Odile Jacob, 2017.
- L'Alliance israélite universelle (1860-2020), Juifs d'Orient, Lumières d'Occident, Albin Michel, 2020.
- Un Exil français. Un historien face à la justice, préface de Jacques Julliard, L'Artilleur, 2021.
- Les Origines du conflit israélo-arabe (1870-1950), Paris, PUF, 2023, coll. Que sais-je ?.
