= Marie-Louise Charpentier =

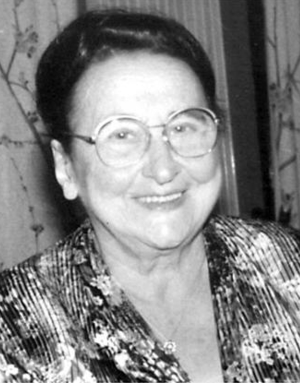
- Born: 26 November 1905; Rennes, France
- Died: 24 June 1998 (aged 92); Rennes, France
- Other names: Lily Charpentier
- Children: 3 adopted children including son Xavier-Vincent Decq-Charpentier
- Awards: Righteous Among the Nations

Marie-Louise Charpentier, also known as Lily Charpentier (1905-1998), was a nurse, social worker, and active member of the French Resistance in Brittany during World War II. Her most well known accomplishment was hiding a Jewish woman and her two grandchildren from German forces and arranging their safe passage to relatives in the south of France. For this, in 1990, she was recognized as "Righteous Among the Nations" by the Yad Vashem Institute in Israel.

== Resistance activist ==
At the risk of her life, Charpentier worked with the Resistance in German-occupied Rennes. Her activities were known to include: distributing leaflets with the help of Dr. Menon who died in the Allied bombardment of May 1943; saving a young Polish couple from deportation; and helping young people escape compulsory labor service in by administering drugs to them just before their evaluation by German doctors.

=== Rescue ===
In 1943, while serving as a social worker in the Rennes office for assistance to families of prisoners of war, she received a visit from an elderly woman, Malka Engelstein, who tearfully told the story about her Jewish family, originally from Poland, who had settled in Metz in eastern France in the early 20th century. Early in World War II, her son Joseph Engelstein, who had been serving in the French army, was captured by German forces and was a prisoner of war. When Germany annexed France in 1940, the remaining family members (Mrs. Malka Engelstein, her husband Fishel, their daughter-in-law, and her two young children) fled Metz and took refuge in Rennes, western France.

However, on this day in 1943, Gestapo agents appeared at their house, ransacked everything and took away the grandfather Fishel as well as her daughter-in-law, and threatened to return for the grandmother and her grandchildren. Charpentier immediately left with the grandmother to find the two young children: Catherine Engelstein, three years old, and her two-year-old brother Raymond and promptly removed them from the house. (She learned later that the Gestapo agents had returned, in vain, to take the three remaining family members.)

Charpentier took the three Jews to a friend's farm about fifteen kilometers from Rennes. The farmer agreed to temporarily house them, but only on the condition that Charpentier take full responsibility for their needs. The three refugees lived on the farm for about a month and every day, Charpentier's brother brought them food with the help of two friends.

Looking for a more lasting and safer solution, Charpentier decided to send them to others active in the Resistance in Paris, and organized their departure, with the help of Archbishop Clément Roques. Mrs. Engelstein did not speak French and was unable to pose as a French citizen so she assumed the role of a deaf woman accompanied by the two children. The group was escorted by two young people who wanted to join the forces of General de Gaulle in North Africa. As their journey proceeded, Charpentier impatiently waited for the arrival of the telegram with the agreed code signaling trip completion; it finally came, "the five rabbits have arrived." Once safe in Paris, members of the clandestine network safely transferred the three Jews to Mrs. Engelstein's relatives in the south of France.

=== Reunion ===
Mrs. Engelstein and the children survived their ordeals, but Grandfather Fishel Engelstein died on the train to Auschwitz.

The daughter-in-law, who had been captured by the Germans, survived the Bergen-Belsen concentration camp in northern Germany and returned to France at the end of the war, but she was reportedly "physically and morally broken." She had the joy of finding her husband and children alive, and even went to see Charpentier to thank her for saving her little ones. However, she never recovered from the horrors she suffered during the war and died five years later.

In 1989, Marie-Louise Charpentier experienced "the great joy of meeting Catherine,” the grown woman nearing 60 who had once been the three-year-old girl she had helped save.

== Award ==
In 1990, Charpentier was given the title of "Righteous among the Nations" by the Yad Vashem organization in Israel, which created the award to "recognize non-Jews who, at personal risk and without a financial or evangelistic motive, chose to save Jews from the ongoing genocide during the Holocaust." She was the first person in Ille-et-Vilaine, France to receive this title. The award includes the inscription, "Whoever saves a life saves the entire universe.” Her name appears on the Yad Vashem Wall of the Righteous in Jerusalem.

== Personal life ==
Marie-Louise Charpentier was the youngest in a family of nine children living in Rennes, France, born on 26 November 1905. She received her diploma in nursing before becoming a social worker.

Charpentier adopted three children. Retelling the story of his adoptive mother, her son Xavier-Vincent Decq-Charpentier, 56 years old, recalled in a 2003 interview that she "had asked nothing." He went on to quote a text written by Lily, "our commitment was so obvious due to our rebelliousness against injustice and also because of our patriotism, that it never occurred to any of us that our actions were worth talking about, each success bringing its sufficient reward in itself."

She died in Rennes on 24 June 1998 at 93.
