= Clignancourt porcelain =

Type of French hard-paste porcelain

Coordinates: 48°53′28″N 2°20′37″E

Clignancourt porcelain, also "Porcelaine de Monsieur" or Manufacture de Monsieur, was a type of French hard-paste porcelain, bought or established by the architect Pierre Deruelle in 1767.

The factory remains at what was then Rue de Clignancourt, Montmartre, Paris; it may have already been in production at that point. In January 1775 it was placed under the protection of Monsieur, the King's brother, and future Louis XVIII.

The porcelain was then called Porcelaine de Monsieur. The factory was transferred to Deruelle's son-in-law in 1790, and production had presumably ceased by the time the building was sold in 1791.

The wares were very high quality, and often similar to those of Sèvres porcelain. The Metropolitan Museum of Art has a very rare round plaque inset as a table top, painted with flowers. The mark was originally a windmill (a symbol of Montmartre), replaced in 1775 by the Prince's initials of "LSX".

== Gallery ==
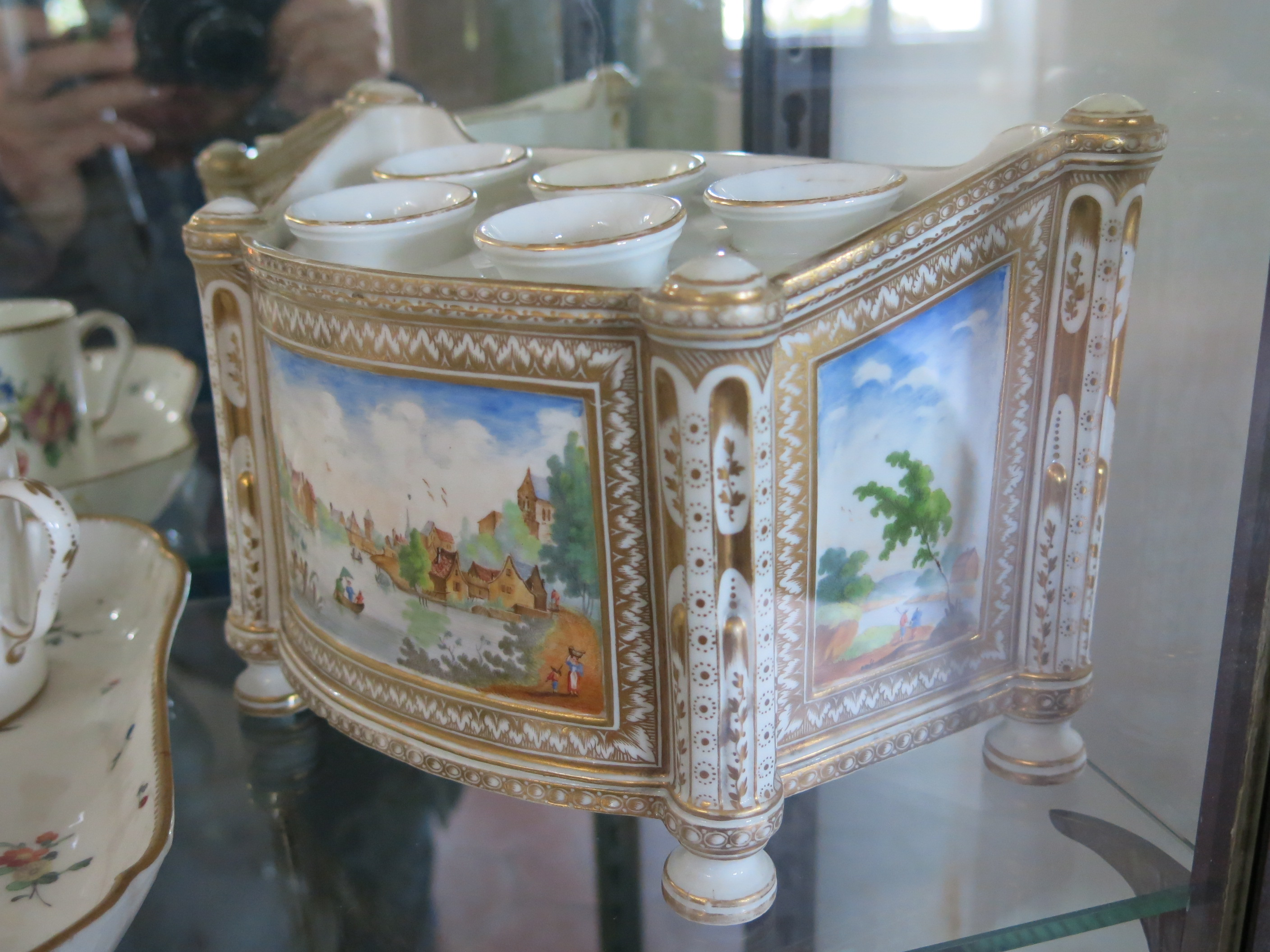
Flower vase

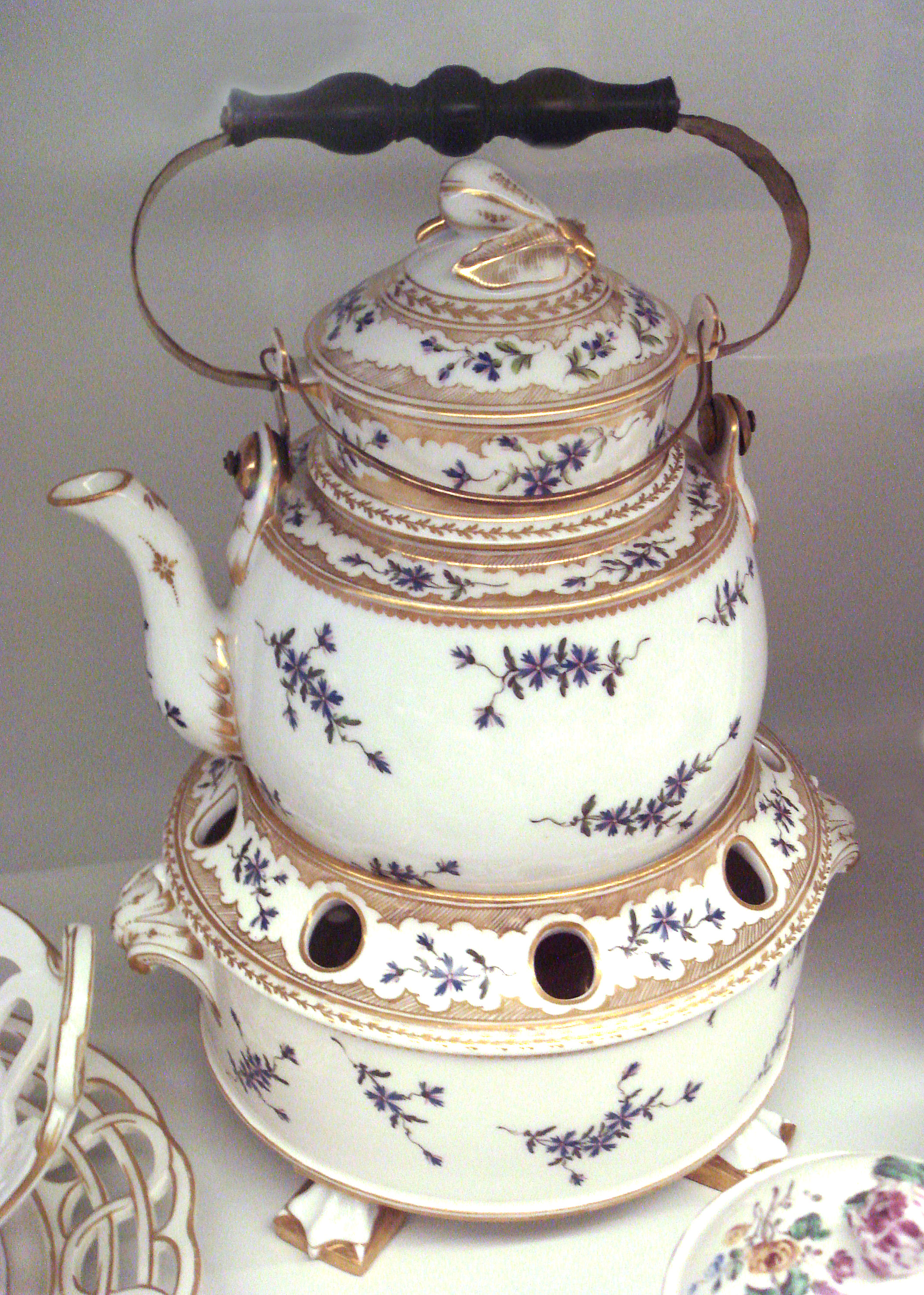
Boiler, hard-paste porcelain, Manufacture de Monsieur, 1780.

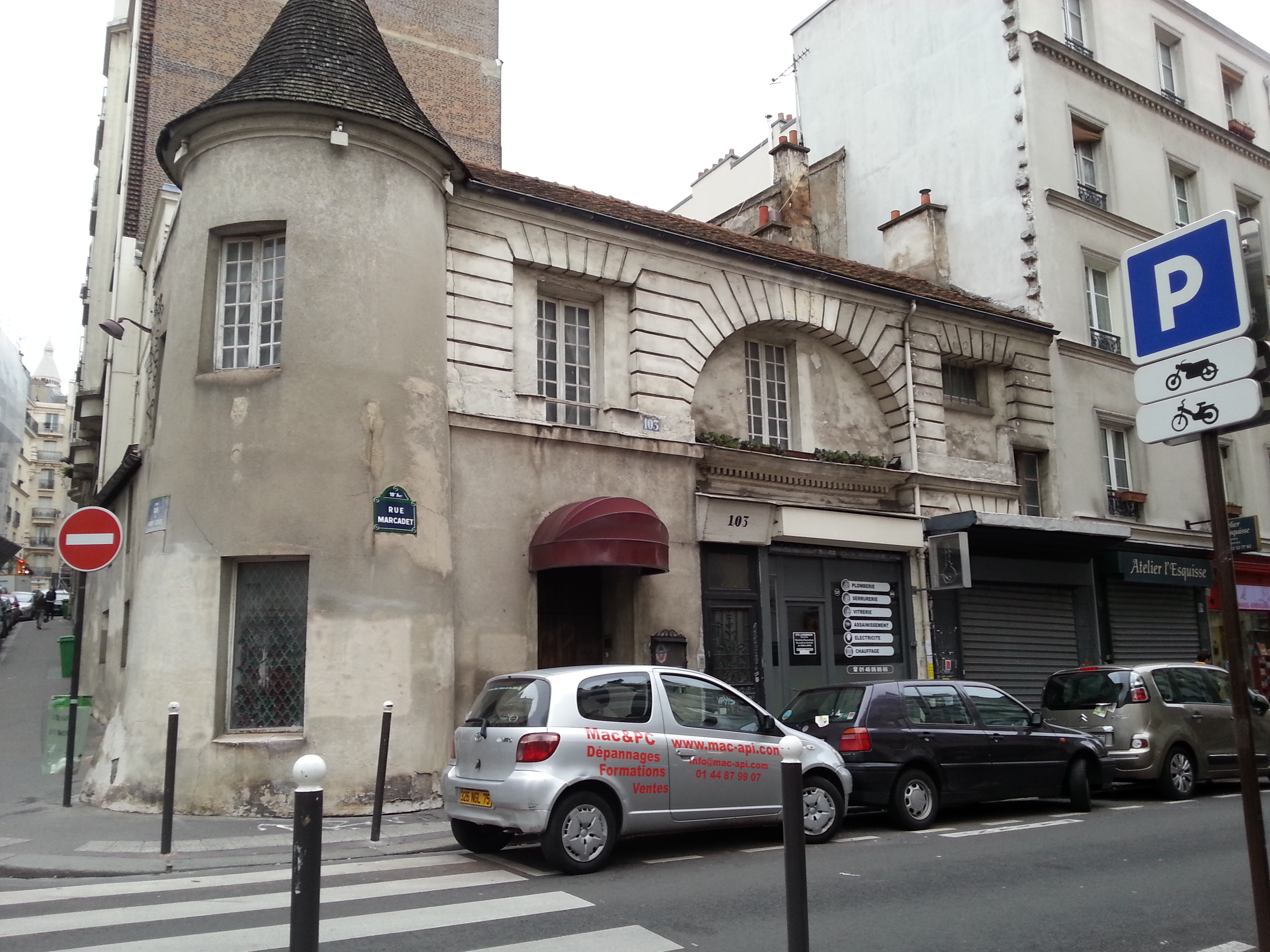
The factory, rue du Mont-Cenis (61, 63), rue Marcadet (103), Paris 18
