= Berthe Fraser =

French Resistance agent (1894-1956)

Berthe Fraser GM (née Vicogne; 1894–1956) was a French Resistance agent who fought the Germans and helped more than 100 allied airmen escape during the Second World War. She spent two years of the war in prison, in one case being tortured for 28 days. She was awaiting execution by the Gestapo in September 1944 but was saved by Allied soldiers who drove away her captors.

As a result of her actions and "acts of great bravery", she was awarded medals from France, the United Kingdom, and the United States.

Fraser married a British soldier in 1919 after he served in the First World War. They settled in Arras, France.

== Second World War ==
The start of the war saw Fraser running a perfume shop in Arras. She and her husband stayed in France when the Germans invaded in May 1940. Since he was British, he was interned soon after the invasion.

Fraser soon created her own underground network to smuggle out British and other allied airmen who had been shot down. The Special Operations Executive, otherwise known as the SOE, was the British organisation that was tasked to conduct espionage, sabotage and reconnaissance in occupied Europe. With the success of her network, Fraser was approached by SOE agents for help. Continuing her role in smuggling airmen to safety, she also helped agents move about in Northern France. In addition, she stored explosives and weapons for the resistance, helped provide intelligence on German positions and movements, and carried messages. She was noted for doing any task that was asked of her.

She was arrested in 1941 and sent to prison in Belgium. During her interrogation, she started providing misleading information that seemed true enough that the Gestapo had to check out the details. In December 1942, after 15 months, she was released as she was considered a "burden on resources". She quickly resumed her previous activities.

She helped F. F. E. Yeo-Thomas, celebrated agent of the SOE, escape by hiding him in a hearse during a mock funeral to evade detection. Flowers around the coffin covered Yeo-Thomas as he was taken to an empty field that was large enough to land a plane to pick him up. The local undertaker provided flowers and steaks to add to the illusion that a funeral was happening. Armed farmers and resistance fighters, their protection arranged by Fraser, guarded the field. Before Yeo-Thomas left, he was provided with wine, cheese, and other products they feared were not available in Britain. The resistance, in return, asked for weapons, and other items that they could use for their operations. Yeo-Thomas was carrying details of the V1 and V2 rocket program with him.

Fraser was captured again in February 1944, after being betrayed by a British agent. She was tortured for 28 days and locked in solitary confinement for six months. The Gestapo wanted her to provide details about her activities and other members of the resistance. By May 1944 she had been sentenced to be executed, but was saved by Allied soldiers who freed her from the prison.

== After the war ==
Fraser was awarded seven medals from several allied countries after the war. In 1990, the Imperial War Museum purchased her medals for $28,500.

Fraser died in 1956. She never fully recovered from her month-long torture.

== Medals ==
- Medal of Freedom — United States
- Legion d'Honneur — France
- George Medal — United Kingdom
