= Rue Marcadet =

Street in Paris, France

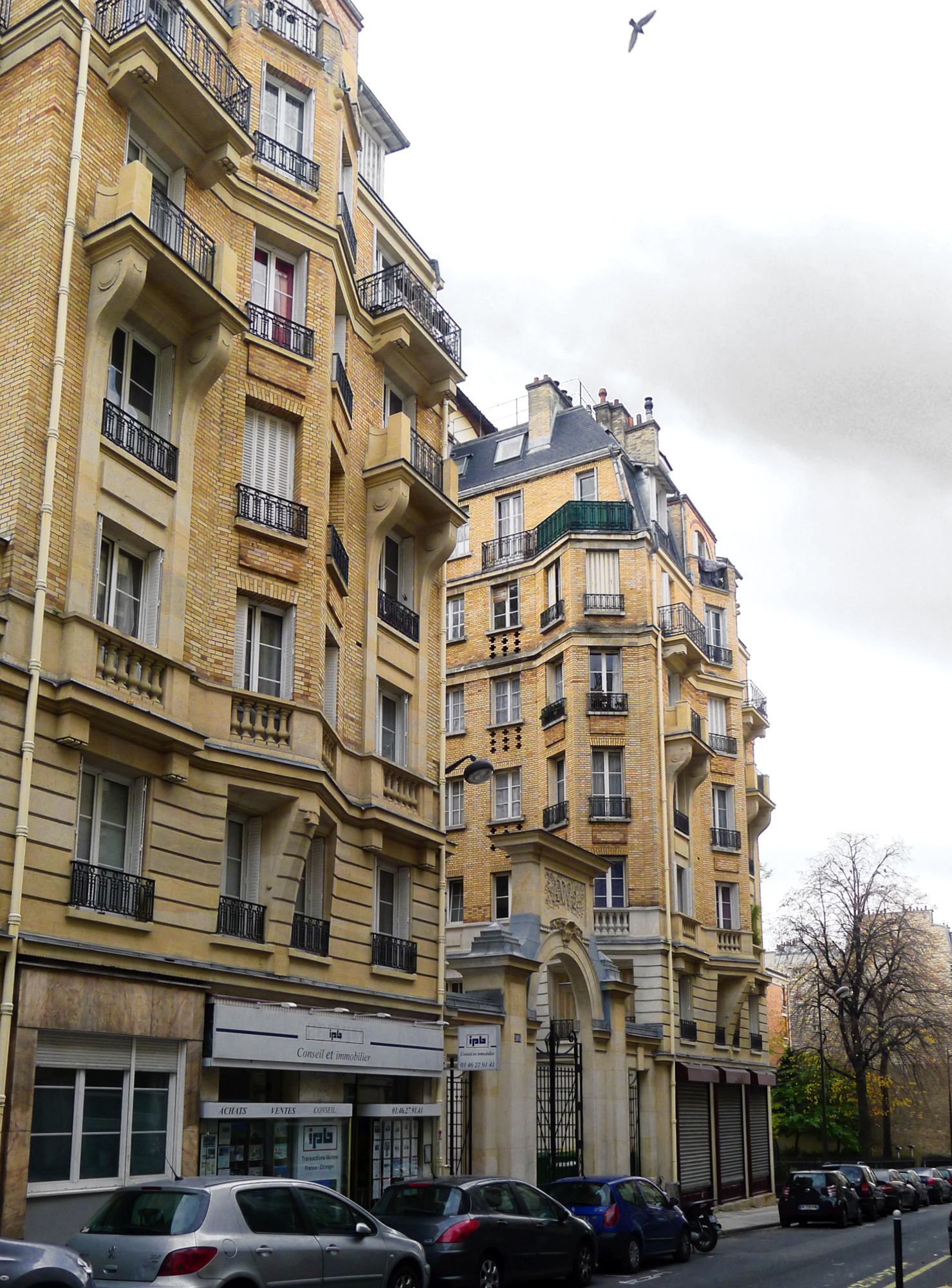
- View of 205 Rue Marcadet

- Location within Paris
- Length: 2,030 m (6,660 ft)
- Width: 12 m (39 ft)
- Arrondissement: 18th
- Quarter: Goutte d'Or, Montmartre
- Coordinates: 48°53′30″N 2°20′7″E
- From: 61 Rue Stephenson and 1 Rue Ordener
- To: 86 Avenue de St. Ouen and 233 Rue Championnet

Construction
- Completion: Mediaeval
- Denomination: 22 September 1856

The Rue Marcadet is a road that stretches the north side of the Butte Montmartre in Paris, France. It is located in the 18th arrondissement.

== History ==
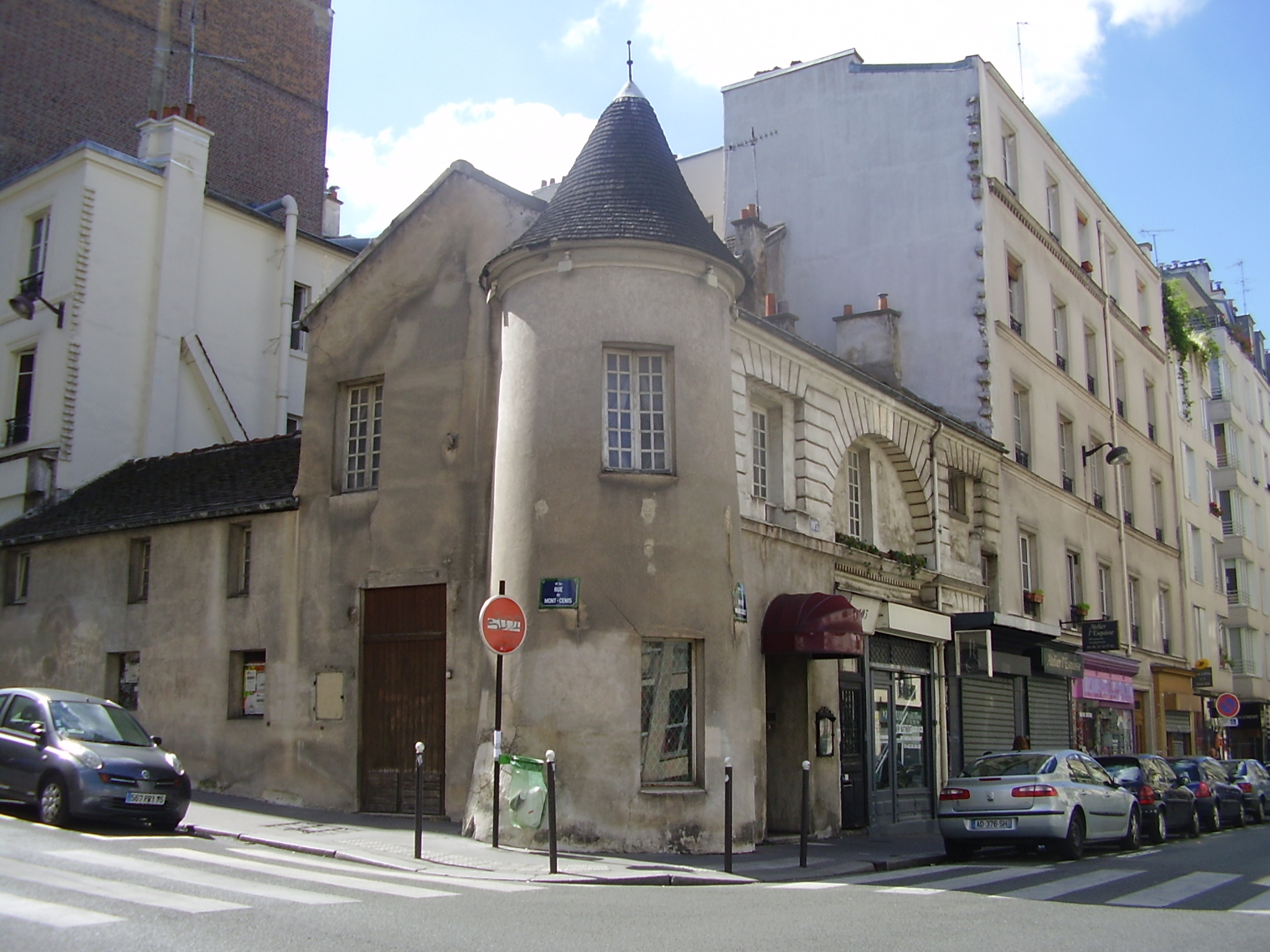
Factory of Clignancourt porcelain at the Rue Marcadet

There is some discussion on the origin of the name, but it seems to be derived from a hamlet on the way named La Mercade or La Marcadé. In the Middle Ages, it was part of the Chemin des Bœufs, which went all the way to Clichy. The last part used to be the main road between the communities of the Batignolles and Montmartre. The Chemin des Bœufs is partially shown on the map created by Jouvin de Rochefort (1672) and shown in its entirety on the map by Roussel (1730).

Before 1867, the Rue Marcadet began at the Rue de la Chapelle, where it also connected to the Rue Riquet. This part now is part of the Rue Ordener, although the bridge over the tracks of the Gare du Nord is still known as the Pont Marcadet. In the beginning of the 20th century, there was also a train stop by that name, that mainly served the (still existing) railway works to the right of that bridge. The continuation of the road between the Avenue de Saint-Ouen and the Boulevard Bessières, now known as the Rue de La Jonquière, also carried the name Rue Marcadet between 1868 and 1890.

== Access ==
The street is served by Métro stations Marcadet – Poissonniers (Line 4 and Line 12) and Guy Môquet (Line 13).
