= Marcelle Semmer =

French Resistance fighter

- Born: 1893; Liévin
- Died: 1964 (aged 70–71); Saint-Sulpice de Favières
- Occupation: Resistance fighter

Marcelle Semmer (1895–c.1944) was a decorated French resistance fighter in World War I. She was awarded the Cross of the Legion of Honor and the Croix de Guerre for her bravery.

== Biography ==
Semmer was the daughter of a phosphate factory owner. When he died in August 1911, six years after his wife, Marcelle was orphaned but she continued to live in the small French village of Éclusier, working as a bookkeeper and clerk in the factory.

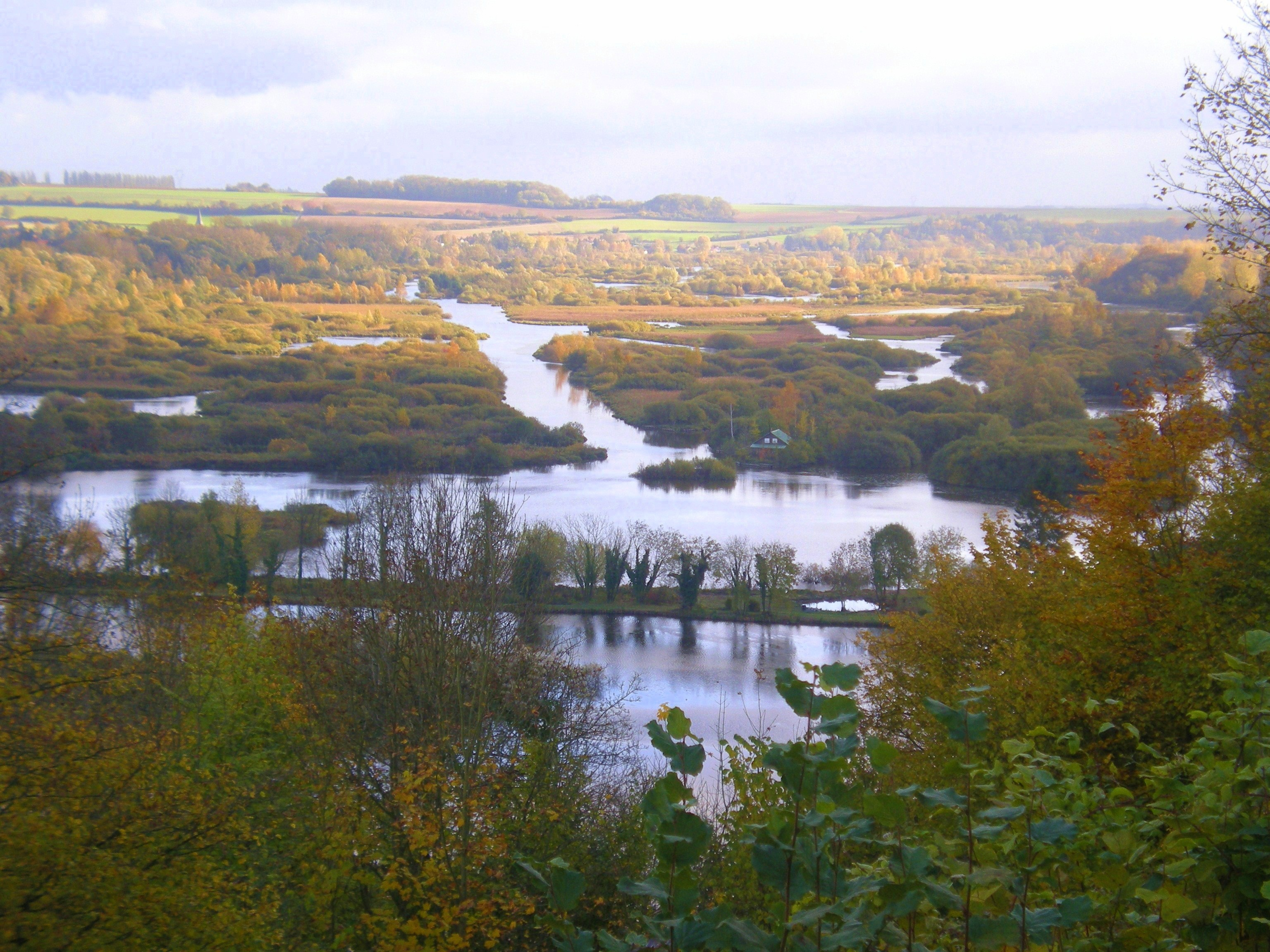
View from Éclusier-Vaux of the Somme River.

By August 1914, the start of World War I, she was about 21 years old. Although most villagers had evacuated to safety as enemy troops approached, Semmer decided to remain there to care for the injured or elderly, including a 90-year-old neighbor.

=== Drawbridge intervention ===
After French forces were defeated at Charleroi, they retreated and tried to make a defensive stand near the banks of the Somme River, but they were soon overwhelmed by invading German troops. The French retreated across a deep canal near Semmer's home in Éclusier with the enemy in close pursuit. As the last friendly soldiers made the crossing, she rushed forward alone and raised the drawbridge, and then she threw the master key into the canal, without which the drawbridge could not be lowered. Stymied, the invaders fired on the girl from the opposite riverbank but missed her and the Germans were unable to cross the canal for many hours, giving the French forces time to regroup and allowing Semmer the opportunity to retreat to her home.

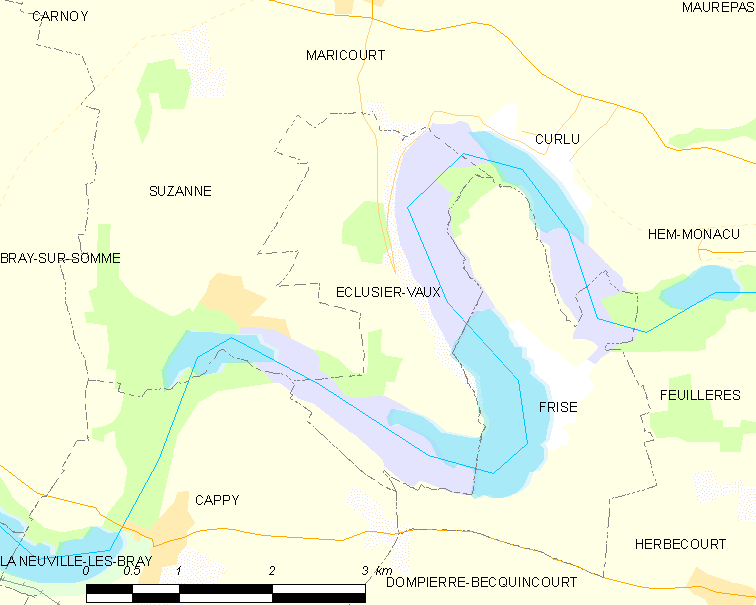
Path of the Somme River at the hamlets of Éclusier-Vaux.

By the next morning, the Germans had gathered enough boats to construct a temporary bridge across the canal and take control of the village. Semmer remained in her home, unrecognized by the occupying forces, and she secretly continued to assist French soldiers. In the following weeks, she found 17 soldiers who had become injured or separated from their units. She hid the soldiers in a tunnel that connected an unused shed to the old phosphate mine, and there she fed them, found civilian clothes for their disguises and helped 16 of them escape into French-held territory. Only when she was helping the seventeenth soldier was she caught and taken to a German commander who gave her the opportunity to deny that she was deliberately aiding an enemy. But she did not deny it, according to Edwards, saying "I am an orphan. I have but one mother, France! For her, my life!"

She was ordered to be shot, but after being positioned in front of a firing squad, the men were scattered by a sudden artillery attack on the town by the French forces who soon retook control of Éclusier. Semmer survived unharmed.

=== Lake guiding ===
Near Éclusier, the Somme River forms a lake surrounded by bogs and marshy footpaths that were difficult for soldiers to follow so Semmer took on the task of guiding troops as they maneuvered through the wetlands. While escorting a squad of French soldiers to an advanced position, they were all captured by German troops near the village of Frise. The commander there (some sources say it was the same man as before) locked Semmer in the village church. She was certain that the firing squad would be called the following day, but again the French artillery saved her by shelling the village and opening a large hole in one wall of her enclosure. According to Hart, "Creeping past the Germans scattered through Frise, she soon tumbled safe and sound into the nearest French trench."

Semmer remained in the riverside area for another 15 months to care for Allied soldiers and French villagers who were unable to flee to safety. Finally, on the stern advice of the local French commander, she moved to Paris and nursed wounded soldiers there, and she was able to earn a living. She had lost everything at home when the phosphate factory and the entire village was destroyed in the course of the war. Today, two tiny villages are collectively called Éclusier-Vaux.

== Awards ==
- Cross of the Legion of Honor, 1914
- Croix de Guerre (War Cross), 1915
