= Marie Médard =

French librarian

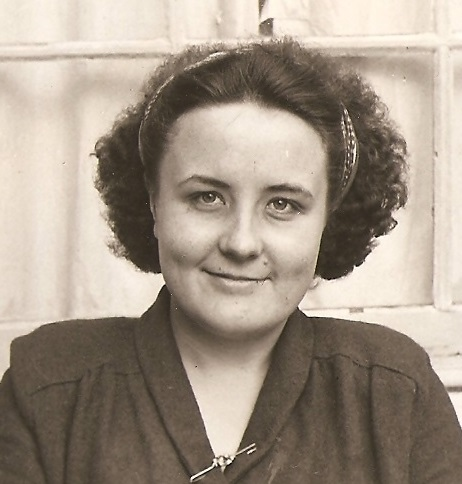
- Marie Médard in 1946
- Born: 4 April 1921; Paris, France
- Died: 27 April 2013 (aged 92); Tours, France
- Spouse: René Fillet (1953–96)
- Military career
- Allegiance: France
- Branch: French Resistance
- Service years: 1942–1945
- Units: Special Operations Executive; Spindle network
- Conflicts: Second World War
- Awards: Chevalier de la Légion d'honneur

Marie Suzanne Médard (4 April 1921 – 27 April 2013) was a French librarian and a member of the French Resistance during the Second World War.

== Early life ==
Médard was born in Paris's 4th arrondissement, into a Protestant family. Her father, Jean, was a minister of the Reformed Church of France, who ministered first at Le Fleix and later at Rouen, where the family was living when war broke out. Her mother was Alice (née Hermann).

== Resistance activities ==
In 1940, while studying history at the Sorbonne, she joined the Fédé (Fédération française des associations chrétiennes d'étudiants), and in 1942 they protested against Nazism by wearing false stars like those imposed on the Jewish population. One of her acquaintances, Hélène Berr, introduced Médard to the Resistance. She began conducting Jewish children to the Zone libre, then, in 1944, she joined the "Jonque" network. One of her tasks was to deliver documents around Paris, by bicycle. She was arrested on 23 June 1944 and tortured without revealing anything. She was kept at Fresnes prison along with other captured Resistance workers and then sent to Ravensbrück concentration camp. (Berr, who was arrested later in the year, was sent to Bergen-Belsen and died there.) Médard later testified that, during this time, she prayed and did not despair. She was liberated by the Swedish Red Cross on 23 April 1945.

== Post-war ==
After the war, Médard worked for reconciliation and joined in a "de-Nazification" exercise, run by Klaus von Bismarck at Vlotho. She became a librarian, working for a time under Yvonne Oddon at the Musée de l'Homme in Paris.

In 1953, she married the librarian René Fillet. Both worked at the Municipal Library in Tours, but in 1978, Marie went to work at the Cujas Library in Paris, retiring in 1983. She was awarded the Croix de Guerre 1939–1945 and made a Chevalier of the Légion d’Honneur.
