= Suzanne Leclézio =

French resistance fighter, nurse (1898–1987)

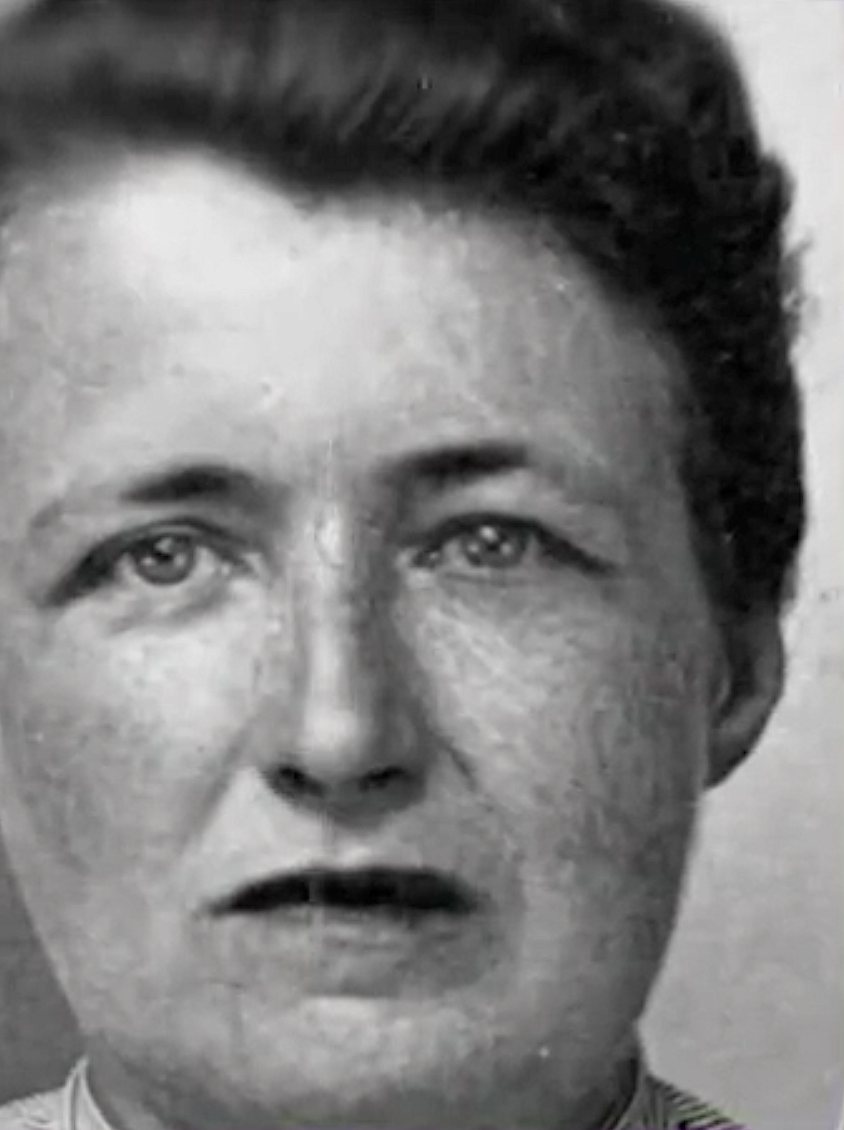
- Born: 13 September 1898; Saint Pierre, British Mauritius
- Died: 1 May 1987 (aged 88); Blangy-le-Château, Normandy, France
- Other names: Georgette, Suzanne Leclezio, Suzanne Le Clézio
- Occupations: French resistance fighter, health worker, nurse, railway social worker
- Partner: Yvonne Ziegler (early 1930s–1987)
- Honours: Chevalier de la Legion d'honneur, Croix de Guerre, Resistance Medal

Suzanne Leclézio (13 September 1898 – 1 May 1987) was a Mauritian-born French resistance fighter, nurse, and railway social worker. During World War II, she worked in the French resistance with the Cohors-Asturies network and alongside her partner Yvonne Ziegler, and led the "Marcadet Street Health Center" (also known as Centre d'hygiène sociale, chemin de fer du Nord) in Paris helping save Jewish families. Leclézio was also known by her French resistance code name, Georgette.

== Early life and education ==
Suzanne Leclézio was born on 13 September 1898, in Saint Pierre, British Mauritius to Franco-Mauritian parents. She was raised in British Mauritius, and at the age of 24 she moved to France. Leclézio enrolled at the age of 33 in a nursing school, from which she graduated the same year, specializing in childcare.

== Career ==
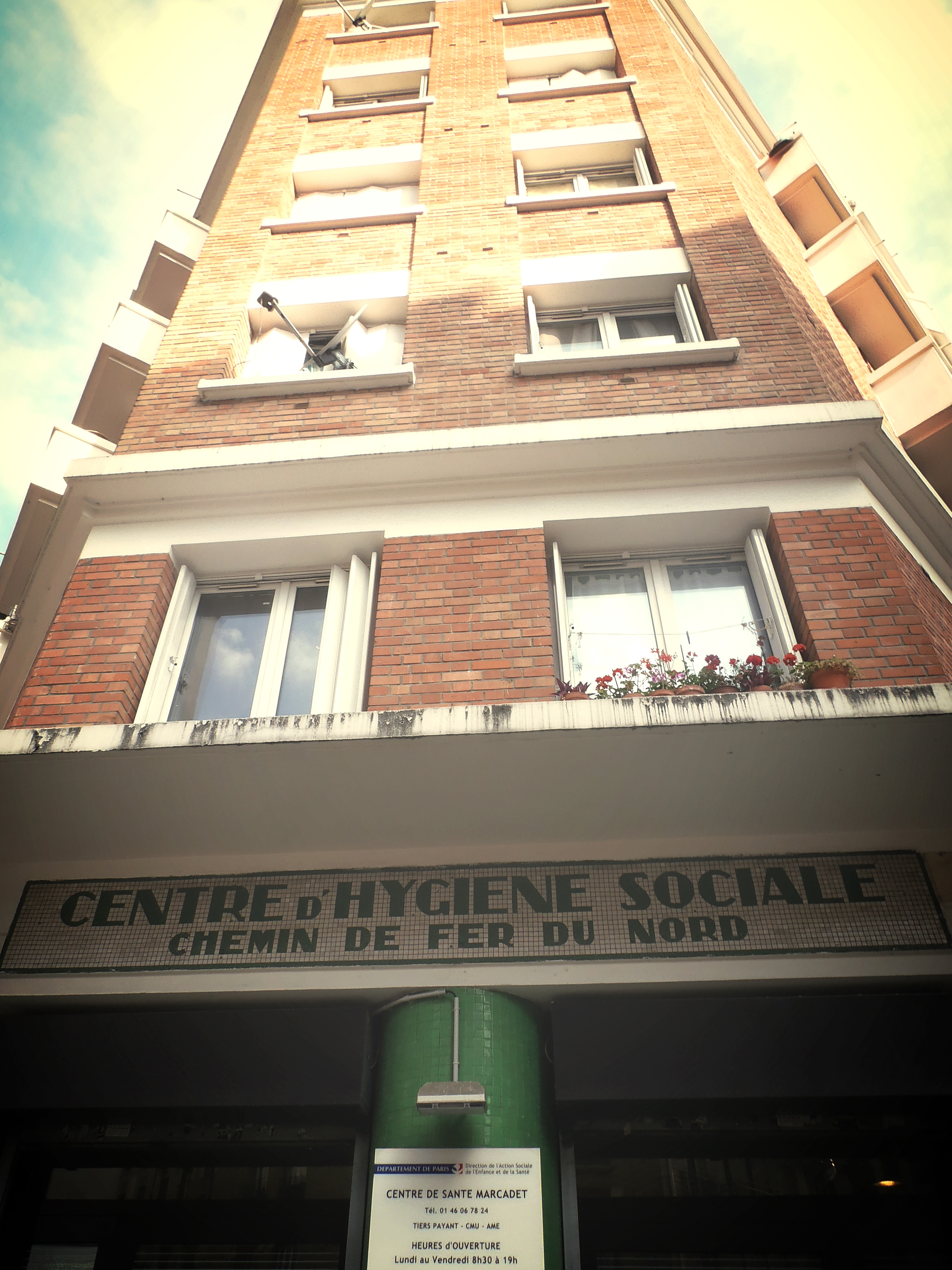
Marcadet Street Health Center (also known as Centre d'hygiène sociale, chemin de fer du Nord) at 22 rue Marcadet

In the 1930s, Leclézio worked at the SNCF social centre in Paris.

Starting in the early 1930s her lesbian partner was artist Yvonne Ziegler, and together they lived in the 14th arrondissement of Paris, at 43 rue Boissonade. Leclézio and Ziegler joined the Cohors-Asturies resistance network together as second lieutenants. Leclézio's code name was Georgette.

The couple housed resistance fighters in their home, and started a health centre at 22 rue Marcadet, the "Marcadet Street Health Center" (also known as Centre d'hygiène sociale, chemin de fer du Nord) where they saved Jewish families and feed Jewish children in the 18th arrondissement of Paris.

Ziegler and Leclézio were denounced, and the Gestapo arrested them on 27 July 1944, at their home on Rue Boissonade. They were tortured, then taken to the Fresnes prison and imprisoned, and followed by deportation by the last convoy of political prisoners on 15 August 1944 to the Ravensbrück concentration camp. Ziegler and Leclézio escaped during the death marches, and in May 1945 were liberated by the Red Army.

Upon her return, Leclézio remained the director of the Marcadet Street Health Center until 1984. Leclézio was named a Chevalier (Knight) of the Legion of Honour, received the French military decorations Croix de Guerre, and the Resistance Medal. Ziegler also received the Croix de Guerre and the Resistance Medal.

They retired to Calvados, at La Charretterie, a Normandy farm. They ended their lives in the retirement home of Blangy-le-Château in Normandy, France.

== Death and legacy ==
Leclézio died at the age of 89 on 1 May 1987, in the retirement home in Blangy-le-Château. A few months afterwards, Ziegler died.

The history and story of Leclézio and Ziegler was lost for many years, and in more recent times it has been documented by French history researcher Laurent Thévenet.

In 2022, a tribute plaque was placed at 22 rue Marcadet, honoring both women and their work. The text on this plaque was deliberated on by the Paris Council, and was the first time the word "lesbian" was used on a public plaque in France.

A small park in Paris is named "Square du 21-avril-1944", in reference to the date of a nearby bombing that occurred in the 18th arrondissement of Paris, leaving 500 death, and many of the wounded had been treated at the Marcadet Street Health Center.
