= Adrienne Ranc-Sakakini =

French accountant and Resistance fighter

- Born: Adrienne Ranc; 4 May 1916; Marseille, France
- Died: 22 June 2014 (aged 98); Annot, France
- Known for: Resistance fighter
- Spouse: Fernand Sakakini (1917–1991)
- Children: Four

Adrienne Ranc-Sakakini (Marseille, 4 May 1916 – Annot, 22 June 2014) was a French accountant and an active member of the French Resistance in her native Marseille during World War II from 1940 to 1944.

== Biography ==
Born Adrienne Ranc, she spent her childhood in the Vauban district in Marseille, the second largest city in France. When World War II began, she was working in the accounting department of an international transportation company, where she had ready access to export information for raw materials destined for shipment to Nazi Germany.

In August 1940, Ranc joined one of the first resistance groups in the city, the French-English-Polish intelligence network called F2, created only a month earlier by the Polish government, which was working in exile in London. The F2 network was active throughout France and Ranc's unit was monitoring the maritime port of Marseille, responsible for reporting the movements of enemy ships, arsenals and diplomats.

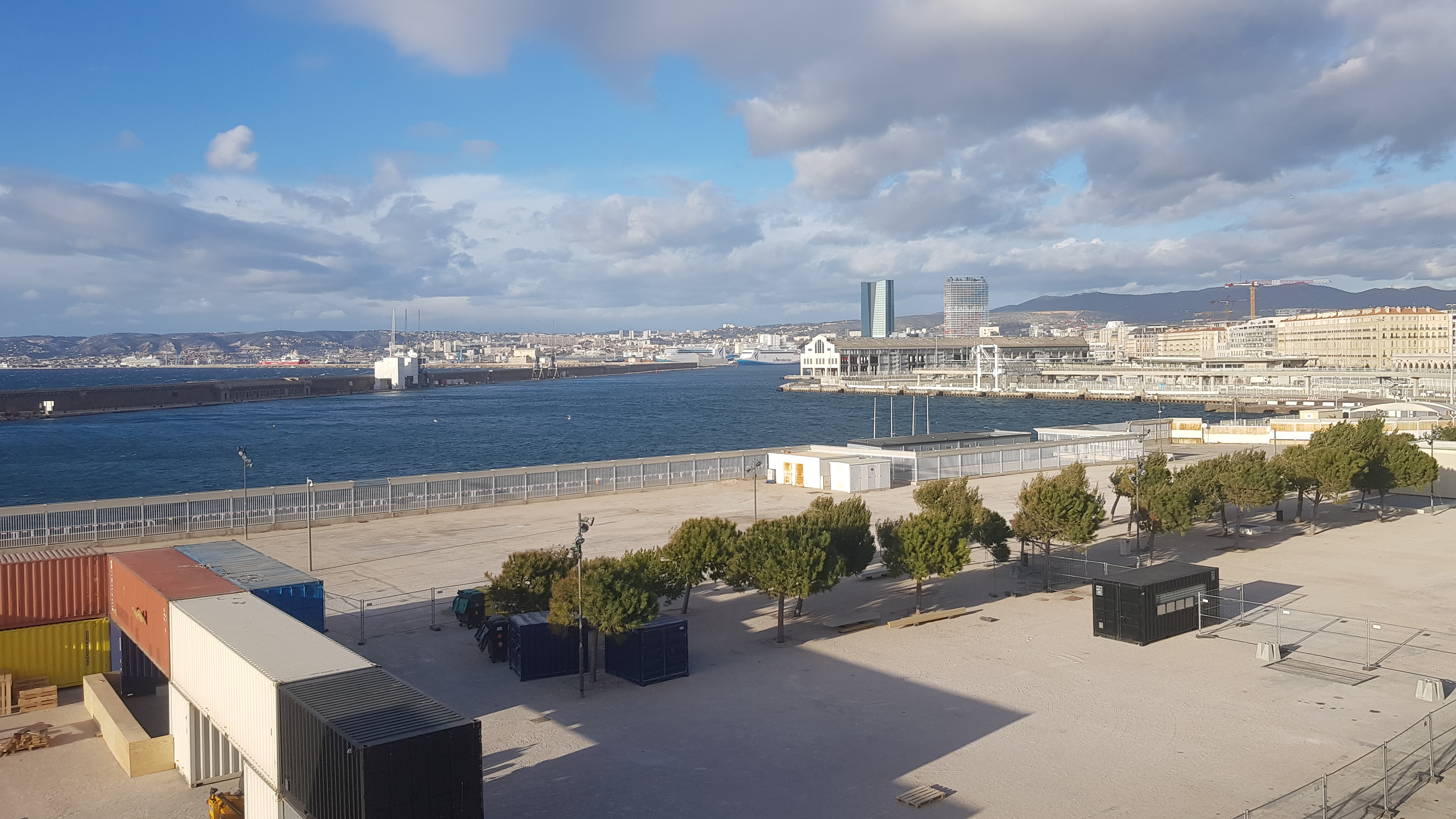
View of the Port of Marseille.

Using her F2 contacts, Ranc sent hundreds of coded transmissions to the Free France forces for two years, but was exposed in 1942 and arrested by the police of the French Vichy government which was allied with Nazi Germany. She was tortured in Fort Saint-Nicolas located in the harbor area of Marseille, and then imprisoned in the Presentines prison for women nearby. She was later transferred to Saint-Joseph Prison in Lyon, France. She was released from prison in 1943 "thanks to the payment of a deposit" and she once again established links with members of the resistance, called the Maquis. In 1944, she was actively involved in the Allied Forces' battles to liberate Marseille from Nazi occupation. For her bravery during the war, she was highly decorated.

During these battles, she met her future husband Fernand Sakakini (1917 – 1991), a fellow Resistance fighter, with whom she went on to have four children.

=== Post-war years ===
Known as Adrienne Ranc-Sakakini, she joined the Rassemblement pour la France (RPF), a political party created by Charles de Gaulle, a future president of France, in 1947, and became a member of its organizing committee in the part of southern France that includes the city of Marseille.

She died on 22 June 2014 in Annot, France, in a car accident at age 98. She is buried in Saint-Pierre Cemetery in Marseille.

== Tributes ==
- The road that links Marseille's Saint-Tronc district to that of Saint-Loup was renamed and dedicated to Ranc-Sakakini in 2017 because of her "exemplary courage."

== Distinctions ==
Ranc-Sakakini received numerous awards for her valor during World War II including the following.

- Officer of the Legion of Honor (April 12, 2009)
- War Cross 1939–1945
- Internment medal for Resistance events
- Cross of Merit (Poland)
