= Revue d'Histoire de la Shoah =

French academic journal covering the Holocaust and other genocides

Revue d'histoire de la Shoah (English: "Shoah History Review") is a biannual French academic journal covering the Holocaust (Shoah) and other genocides throughout history. It is published by Mémorial de la Shoah, a Holocaust museum in Paris. The editor-in-chief is Georges Bensoussan. The journal publishes articles from researchers and specialised academics, as well as testimonies and previously unpublished documents.

The journal was established in 1946 and is "the first and only French publication about the destruction of the Jews in Europe".
