= Eugène Droulers =

French Resistance member

Eugène Droulers (30 July 1917 – 14 April 1945) was a Frenchman who was active in the French Resistance during World War II and a pilot Mort pour la France during Ardennes-Alsace Campaign on his Piper J-3 Cub. He was posthumously awarded the "Croix de Chevalier" of the Legion of Honour in 1946.

== Honours and awards ==
- Escapees' Medal
- Resistance Medal
- War Cross 1939–1945
- Knight of the Legion of Honour
