= Germain Ayache =

Moroccan historian

Germain Ayache (Arabic: جرمان عياش) was a Moroccan historian born in 1915.

== Biography ==
He was born to a Jewish Moroccan family in 1915, with some sources giving his place of birth as Berkane and others Saïdia. He earned a degree with distinction in European classical literature in Bordeaux, France in 1935. He returned to Morocco to teach, then moved back to France. He returned to Morocco at the time of its independence. He joined the faculty of history at the college of literature in Rabat in 1957. He died in Nice August 3 1990.

== Notable works ==
- أصول حرب الريف [Origins of the Rif War]
- دراسات في تاريخ المغرب [Studies in the History of Morocco]
