= Fernand Bonnier de La Chapelle =

French Resistance member (1922–1942)

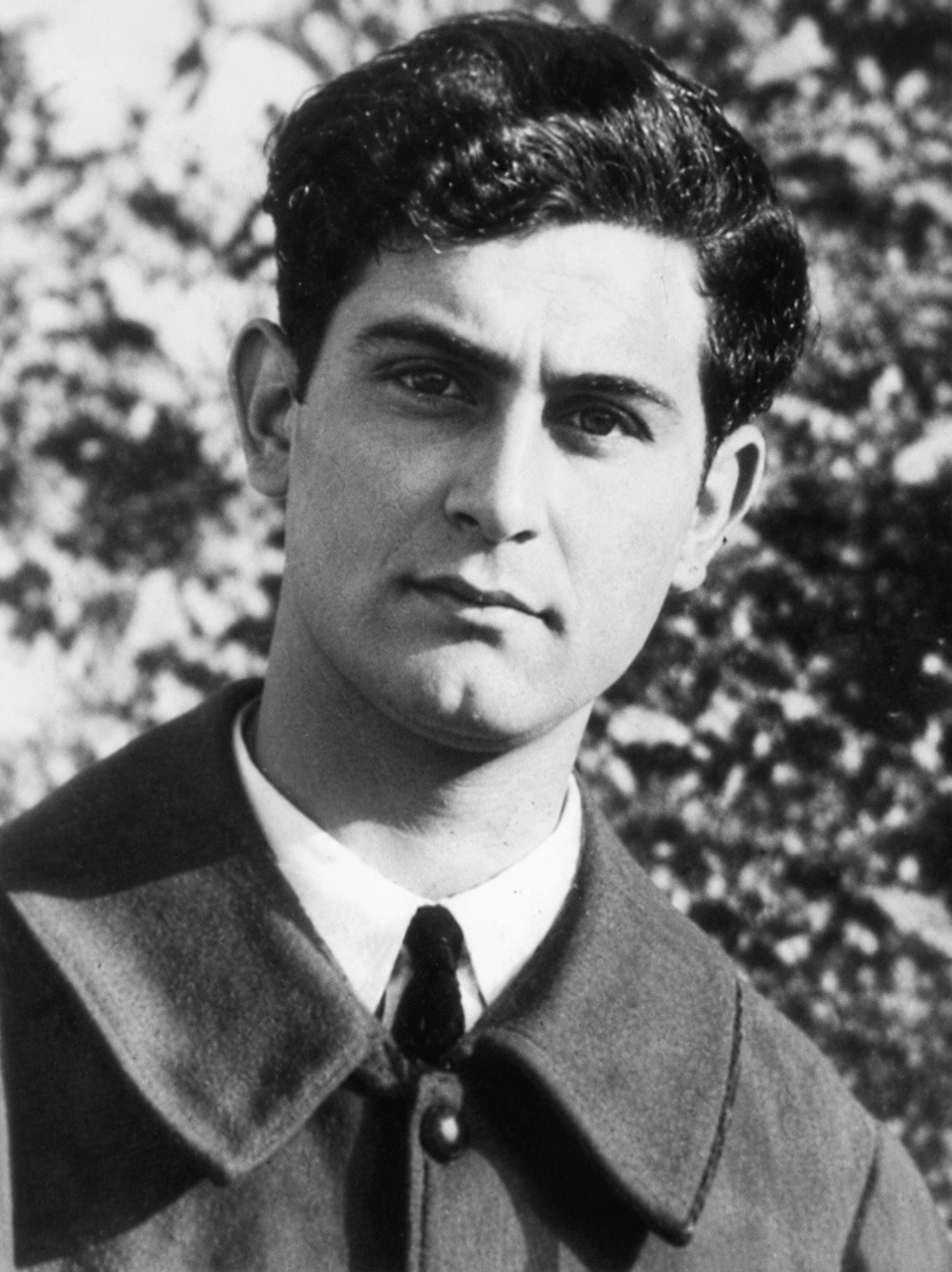
- Born: 4 November 1922; Algiers, French Algeria
- Died: 26 December 1942 (aged 20); Algiers, French Algeria
- Cause of death: Execution by firing squad
- Known for: Assassination of François Darlan

Fernand Bonnier de La Chapelle (French pronunciation: [fɛʁnɑ̃ bɔnje də la ʃapɛl]; 4 November 1922 – 26 December 1942) was an anti-Vichy member of the French Resistance during World War II. He assassinated Admiral of the Fleet François Darlan, a key political figure of Vichy France and the high commissioner of French North Africa and West Africa, on 24 December 1942 in Algiers.

== Biography ==
Bonnier de La Chapelle was born in Algiers, son of a French journalist who was a monarchist and a protester against fascism. Bonnier was involved with a royalist group that wanted to make the pretender to the French throne, the Count of Paris, the King of France. He studied at the Lycée Stanislas in Paris after France's surrender to Nazi Germany, and attended a demonstration of anti-German students on Armistice Day 11 November 1940 at the Arc de Triomphe. He then joined the free zone by illegally crossing the border. He returned to Algiers (where his father was a journalist for The Algerian Dispatch) and visited the Youth Camps (L'organisation des Chantiers de la jeunesse française (CJF)). After obtaining his degree in 1942, he was surprised by the Allied landings on 8 November 1942 during Operation Torch. A monarchist and an ardent anti-Vichyiste, he regretted that his comrades had participated in Operation Torch and enabled the success of the landings but had not asked him to participate.

Following the landing, Bonnier was one of the first to commit to the Corps Francs d'Afrique training under the initial direction of Henri d'Astier de la Vigerie, former leader of the north African resistance. This training was initiated by a resistance group of 8 November. They opposed the "Admiral of the Fleet" François Darlan who was collaborating with the Nazis. They further objected to serving under generals who had attacked the Allied forces at Oran and in Morocco, including Admiral Jean-Pierre Esteva, who had surrendered Tunisia to Axis forces without a fight.

When d'Astier was appointed head of the police as Deputy Secretary of the Interior, the Corps Francs d'Afrique maintained unofficial relations with the force. Bonnier served as the liaison. He often visited the home of Henri d'Astier, where he also met Lieutenant Father Pierre-Marie Cordier.

After Darlan surrendered Algiers to Allied forces, General Dwight D. Eisenhower, who feared armed resistance from Vichy sympathizers among the French, agreed to allow Darlan to govern French North Africa and West Africa under Vichy policies. This caused consternation in the French population and in Washington and London.

=== Motivation ===
At that time, members of the Corps Francs repeatedly covered the walls with slogans that mocked Darlan, such as "Admiral to the fleet!" Darlan was not only attacked for his past collaboration with Germany, but also for his present attitude, upholding the exclusion laws inspired by Germany, as well as other repressive Vichy policies, such as the internment in concentration camps of thousands of French resistance fighters, Spanish Republicans and Central European Democrats.

=== Conspiracy ===
Bonnier and three of his comrades, Otto Gross, Robert and Philippe Tournier Ragueneau decided to assassinate Darlan. They had participated a few weeks earlier in the operation of 8 November 1942. The four drew straws and Bonnier drew the shortest. Following the draw, Bonnier procured an old "Ruby" 7.65 pistol. The day of 24 December 1942 was chosen. Abbé Cordier heard his confession and gave him absolution. Failing to find Darlan that morning at the Summer Palace, he lunched that day with d'Astier.

=== Attack ===
They returned to the Summer Palace after eating and settled in a hallway. After some time, the Admiral appeared, accompanied by Frigate captain Hourcade. Bonnier shot Darlan twice, once in the face and once in the chest, and then shot Hourcade in the thigh. The occupants of the other offices in the Palais captured him. Under interrogation he claimed he had acted alone and seemed unworried about the consequences.

=== Trial and execution ===
The next morning, 25 December 1942, he was convicted in less than an hour. Bonnier declared that he had acted only for reasons of moral purity. The judge signed a removal order sending Bonnier to the military tribunal of Algiers. The court sat that night and rejected requests for further investigation. My Viala and Sansonetti acted as lawyers for the accused. The rest of the procedure took place in less than a quarter of an hour. The court discounted Bonnier's motivations and age and sentenced him to death.

The lawyers requested clemency. The law required the appeal to be heard by the Head of State, Philippe Pétain. That procedure would have had to await the end of hostilities. Charles Noguès, dean of the Imperial Council, proclaimed himself acting High Commissioner, under an unpublished order issued by Darlan on 2 December 1942. The order was invalid according to the legal order of Vichy. Nogues immediately rejected the clemency petition. Henri Giraud, who was then head of military justice as Commander-in-chief, refused to postpone execution, and ordered his execution the next morning at 7:30.

Alarmed by his conviction, Bonnier asked to speak to a police officer and Commissioner Garidacci responded. Bonnier revealed that Abbé Cordier was aware of his intentions and implicated Henri d'Astier. Garidacci kept this confession to himself, with the apparent intention of later blackmailing d'Astier.

Giraud was elected that day by members of the Vichy Imperial Council, to replace Darlan. When d'Astier and others appealed to Giraud, he told them it was too late.

Bonnier de la Chapelle was executed in Hussein-Dey, the square known as "the shot". His speedy trial and execution fuelled theories about who may have been behind the assassination.

British Foreign Secretary Anthony Eden reflected on the execution with his comment "It shows how wrong you get if you compromise with evil. You find yourself shooting a good man for doing something you should have done yourself."

=== Posthumous rehabilitation ===
Bonnier was rehabilitated by a Chamber judgment revision of the Court of Appeals of Algiers on 21 December 1945, which ruled that the assassination had been "in the interest of liberation of France." In June 1950, his body was repatriated to Bruyères Cemetery in Sèvres,

On 19 August 1953, a decree signed by President Vincent Auriol granted Fernand Bonnier de la Chapelle a posthumous Médaille militaire accompanied by the Croix de Guerre with palms and the Resistance Medal.

Historians have speculated that Bonnier acted on the encouragement of Charles de Gaulle's entourage or under instruction from the British Special Operations Executive, while judicial records show he was involved with a royalist group aiming to replace Darlan with Henri of Orléans.

Every year, a delegation from Nouvelle Action Royaliste leaves flowers on his grave in Sèvres.

== Cultural depictions ==
In the historical film De Gaulle : Résistance, directed by Antonin Baudry, Fernand Bonnier de La Chapelle is portrayed by french actor Florian Lesieur.

== Sources ==
- Rick Atkinson, An Army at Dawn: The War in North Africa, 1942–1943, New York: Henry Holt, 2002.
- Julian Jackson, France: The Dark Years: 1940–1944, New York: Oxford University Press, 2001.
- Vergez-Chaignon, Bénédicte (2019). Une juvénile fureur: Bonnier de la Chapelle, l'assassin de l'amiral Darlan. Paris: Perrin. ISBN 978-2-26207-690-0.
- Douglas Porch, The Path to Victory: The Mediterranean Theater in World War II, New York: Farrar, Straus and Giroux, 2004.
