= De Gaulle (2026 film) =

French biopic film

- French release poster
- French: La Bataille de Gaulle
- Directed by: Antonin Baudry
- Written by: Antonin Baudry; Bérénice Vila
- Based on: A Certain Idea of France: The Life of Charles De Gaulle by Julian Jackson
- Produced by: Axelle Boucaï; Ardavan Safaee; Jérôme Seydoux
- Starring: Simon Abkarian; Niels Schneider; Thierry Lhermitte; Karim Leklou
- Cinematography: Pierre Cottereau; Giora Bejach
- Edited by: Rehman Nizar Ali; Katie McQuerrey
- Music by: Volker Bertelmann (Part 1) and Théo Cascio (Part 2)
- Production company: Pathé
- Distributed by: Pathé
- Release dates: 20 May 2026 (Cannes); 3 June 2026 (Résistance); 26 June 2026 (Liberté)
- Running time: 158 minutes (Résistance); 159 minutes (Liberté)
- Countries: France; Belgium
- Languages: French; English
- Budget: €74 million
- Box office: $20.9 million (Résistance); $14.9 million (Liberté)

De Gaulle (French: La Bataille de Gaulle) is a 2026 two-part epic biographical drama film directed by Antonin Baudry, co-written with Bérénice Vila, and based on the nonfiction book A Certain Idea of France: The Life of Charles de Gaulle by Julian Jackson. It stars Simon Abkarian as Charles de Gaulle, and follows the general as a leading figure in the French Resistance during the Second World War. It also stars Niels Schneider, Thierry Lhermitte, Benoît Magimel, Anamaria Vartolomei, and Simon Russell Beale. This is the biggest French film project of 2026.

The first part, De Gaulle: Résistance, also distributed as De Gaulle: Tilting Iron (French: L'Âge de fer, lit. 'The Iron Age'), had its world premiere out of competition at the 2026 Cannes Film Festival on 20 May, followed by its theatrical release in France by Pathé on 3 June.

The second part, De Gaulle: Liberté, also distributed as De Gaulle: The Sovereign Edge (French: J'écris ton nom, lit. 'I Write Your Name'), was released in theaters in France on 26 June.

== Plot ==
The diptych follows Charles de Gaulle from the collapse of France in 1940 to the Liberation of Paris in 1944, interweaving his political struggle with large-scale military campaigns, the clandestine Resistance in occupied France and the personal stories of those who join the fight. Alongside the historical events, the films include a romantic storyline between the young resistance fighters Fernand and Livia, while de Gaulle's tempestuous relationships with Winston Churchill and the Allied leadership frequently provide moments of humour amid the war and political confrontation.

=== First Part - De Gaulle: Résistance ===
The film opens with the broadcast of the final message transmitted on Polish radio in Warsaw following the invasion of Poland by German troops in September 1939, which led to World War II.

In June 1940, France is also invaded by the Germans. French Army is collapsing but Brigadier General Charles de Gaulle, convinced that the war will continue beyond the fall of metropolitan France, clashes with the increasingly defeatist political leadership. When Paul Reynaud's government falls and Marshal Philippe Pétain announces that France will seek an armistice, de Gaulle refuses to accept defeat.

With his aide Geoffroy Chodron de Courcel, he escapes to London. There he attempts to persuade British Prime Minister Winston Churchill that France is still in the war, despite having neither a government, an army nor significant political support behind him. Churchill is intrigued by the virtually unknown French general's extraordinary self-confidence, beginning an alliance marked throughout the film by affection, exasperation and increasingly theatrical arguments.

Allowed access to the BBC, de Gaulle broadcasts the Appeal of 18 June, asking French soldiers, engineers and civilians to continue the struggle. The response is initially tiny. While de Gaulle behaves as though he already represents France, British officials frequently remind him that almost nobody has yet recognised his authority. Assisted by his entourage, including his secretary Blazej, he begins improvising the institution of what will become Free France.

In occupied Paris, seventeen-year-old high-schooler Fernand Bonnier de La Chapelle refuses to accommodate himself to German rule. He meets Livia, a young woman equally determined to resist, and their political rebellion gradually becomes a love affair.

Fernand and other students help organise the 11 November 1940 demonstration around the Arc de Triomphe, openly defying the German occupation. The protest is violently dispersed. Fernand and Livia become increasingly involved in resistance activity, their relationship developing as the risks surrounding them grow.

De Gaulle meanwhile discovers that declaring France still at war is easier than creating the forces capable of proving it. After the British attack the French fleet at Mers-el-Kébir, killing French sailors to prevent the ships from falling into German hands, his position becomes even more precarious. Vichy portrays him as a British puppet, while de Gaulle loses much of his support.

Unable to rely on metropolitan territory, he turns toward the French colonial empire. A succession of audacious missions and political gambles brings several African territories into the Free French camp. De Gaulle travels through Africa himself, while officers such as Philippe Leclerc begin transforming scattered colonial forces into an army.

Not every gamble succeeds. The Anglo-Free French expedition against Dakar ends disastrously when the colony refuses to rally and Vichy forces fire on the attackers. De Gaulle, humiliated and increasingly isolated, nevertheless refuses to abandon his claim to represent a France that has not surrendered.

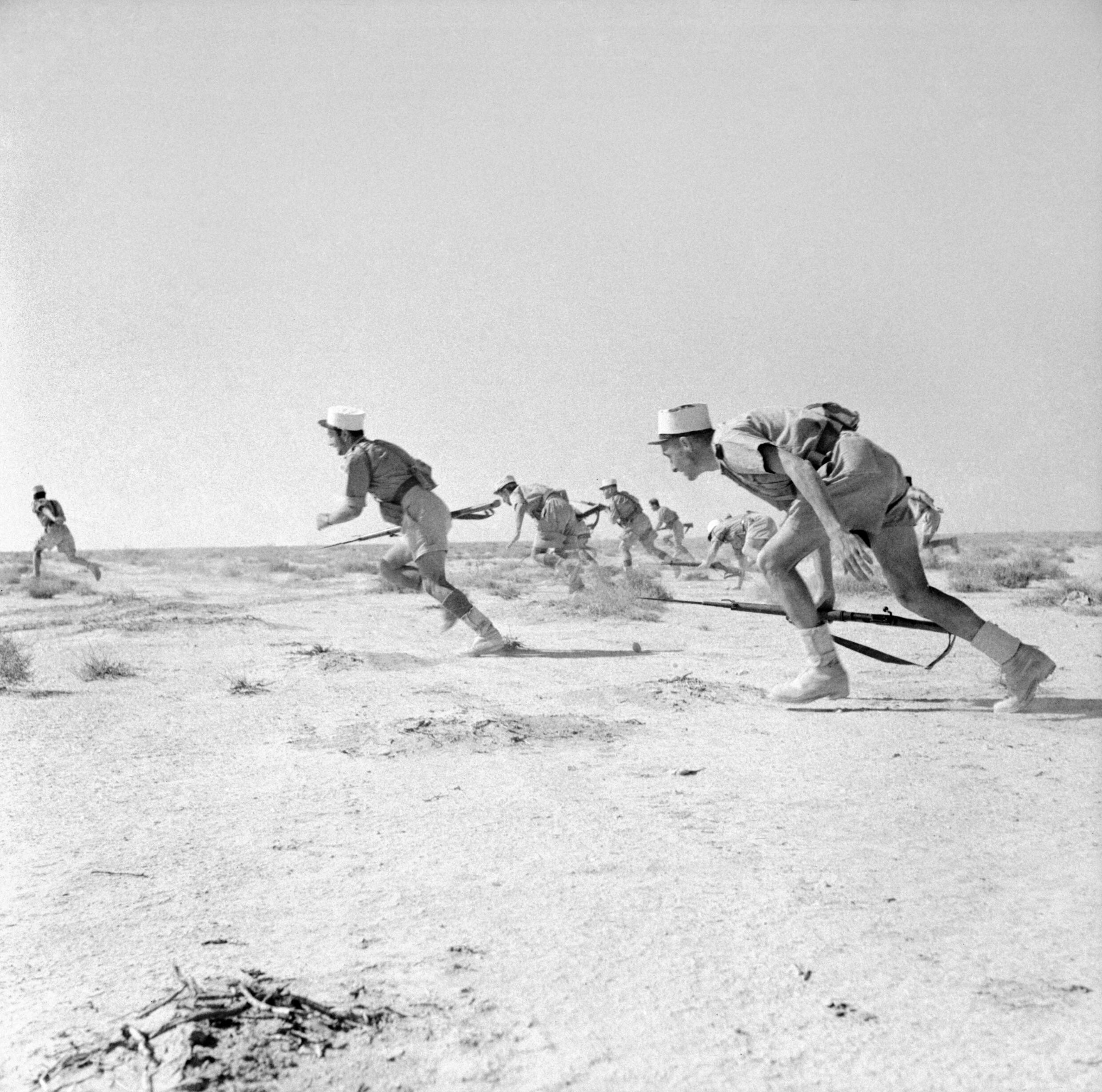
The film depicts the heroic resistance of 1st Free French Brigade at the Battle of Bir Hakeim.

Free French soldiers soon gave military substance to this claim. In the desert, Leclerc led increasingly daring operations against Axis positions. Meanwhile, General Pierre Kœnig commanded the Free French forces at Bir Hakeim, covering the British army's retreat in 1942.

Surrounded by Rommel’s vastly superior armored divisions, Kœnig’s men withstood German and Italian attacks for 13 days, enduring artillery, armored, and air assaults during one of the film's major battle sequences.

On the night of June 10–11, 1942, French forces broke through the Axis encirclement to reach British lines. The film depicts British ambulance driver Susan Travers driving General Kœnig’s car through a relentless barrage of fire before reaching the British army.

The resistance and final breakthrough of the French forces, previously considered a marginal element, transformed them into a military presence the Allies can no longer easily dismiss.

The war changes again when the United States enters the conflict. President Franklin D. Roosevelt distrusts de Gaulle, regarding him as difficult, unpredictable and potentially authoritarian. American officials search for French leaders who might provide an alternative.

Following Operation Torch, Allied troops land in French North Africa. Rather than immediately handing power to de Gaulle's movement, the Americans reach an agreement with Admiral François Darlan, one of the most senior figures of the Vichy regime. To de Gaulle, who has spent two years refusing any compromise with Vichy, the arrangement is intolerable.

Fernand, now in Algiers, reaches the same conclusion from a very different path. His youthful resistance in Paris, his relationship with Livia and his experiences under the occupation have led him into a struggle whose political consequences are now much larger than himself. Convinced that leaving Darlan in power betrays everything for which the Resistance has fought, he decides to act.

On 24 December 1942, Fernand enters Darlan's headquarters and shoots him. He is immediately arrested. After a rapid trial, the twenty-year-old is sentenced to death and executed by firing squad on 26 December.

Darlan's death removes one obstacle to de Gaulle, but it does not resolve the struggle for control of French North Africa. The Americans now place their hopes in another French general, Henri Giraud, setting the stage for a confrontation over who will ultimately speak for France.

=== Second Part - De Gaulle: Liberté ===
The second film begins in 1943 struggles taking place simultaneously in government offices, clandestine apartments in France and on the battlefield. De Gaulle is no longer the solitary exiled leader of 1940, but success has created a new danger: France may be liberated without being allowed to determine its own political future.

In the Libyan desert, General Leclerc leads the forces of Free France northwards from Chad. His campaign culminates in fighting around Ksar Ghilane, where French troops face German armour and air attacks. Leclerc's aggressive leadership and willingness to take extraordinary risks make the African campaign one of the central action threads of the second film.

In France, Jean Moulin, operating under the name "Rex", is charged by de Gaulle with bringing together the deeply divided movements of the French Resistance. Livia, continuing the struggle after Fernand's death, becomes part of this underground world of couriers, coded messages, clandestine meetings and German surveillance.

Moulin must persuade Gaullists, communists, socialists, conservatives, trade unionists and independent resistance organisations to accept a common political structure. They disagree about how to fight the occupation and France's political future after liberation.

On 27 May 1943, Moulin succeeds in bringing representatives of the major Resistance organisations together to form the National Council of the Resistance. For de Gaulle, the achievement is decisive: while Roosevelt questions his legitimacy abroad, the organised Resistance inside France increasingly recognises him as its political leader.

Moulin's success also makes him a major target of the Gestapo. He is betrayed and arrested with other Resistance leaders at Caluire-et-Cuire. Interrogated and tortured under Klaus Barbie, he refuses to disclose information about the organisation he has helped construct. He dies in captivity, but the unified Resistance survives him.

At the same time, another confrontation is unfolding in Algiers. Roosevelt supports General Henri Giraud, whose Army of Africa and more accommodating attitude make him attractive to the Americans. Giraud has military power and Allied backing; de Gaulle possesses the political legitimacy of the Resistance and refuses to compromise on the restoration of the French Republic.

Forced into an uneasy partnership, the two generals become co-presidents of the newly created French Committee of National Liberation. Their supposed partnership rapidly turns into a political duel. De Gaulle challenges Giraud over the continued presence of officials associated with Vichy, manoeuvres for support within the committee and gradually strips his rival of political influence.

The diplomatic struggle frequently becomes as combative as the fighting in the desert. De Gaulle argues with Churchill, confronts American representatives and refuses demands that he believes would reduce France to a subordinate Allied power. His obstinacy alternately infuriates and amuses Churchill, whose own friendship with de Gaulle survives repeated confrontation.

Giraud is eventually marginalised, leaving de Gaulle as the dominant leader of fighting France. Yet Roosevelt still refuses to give him everything he wants. American plans contemplate administering liberated French territory under Allied military authority, while de Gaulle insists that French officials must assume authority as German forces retreat.

After the Normandy landings in June 1944, the military and political struggles begin to converge. Allied armies advance across France while Leclerc commands the 2nd Armored Division, eager to fulfil the promise he and his men have carried since their African campaigns: to return to Paris.

In August, the Resistance launches an insurrection in Paris. Barricades appear in the streets and fighting erupts between Resistance fighters and German forces. Livia experiences the liberation from inside the city, connecting the underground struggle begun by the young resisters of the first film with the approaching armies of Free France.

The Allied high command initially intends to bypass Paris and pursue the retreating German army. De Gaulle insists that the capital cannot be abandoned, while Leclerc presses forward. Eventually, Dwight D. Eisenhower authorises Leclerc's French division to take the city.

Leclerc's troops race toward Paris. After years of fighting across Africa and Europe, elements of the division enter the capital as Resistance forces continue battling the German garrison. French and Spanish soldiers of the division penetrate the centre of the city, and the liberation becomes the culmination of the film's parallel stories of soldiers, politicians and underground fighters.

The German occupation collapses and Paris returns to French control.

De Gaulle enters the liberated capital determined to establish French political authority before any Allied administration can take its place. He travels through a city filled with enormous crowds, culminating in his procession through Paris as the man who had arrived in London four years earlier with almost no followers is now acclaimed as the leader of liberated France.

The liberation is accompanied by the words of Paul Éluard's poem Liberté, whose recurring declaration, "J'écris ton nom", gives the second film its French title and connects the military victory to the Resistance's ideal of freedom.

The film concludes on Armistice Day in November 1944. Churchill arrives in Paris as de Gaulle's guest. The two men, whose relationship has survived four years of quarrels, strategic disagreements, insults, political crises and mutual dependence, appear together in the capital of a restored France.

For de Gaulle, the battle begun in isolation in London in June 1940 has been won: France has been liberated not merely as Allied territory, but as a sovereign nation represented by its own government.

== Cast ==
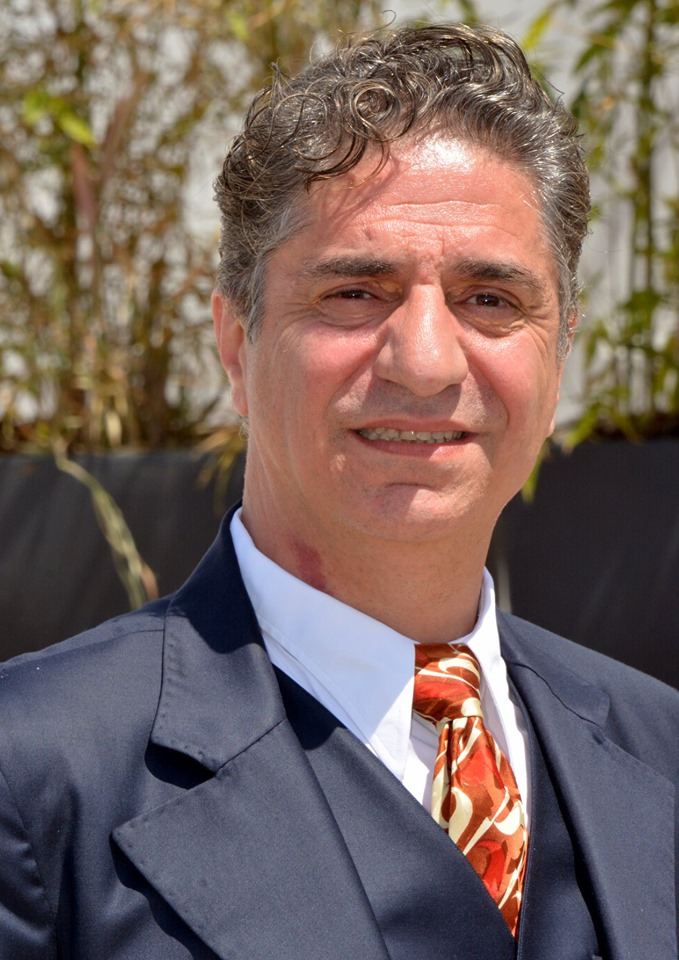
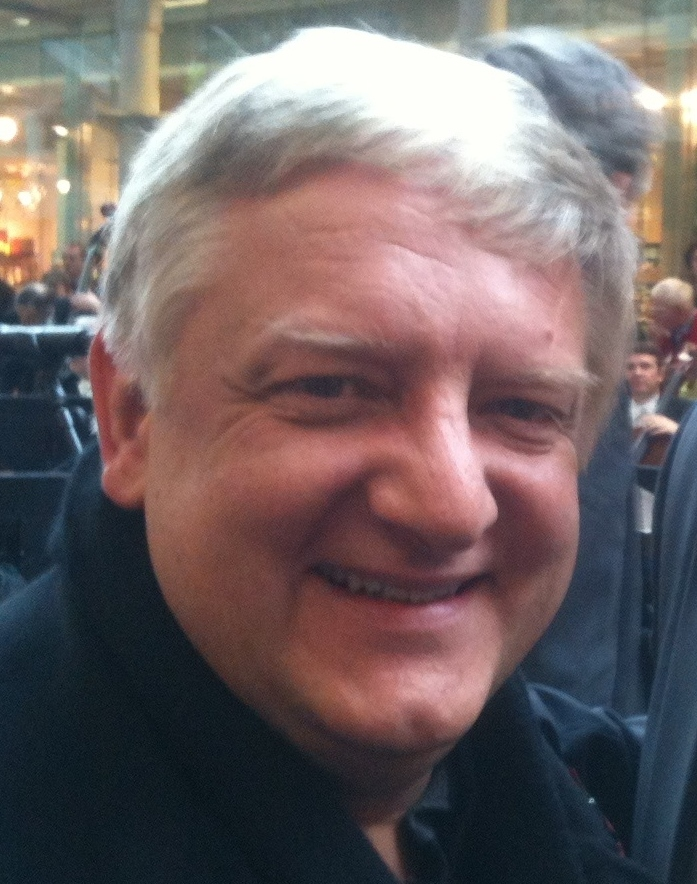
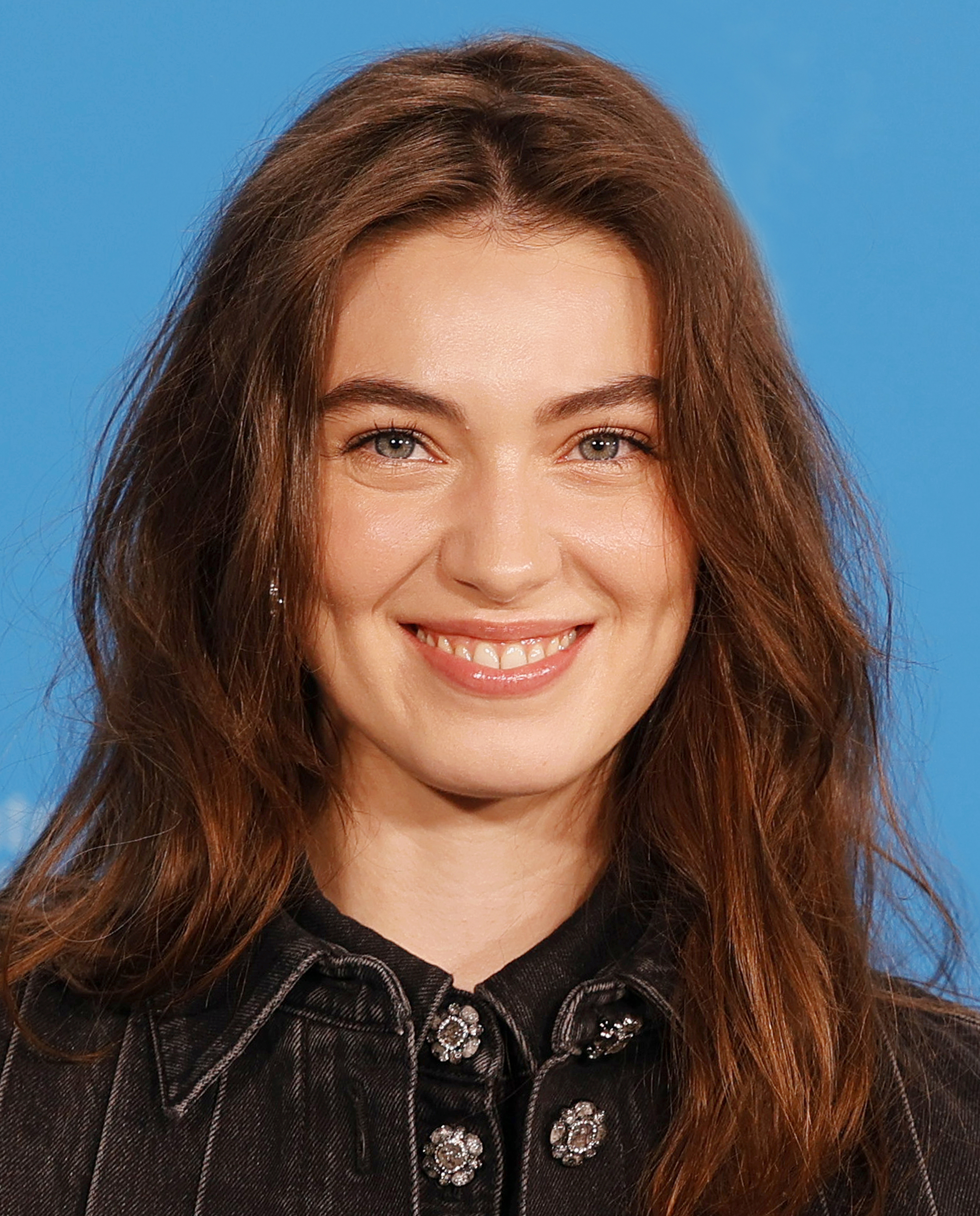
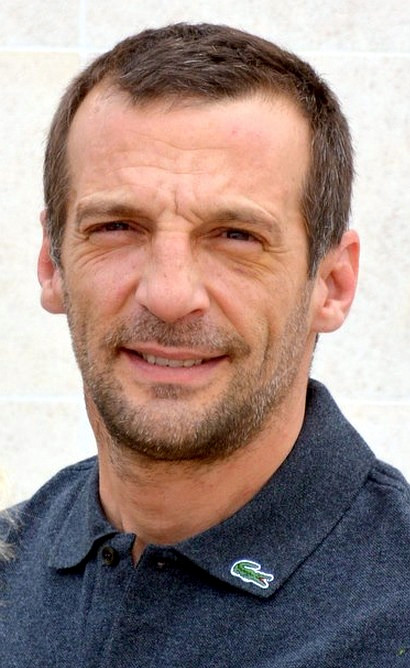
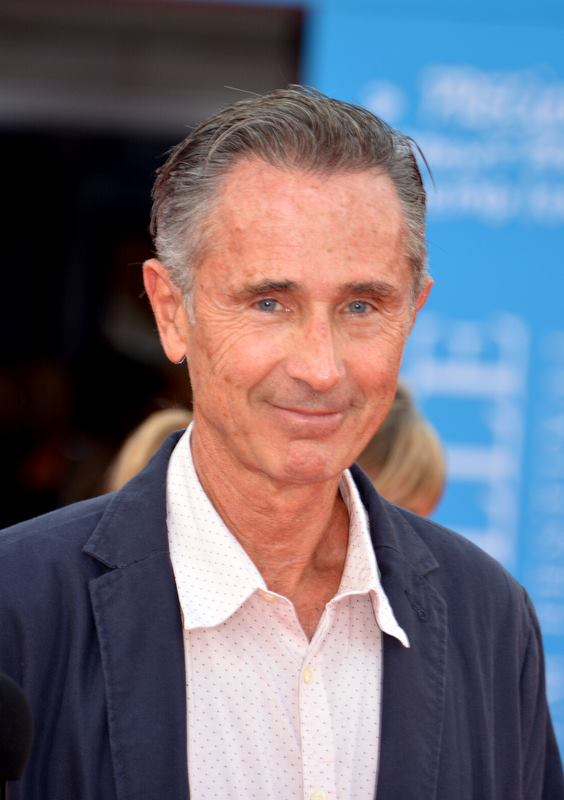
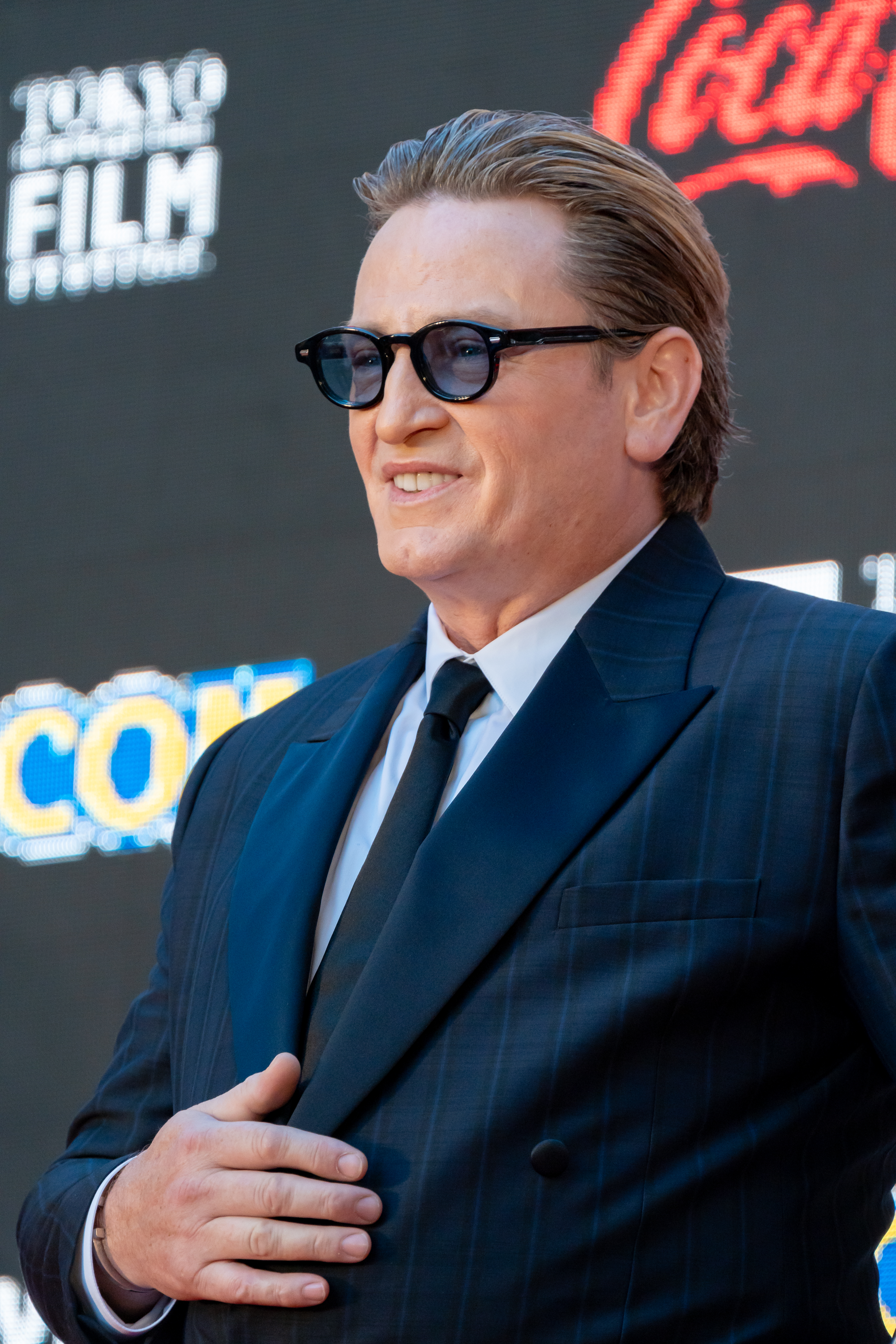
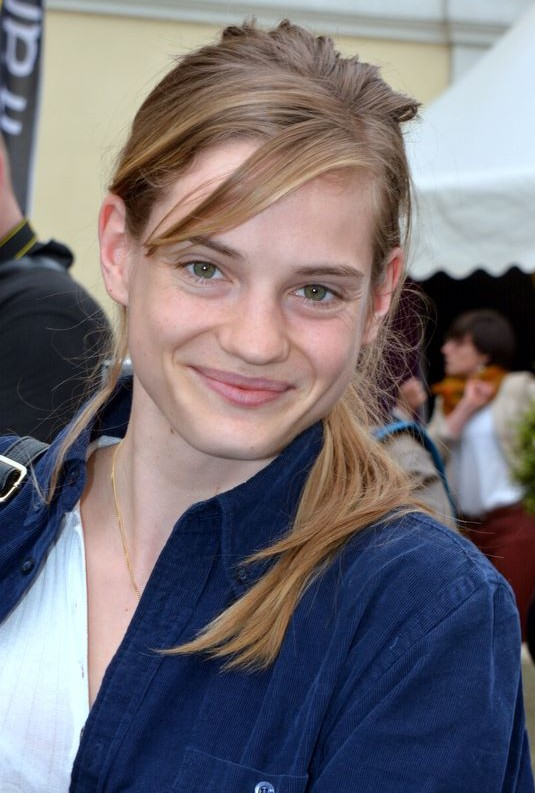
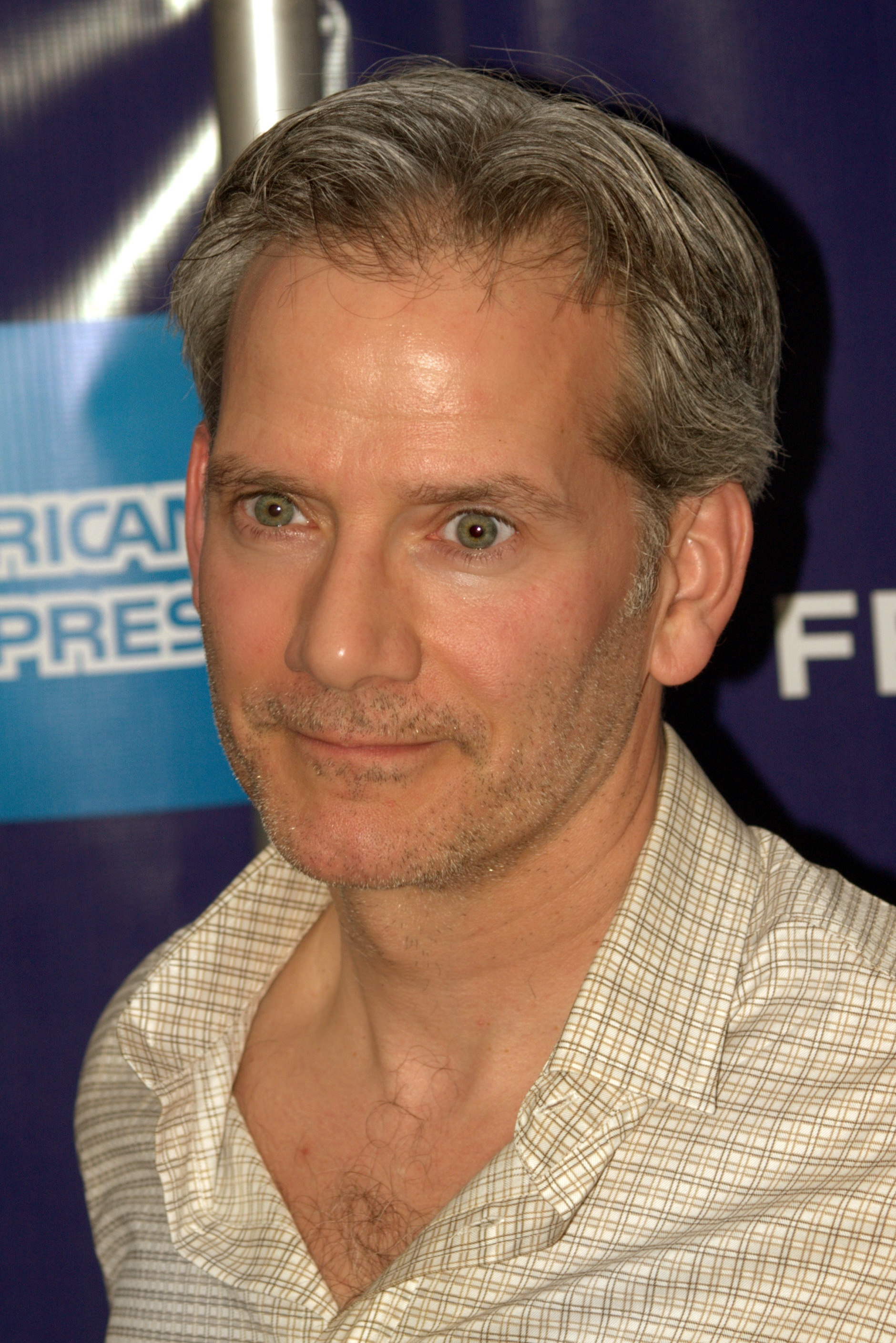
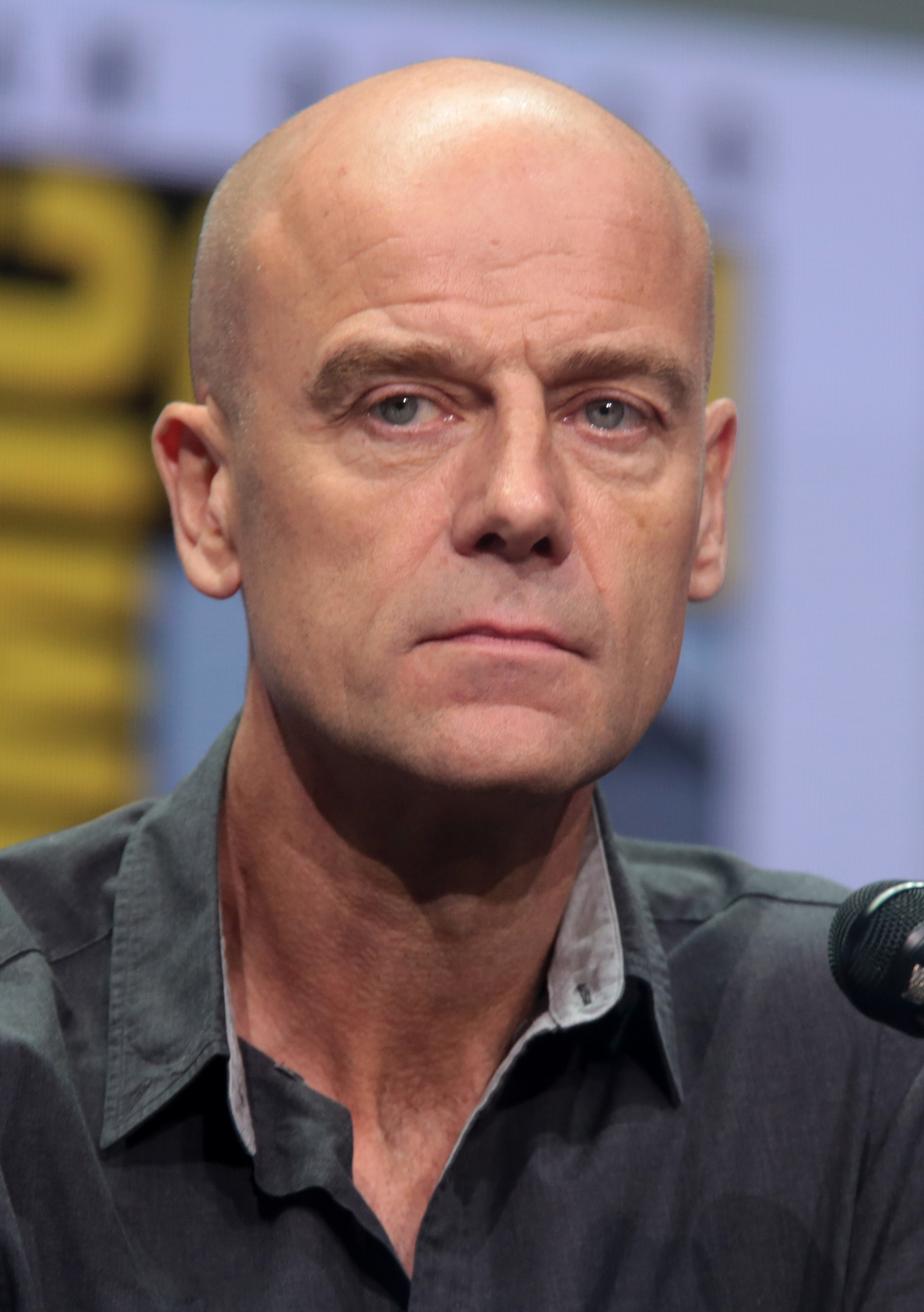
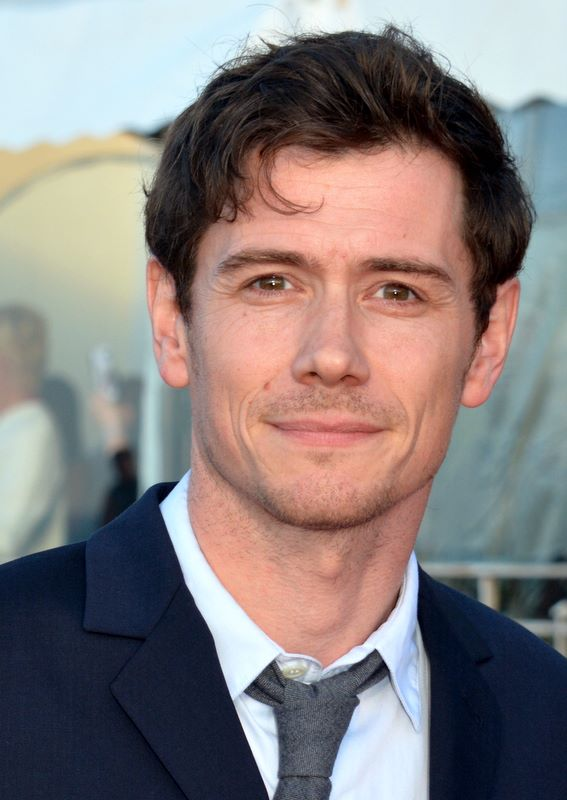
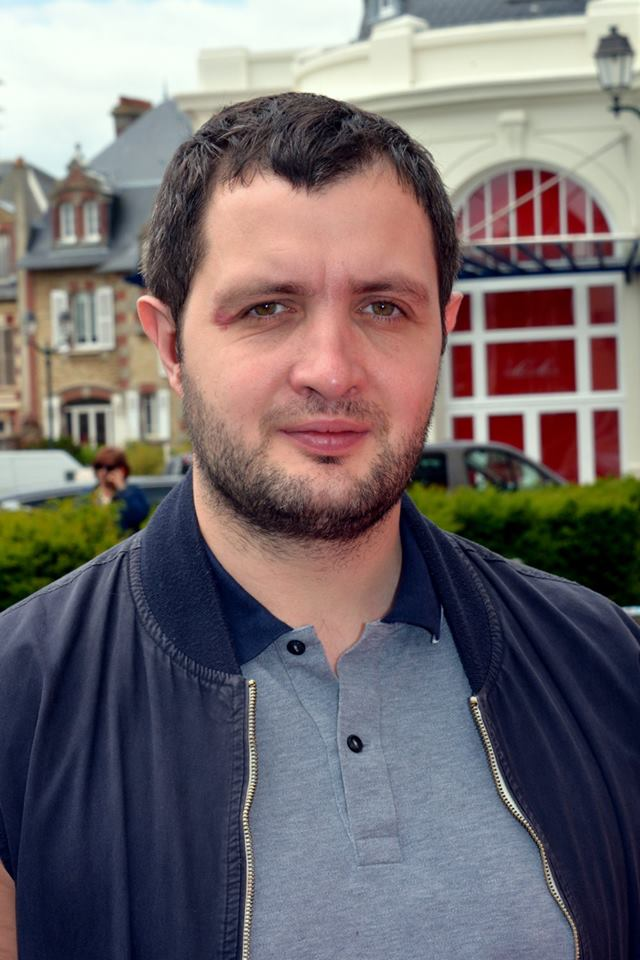
The main cast of La Bataille de Gaulle: Simon Abkarian, Simon Russell Beale, Anamaria Vartolomei, Niels Schneider, Mathieu Kassovitz, Thierry Lhermitte, Benoit Magimel, Noémie Schmidt, Campbell Scott, Pip Torrens, Loïc Corbery, Karim Leklou
- Simon Abkarian as Charles de Gaulle
- Niels Schneider as Philippe Leclerc de Hauteclocque
- Thierry Lhermitte as Henri Giraud
- Karim Leklou as Blazej
- Simon Russell Beale as Winston Churchill
- Campbell Scott as Franklin D. Roosevelt
- Benoît Magimel as Marie-Pierre Kœnig
- Félix Kysyl as Jean Moulin
- François Goeske as Klaus Barbie
- Kacey Mottet Klein as Geoffroy Chodron de Courcel
- Florian Lesieur as Fernand Bonnier de La Chapelle
- Anamaria Vartolomei as Livia
- Mathieu Kassovitz as Admiral François Darlan
- Pip Torrens as Bernard Montgomery
- Daniel Betts as Dwight D. Eisenhower
- Tom Mison as Anthony Eden
- Stephen Campbell Moore as Harold Macmillan
- Anthony Calf as Edward Spears
- Noémie Schmidt as Susan Travers
- Janis Ahern as Florence Conrad, founder of The Rochambelles
- Alice de Lencquesaing as Suzanne Torrès
- Loïc Corbery as René Pleven
- Pierre Aussedat as Georges Catroux
- Hugo Bariller as Professor Dressel (Fernand's teacher)
- Dan Kadosh as Gustavo Camerini
- Cédric Vieira as Michel Debré
- Sami Ameziane as Raymond Dronne
- Christophe Kourotchkine as Marcel Peyrouton
- Pablo Cobo as Colonel Passy
- Soufiane El Khalidy as a Bir Hakeim soldier
- Noam Morgensztern as Jean Monnet
- Alain Libolt as Maréchal Pétain
- Tom Neal as one of the AMGOT préfets

== Production ==
Charles de Gaulle during World War II, in 1942.

=== Development ===
A two-part film directed by Antonin Baudry about Charles de Gaulle was commissioned by Pathé in July 2021.

Pathé's president, Jérôme Seydoux, had been developing the project to dedicate a major historical epic to General de Gaulle and Free France for around twenty years. Aged six at the outbreak of the Second World War, he was deeply impacted by this period, particularly due to his father who was a prisoner of war. He wanted to bring this chapter of history to the screen without compromising on ambition—unlike other French films on the period—aligning with Pathé’s post-Covid strategy of producing grand French blockbusters (which also led to The Count of Monte Cristo in 2024 and The Three Musketeers two-part saga in 2023).

The film script is written by Antonin Baudry and his partner Bérénice Vila. They based it upon British author Julian Jackson's book, De Gaulle, une certaine idée de la France.

Antonin Baudry stated that this book changed his perspective on General de Gaulle and inspired him to bring his story to the screen:

When I was young, I was fascinated by De Gaulle […] but to me, he remained an iconic figure who wasn't particularly interesting to work on until I read Julian Jackson's book. That's when I encountered a cinematic character. […] Suddenly, I realized I had a chivalric figure who was both funny and tragic. For six years, I ate, slept, and dreamed with the general and his sidekicks, these modern-day knights.

In parallel, Antonin Baudry asked Jackson to serve as a historical consultant on the film, alongside French historian Géraud Létang.

The film was produced by Pathé in co-production with TF1 Films Production and Auvergne-Rhône-Alpes Cinéma. The film had a production budget of €74 million, becoming one of the most expensive French films of all time.

=== Casting ===
In August 2023, Simon Abkarian is confirmed to portray Charles De Gaulle in the both films. Antonin Baudry explained that he chose Simon Abkarian for the quality of his acting, both physical and verbal:

My co-author Bérénice Vila and I went a lot to the theater and the cinema while we were writing. We were observing people, and we quite quickly came across Simon Abkarian, whom I knew through a mutual friend. […] We choose him because of the quality of his acting—and it takes a great deal to embody a character like de Gaulle. Then, because of that glint of madness he can have in his eyes. And also because of his intelligence—something that radiates from the way he moves and speaks. […] That alchemy seemed just right to me.

Anamaria Vartolomei plays Livia, a character inspired by various French female resistance fighters.

To portray Churchill, Antonin Baudry called upon British actor Simon Russell Beale (who had previously played Churchill in the 2021 film Operation Mincemeat), whom he had known for several years:

I had spotted him in the film The Death of Stalin where he plays Lavrentiy Beria. In England, he is a theater actor who is considered the best actor of his generation. He is an extraordinary actor.

Although most of the characters are based on real people, Livia, played by Anamaria Vartolomei, is a fictional character inspired by several French Resistance heroines, such as Germaine Tillion, Lucie Aubrac, Berty Albrecht, and Danielle Casanova. Actress Anamaria Vartolomei notes that she initially knew little about these Resistance fighters, but her curiosity drove her to enrich her character with details from their respective lives:

I think the screenplay opened a door. I really wanted to learn more about the shadowy aspects the film explores, including female figures like Lucie Aubrac, Danielle Casanova, and other Resistance fighters whose names I only discovered later on. I enjoyed enriching my work on the film with their stories.

The character of Blazej, played by Karim Leklou, is also fictional. According to film's historical advisor Géraud Létang, the character is a reference to the demonized stereotype of Polish plumber, reinterpreted here to restore him a certain nobility. Blazej is also inspired by the character of Sancho Panza, Don Quixote's squire and companion. Conceived by Bérénice Vila, his role is to bring some innocence and enthusiasm to counterbalance the idealistic and Don Quixotic nature of the de Gaulle character created by Antonin Baudry.

=== Filming ===
The avenues leading to the Arc de Triomphe were blocked off during the filming of the November 11, 1940 demonstration scene.

Filming on the first chapter took place in the summer of 2023 with Pierre Cottereau and Giora Bejach as cinematographers. It began with shooting in Paris. Filming locations included Place du Panthéon and Gare de l'Est and around the Hôtel de Ville station in July and August 2023, and Le Marais area of Paris in September 2023.

As producer Axelle Boucaï explained, filming in Paris had to take place in 2023 without fail, otherwise it would have to be postponed by two years, as the 2024 Summer Olympics would have made any shooting in the capital's iconic landmarks impossible :

We couldn't push back the filming start date because the Olympic Games were happening the following summer. […] So if shooting didn't take place that summer, it would potentially delay filming by two years, to 2025.

Shooting the November 11, 1940 demonstration scene required completely closing Place Charles-de-Gaulle (formerly Place de l'Étoile). That is why the decision was made to film it on August 15, when traffic and crowds are at their lowest.

Filming then moved to Normandy and Morocco, where it took place from October to November 2023

Period London was recreated at the Bry-sur-Marne studios for a shoot running from February to March 2024. Filming then resumed from June to July 2024, following a three-month break. The final scene takes place on a recreated Moroccan terrace in front of a blue screen in Bry-sur-Marne.

Filming on the second-part was completed by July 2024.

=== Musical score ===
The musical score for the first chapter, De Gaulle: Résistance, was composed by Volker Bertelmann who won an Oscar in 2023 for All Quiet on the Western Front. The musical score for the second chapter, De Gaulle: Liberté, was composed by Théo Cascio, marking his very first score for a feature film.

== Release ==
The two-parts were initially subtitled Tilting Iron and Sovereign Edge, respectively. But were later retitled for the international market as Résistance and Liberté, respectively.

=== Release in France ===
The first part of the film, Résistance, premiered at the 2026 Cannes Film Festival on 20 May and was followed by its theatrical release on 3 June 2026. The second part, Liberté, was planned for release on 3 July the same year but was finally moved to June 26.

=== Release in other countries ===
In the United Kingdom and Ireland, the first part of the film, Résistance, was released on 28 August 2026. The second part, Liberté, was released on 18 September 2026.

In Canada, the first part of the film was released 14 August 2026 and the second part 11 September 2026.

In Germany, the first part, named De Gaulle – Zeit des Widerstands, is planned for release on 4 February 2027.

It will be presented in the Grand public section of the 21st Rome Film Festival in October 2026.

Samuel Goldwyn Films released the duology in the United States on November 6, 2026, and December 4, 2026 respectively.

== Reception ==
=== Box office in France ===
The first part's performance at the French box office was characterized by an unusually slow start followed by a sustained increase in attendance, a trajectory widely attributed to strong word of mouth.

==== A sluggish start ====
L'Âge de fer sold approximately 380,000 tickets during its first week in France, a result regarded as disappointing in relation to the scale and cost of the two-film production. Attendance then declined by approximately 40 percent during its second week, initially leading several French media outlets to question whether the expensive production would become a commercial failure.

==== Increase during the heatwave ====
The trend reversed during the first part's third week, when admissions increased by around 17 percent rather than continuing the normal decline of a theatrical release. Its performance accelerated further during its fourth weekend: Boxoffice Pro reported 324,000 admissions over the weekend, an increase of 68 percent despite the film being shown in 22 percent fewer screenings. Le Monde described the reversal as an exceptional box-office phenomenon, citing word of mouth alongside the contemporary heatwave, which encouraged attendance at air-conditioned cinemas.

==== A success driven by word of mouth and younger audience ====
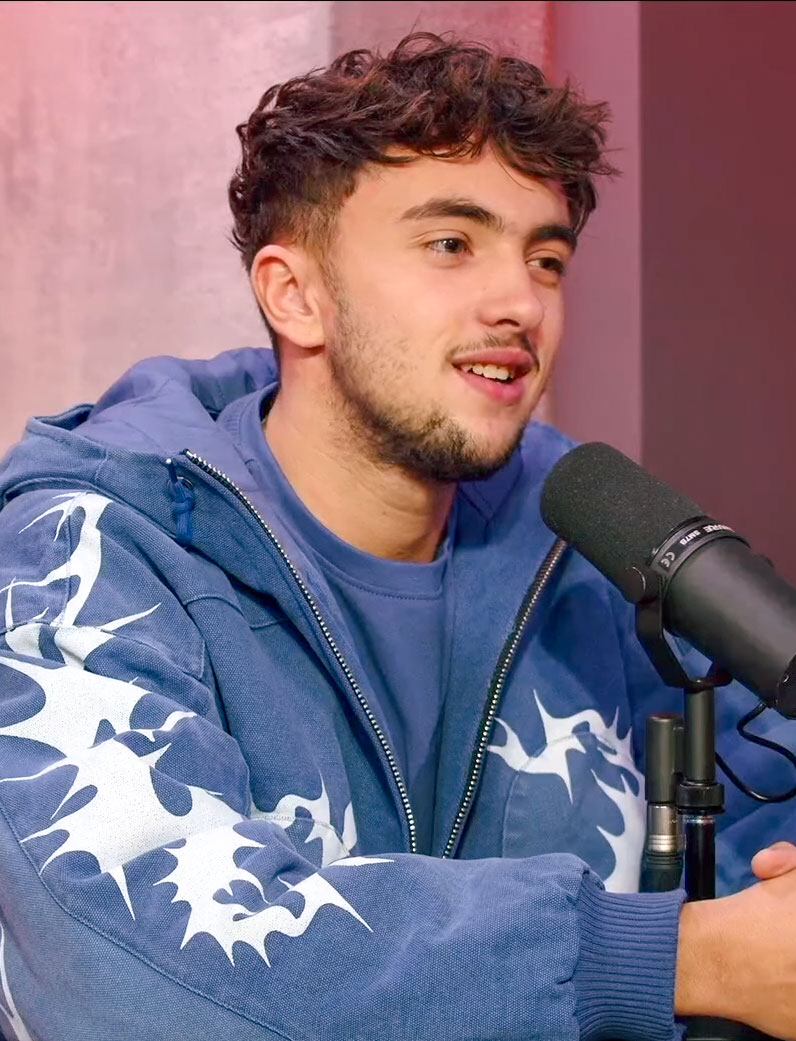
French YouTuber Inoxtag hosted screenings of the film and Q&A sessions with the director.

The growing momentum led Pathé to advance the French release of the second part, J'écris ton nom, from 3 July to 26 June in order to coincide with the annual Fête du cinéma, during which participating cinemas offered reduced ticket prices. The second film consequently entered cinemas while attendance for the first was still increasing and recorded around 400,000 admissions during its first week, surpassing the opening of L'Âge de fer.

Contemporary coverage identified favorable word of mouth as a major factor in the attendance reversal. Pathé Films president Ardavan Safaee stated that the distributor first observed the positive audience response translating into increased admissions during the first part's third week. The distributor subsequently intensified promotion on social media and partnered with French YouTuber Inoxtag, who organized screenings and discussions with Baudry intended to introduce the film to younger viewers. The Guardian later described the diptych as a surprise success among younger French audiences and reported that Pathé's audience research found the theme of resistance to have resonated particularly strongly with younger viewers.

==== Steady attendance throughout the summer ====
The two parts continued to maintain comparatively strong attendance throughout July and August. By 20 August, the diptych had passed five million combined admissions in France, making it the most-attended French film project of the summer at that point. On 23 August, Pathé reported that L'Âge de fer had exceeded 2.7 million admissions and J'écris ton nom 2.2 million, describing the result as a long-running success following the first part's initially modest opening and an enthusiastic word-of-mouth response.

=== Box office in other countries ===
In the United Kingdom and Ireland, the first film grossed over £100,000 during its opening weekend.

In Quebec, both films were distributed in about thirty theaters and also enjoyed significant success. The first film grossed $857,000 just over a month after its release, becoming the most popular French film of the year. Meanwhile, the second film accumulated 500,000 Canadian dollars in box office revenue two weeks after its release.

=== Critical response ===
The two films received generally positive reviews from the French press, with the second part receiving a somewhat stronger critical response. On AlloCiné, which standardizes reviews from French publications onto a five-star scale, L'Âge de fer received an average press rating of 3.5 out of 5 based on 38 reviews, while J'écris ton nom received 3.9 out of 5 based on 28 reviews.

Jacques Mandelbaum of Le Monde gave both parts the newspaper's "À voir" ("Must-see") recommendation. Reviewing the first film, he described Baudry's intention as creating a large-scale popular spectacle combining war, action, politics, humour and lyricism, and considered that the director had succeeded in doing so. He similarly recommended J'écris ton nom, highlighting its multiple narrative strands involving de Gaulle, Leclerc, Jean Moulin and Henri Giraud, while noting the film's strongly heroic and lyrical treatment of its principal characters.

International reviews of the first part were also generally favorable, although several critics regarded its approach as conventional. On review aggregator Rotten Tomatoes, first part holds an approval rating of 94% based on 18 reviews, with an average rating of 7.7/10. Metacritic, which uses a weighted average, assigned the film a score of 73 out of 100, based on 4 critics, indicating "generally favorable reviews".

Tomris Laffly of Variety described Résistance as a large-scale, traditional but consistently engaging wartime biopic, praising its old-fashioned blockbuster qualities while considering its 160-minute running time excessive. Dave Calhoun of Screen Daily was more mixed, praising the accessibility of the historical narrative and the energy of the action sequences, while criticizing the film as broad-brush, old-fashioned and lacking in subtlety. Upon its British release, Peter Bradshaw of The Guardian described the film as an enjoyable and eventful biopic, particularly praising Simon Abkarian's portrayal of de Gaulle and Simon Russell Beale's performance as Winston Churchill, as well as the humorous dynamic between the two characters.
