= Anthracite (TV series) =

French television series

- Promotional release poster
- Also known as: Anthracite: Le mystère de la secte des Écrins
- Genre: Thriller
- Created by: Fanny Robert; Maxime Berthemy
- Directed by: Julius Berg
- Starring: Hatik; Noémie Schmidt; Camille Lou
- Music by: Judson Crane; David Quattrini
- Country of origin: France
- Original language: French
- No. of seasons: 1
- No. of episodes: 6

Production
- Running time: 46–53 minutes
- Production companies: Anthracite Productions; White Lions Film

Original release
- Network: Netflix
- Release: 10 April 2024

Anthracite (French: Anthracite: Le mystère de la secte des Écrins) is a six part French television series, created by Fanny Robert and Maxime Berthemy and released on 10 April 2024, on Netflix. Included in its cast are the rapper Hatik, Noémie Schmidt, and Camille Lou. It is loosely based on the Order of the Solar Temple, a group which was tied to several mass suicides. It is not a direct recreation of the Solar Temple story, as the group and people depicted are all wholly fictional.

The series received mixed reviews, with praise for the scenic appeal of its settings and mystery, but criticism over its plot and storytelling. Anthracite was Netflix's first "ecologically sensitive" production, with the production involving an "eco-referrent" who measured the climate impact of the series, and with a portion of the carbon cost being donated by Netflix.

== Synopsis ==
When journalist Solal Heilman disappears in Lévionna, a fictional small town in the French Alps, his daughter Ida sets out to find him. She travels to the town, where she meets ex-convict Jaro. The two investigate, revealing secrets linked to a cult which was active in Lévionna thirty years earlier, in 1994.

== Cast and characters ==
- Hatik: Jaro Gatsi
- Camille Lou: Giovanna DeLuca, a police officer
- Noémie Schmidt: Ida Heilman, "websleuth"
- Masha Billy: Malia Gatsi, Jaro's daughter
- Nicolas Godart: Romeo DeLuca, Giovanna's brother
- Isabelle Candelier: Carmela DeLuca, Giovanna and Romeo's mother
- Raphaël Ferret: Erwan Le Floch
- Basile Violette: Titouan Le Floch, Giovanna and Erwan's son
- Jean-Marc Barr: Solal Heilman, Ida's father, investigative journalist
- Stefano Cassetti: Caleb Johansson, leader of the sect
- Kad Merad: Claude Chevallier, Jaro's uncle
- Romane de Stabenrath: Juliette Chevallier, Jaro's mother
- Florence Muller: Marie Chevallier, Claude's wife
- Marianne Basler: Valérie Faure
- Roxane Arnal: young Valérie Faure
- Vincent Rottiers: Vincent
- Léo Legrand: Hari Faure, doctor and Romeo's boyfriend
- Bernard Blancan: Denis Monnier
- Anaïs Parello: Anaïs Aymard
- Ludmilla Makowski: Emma Marçais, murder victim
- Étienne Diallo: Sofiane Klaus
- Séverine Vincent: La Detraz
- Apollonia Luisetti: young La Detraz

== Episodes ==
No.	Title	Original release date
1	"Still on Fire" (French: Les flammes brûlent encore)	10 April 2024
2	"The 13th Disciple" (French: Le 13^{e} Disciple)	10 April 2024
3	"Trust No One" (French: Tu ne peux faire confiance à personne)	10 April 2024
4	"Levia Borelis" (French: Levia Borelis)	10 April 2024
5	"A Darker Shadow" (French: Une ombre plus noire encore)	10 April 2024
6	"The Point of Equilibrium" (French: L'Équilibre du monde)	10 April 2024

== Background and production ==
Anthracite was Netflix's first "ecologically sensitive" production, with the production involving an "eco-referrent" who measured the climate impact of the series, and with 1% of the carbon cost being donated by Netflix to environmental groups. The series was released 10 April 2024 on Netflix. The creators of the series were Fanny Robert and Maxime Berthemy, while it was directed by Julius Berg.

It is loosely based on the case of the Order of the Solar Temple, responsible for the December 1995 massacre in Isère, as well as several other mass suicides that killed 74 people in total throughout the 1990s. It is not a direct recreation: the cult named is fictional, the series is set in a fictional village instead of the real location, and the characters are wholly fictional. Robert said the case had deeply affected her when she was a teenager, telling a journalist that:

I must have been thirteen or fourteen at the time, and I remember it was on TV all the time. I remember it scared me a lot, scared everyone a lot. You can't imagine that something like that exists just a few miles from your home.

== Reception ==
On the review aggregator website Rotten Tomatoes, 67% of 6 critics' reviews are positive, with an average rating of 6.3/10. Stephanie Morgan, writing for Common Sense Media, criticized the series and rated it two stars out of five, arguing its dialogue was poor, as was the storytelling overall with "jarring portrayals of violence and dark themes [that] overshadow any potential for a compelling mystery". Several reviews praised the visual appeal of the mountainous setting.

Cécile Lecoultre, writing for the Swiss newspaper 24 heures, criticized the series as confused and cliché. Lecoultre said its similarities to the Solar Temple case were "anecdotal" outside of "morbidly trashy sequences" revolving around the rituals of the group, and said one should go to works like La Fraternité, Les Mystères sanglants de l'OTS, and Shock Waves instead if one wanted to focus on the Solar Temple. Joel Keller writing for Decider tentatively recommended the series, criticizing what he called its "tonal quirkiness" but praising its mystery. He said its tone was odd and torn between being "a cult-based murder thriller" or "a sometimes silly treatise on how effective web sleuths can be".
