= Hatik =

French rapper and actor

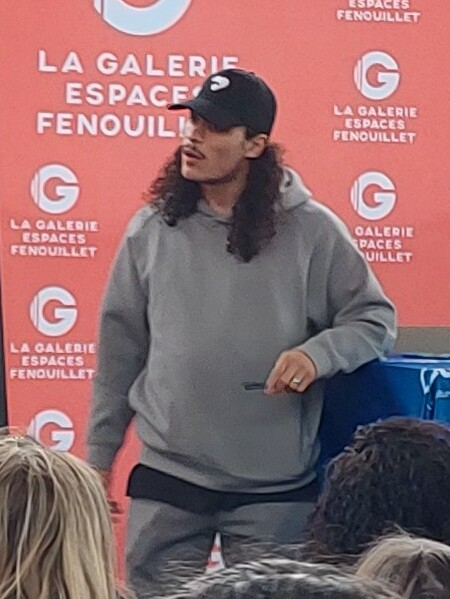
Hatik in 2023

Clément Daniel Maxime Penhoat (French: [klemɑ̃ danjɛl maksim pɛnɔa], [pɛnwa]; born November 26, 1992, in Chevreuse), better known by his stage name Hatik, is a French rapper and actor from Guyancourt, Yvelines.

He was known for his musical project Chaise pliante starting 2018. His biggest hit to date is "Angela". In 2020 he obtained a leading role of Apash in the French TV series Validé broadcast on Canal+.

== Discography ==
=== Albums / Mixtapes ===
Title	Year	Peak positions		
Title	Year	FRA	BEL (Wa)	SWI
America 2 - Connaissance et style	2014	—	—	—
Chaise pliante	2019	1	53	—
Chaise pliante II	2019	—	—	—
Vague à l'âme	2021	3	13	35
Niyya	2023	7	77	—
+1	2024	—	115	—

=== EPs ===
- 2017: Par le pire
- 2019: Projet Berlin (with Daymolition) (Low Wood)

=== Singles ===
Title	Year	Peak positions			Album
Title	Year	FRA	BEL (Wa)	SWI	Album
"Angela"	2020	1	9	67	Chaise pilante
"Ali"	2020	76	—	—	Chaise pilante (Edition Deluxe)
"1-2-3" (with Amel Bent)	2020	8	3	—	
"Waï"	2021	65	—	—	
"Paradise" (with Sam's)	2021	195	—	—	

=== Featured in ===
Title	Year	Peak positions		Album
Title	Year	FRA	BEL (Wa)	Album
"Unité" (Dadju - Hatik - Soolking - Imen Es)	2020	59		Non-album release
"Jusqu'au bout" (Alrima feat. Hatik)	2020	36		Non-album release

=== Other songs ===
Title	Year	Peak positions		Album
Title	Year	FRA	BEL (Wa)	Album
"Buena noche"	2020	131	—	Non-album singles
"Dans la fusée"	2020	164	—	Non-album singles
"Prison pour mineurs"	2020	6	13* (Ultratip)	Validé (soundtrack)
"FLK (Fais les kiffer)" (with Sam's)	2020	32	—	Validé (soundtrack)
"Adieu, mon amour"	2020	64	—	Validé (soundtrack)
"Le meilleur" (feat. Jok'Air)	2020	22	—	Non-album single
"Plus riche" (featuring Sofiane)	2020	60	—	Chaise pliante
"Sanstitre."	2020	156	—	Non-album singles
"Crashtest"	2020	82	—	Non-album singles
"Mer"	2020	27	—	Non-album singles
"À la mélanie"	2021	54	—	Vague à l'âme
"Ma p'tite étoile"	2021	45	—	Vague à l'âme
"Rappelle moi" (feat. Kalash)	2021	138	—	Vague à l'âme
"Toute la vie"	2021	147	—	Vague à l'âme
"Éternel"	2021	154	—	Vague à l'âme
"Habibi"	2021	183	—	Vague à l'âme
"Vide" (feat. Laylow)	2021	189	—	Vague à l'âme
"Attrape mon cœur"	2021	194	—	Vague à l'âme
"Colère"	2021	197	—	Vague à l'âme

*Did not appear in the official Belgian Ultratop 50 charts, but rather in the bubbling under Ultratip charts.

== Filmography ==
- 2020: Validé as Clément / Apash (TV series)
- 2024: Anthracite (TV series) as Jaro (Netflix mini-series)
