= Radin! =

Radin !
- Theatrical release poster
- Directed by: Fred Cavayé
- Screenplay by: Laurent Turner; Nicolas Cuche; Fred Cavayé
- Based on: an original idea by Olivier Dazat
- Produced by: Éric Jehelmann; Philippe Rousselet
- Starring: Dany Boon; Laurence Arné; Noémie Schmidt; Patrick Ridremont
- Cinematography: Laurent Dailland
- Edited by: Yann Malcor
- Music by: Klaus Badelt
- Production companies: Jerico; TF1 Films Production; Mars Films
- Distributed by: Mars Films
- Release dates: 2 September 2016 (Paris premiere); 28 September 2016 (France)
- Running time: 89 minutes
- Country: France
- Language: French
- Box office: $22 million

Radin! is a 2016 French comedy film directed by Fred Cavayé. It stars Dany Boon, Laurence Arné, Noémie Schmidt and Patrick Ridremont.

== Cast ==
- Dany Boon as François Gautier
- Laurence Arné as Valérie
- Noémie Schmidt as Laura
- Patrick Ridremont as Cédric
- Christophe Canard as Gilles
- Christophe Favre as Demeester
- Karina Marimon as Carole
- Sébastien Chabal as himself

== Release ==
Radin! was released in France on 28 September 2016, where it topped the box office during its opening week with 1,002,709 entries.

== Reception ==
The Hollywood Reporter found that the film provided "a handful of decent laughs" but it "ultimately runs out of comic steam about midway through" and that "the third-act twist that makes it all happen is one of the easiest, lamest screenwriting tools in the book."
