= Marie-Pierre Kœnig =

French general (1898–1970)

Marshal Marie-Pierre Kœnig (Koenig)
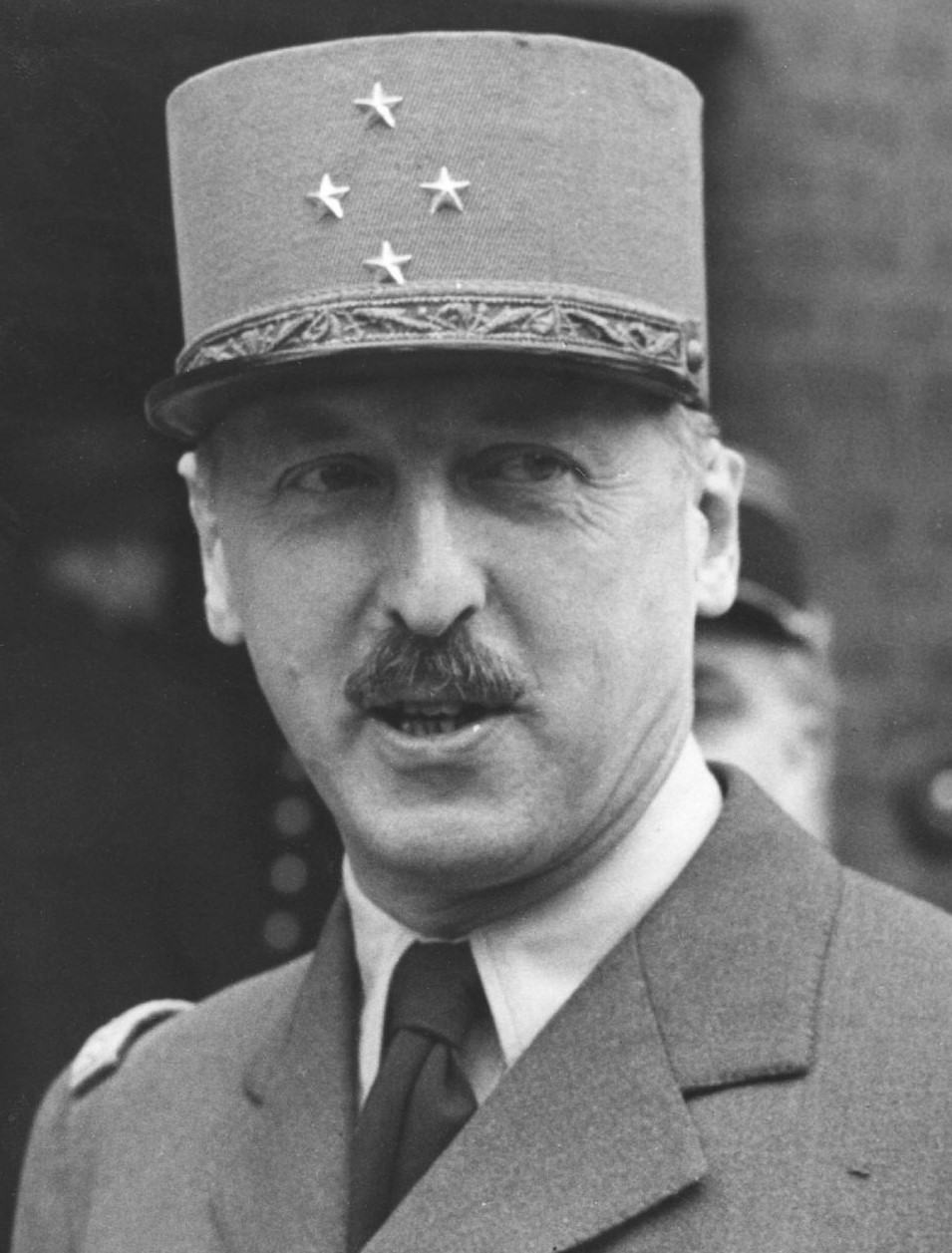
- General Kœnig in 1944

Minister of National Defence and the Armed Forces
- In office 23 February 1955 – 6 October 1955
- Prime Minister: Edgar Faure
- Preceded by: Maurice Bourgès-Maunoury
- Succeeded by: Pierre Billotte
- In office 19 June 1954 – 14 August 1954
- Prime Minister: Pierre Mendès France
- Preceded by: René Pleven
- Succeeded by: Emmanuel Temple

Member of the National Assembly
- In office 5 July 1951 – 5 December 1958
- Constituency: Bas-Rhin

Personal details
- Born: Marie Joseph Pierre François Kœnig; 10 October 1898 Caen, French Republic
- Died: 2 September 1970 (aged 71) Neuilly-sur-Seine, French Republic
- Resting place: Montmartre Cemetery
- Party: RPF (1951–1955); RS (1956–1958)
- Spouse: Marie Klein (m. 1931)
- Parents: Henri Joseph Kœnig (father); Ernestine Mutin (mother)
- Education: Lycée Malherbe
- Nickname: Mutin

Military service
- Allegiance: Third Republic; Free France; Fourth Republic
- Branch/service: French Army: Infantry; Foreign Legion
- Years of service: 1917–1951
- Rank: Army general (Note: Marshal of France is a dignity and not a rank)
- Unit: List of units: 36th Infantry Regiment; 15th Chasseurs Battalion; 38th Infantry Division; 51st Infantry Regiment; 4th Foreign Infantry Regiment; 2nd Tirailleurs Regiment; 13th Demi-Brigade of Foreign Legion
- Commands: List of commands: 1st Free French Brigade; French Forces of the Interior
- Battles/wars: See list: World War I; German spring offensive; Hundred Days Offensive; World War II; Battle of France; Battle of Dakar; Syria–Lebanon Campaign; Battle of Bir Hakeim; Second Battle of El Alamein

Marie Joseph Pierre François Kœnig (Note: French pronunciation: [maʁi pjɛʁ køniɡ]) (also Pierre Kœnig or Koenig; 10 October 1898 – 2 September 1970) was a French general who most notably commanded a Free French brigade at the Battle of Bir Hakeim in North Africa in 1942. The battle was a heroic show of strength, as the Free French held their position for 2 weeks and 2 days despite being outnumbered ten to one.

After the war he was made military governor of the French occupation zone in Germany (1945–1949) before starting a political career. He served twice as Minister of National Defence and the Armed Forces in the 1950s. He was posthumously elevated to the position of Marshal of France in 1984, being the last titleholder to date.

== Early life ==
Marie-Pierre Kœnig was born on 10 October 1898, in Caen, Calvados, France. His parents were from the Alsace region.

== Military career ==
=== World War I ===
Kœnig fought in the French Army during World War I and served with distinction. He obtained his baccalaureate and enlisted in 1917. He served in the 36th Infantry Regiment. He was designated as an aspirant in February 1918 and joined his unit at the front. Decorated with the Médaille militaire, he was promoted to sous-lieutenant on 3 September 1918.

=== Interwar career ===
After the war, he served with French forces in Morocco and Cameroon. He served in Silesia as an assistant (French: adjoint) of Captain Adrien Henry in the Alps, in Germany, and in Morocco at the general staff headquarters of the division of Marrakesh.

=== World War II ===
Kœnig was a captain and assistant to Lieutenant-Colonel Raoul Magrin-Vernerey in the 13th Demi-Brigade of Foreign Legion of the French Foreign Legion.

When World War II broke out, Captain Kœnig returned to France. In the Spring of 1940, he was a member of the French expeditionary force in Norway for which he was later awarded Norway's Krigskorset med Sverd, or the War Cross with Sword, in 1942. After the fall of France, he escaped to England from Brittany.

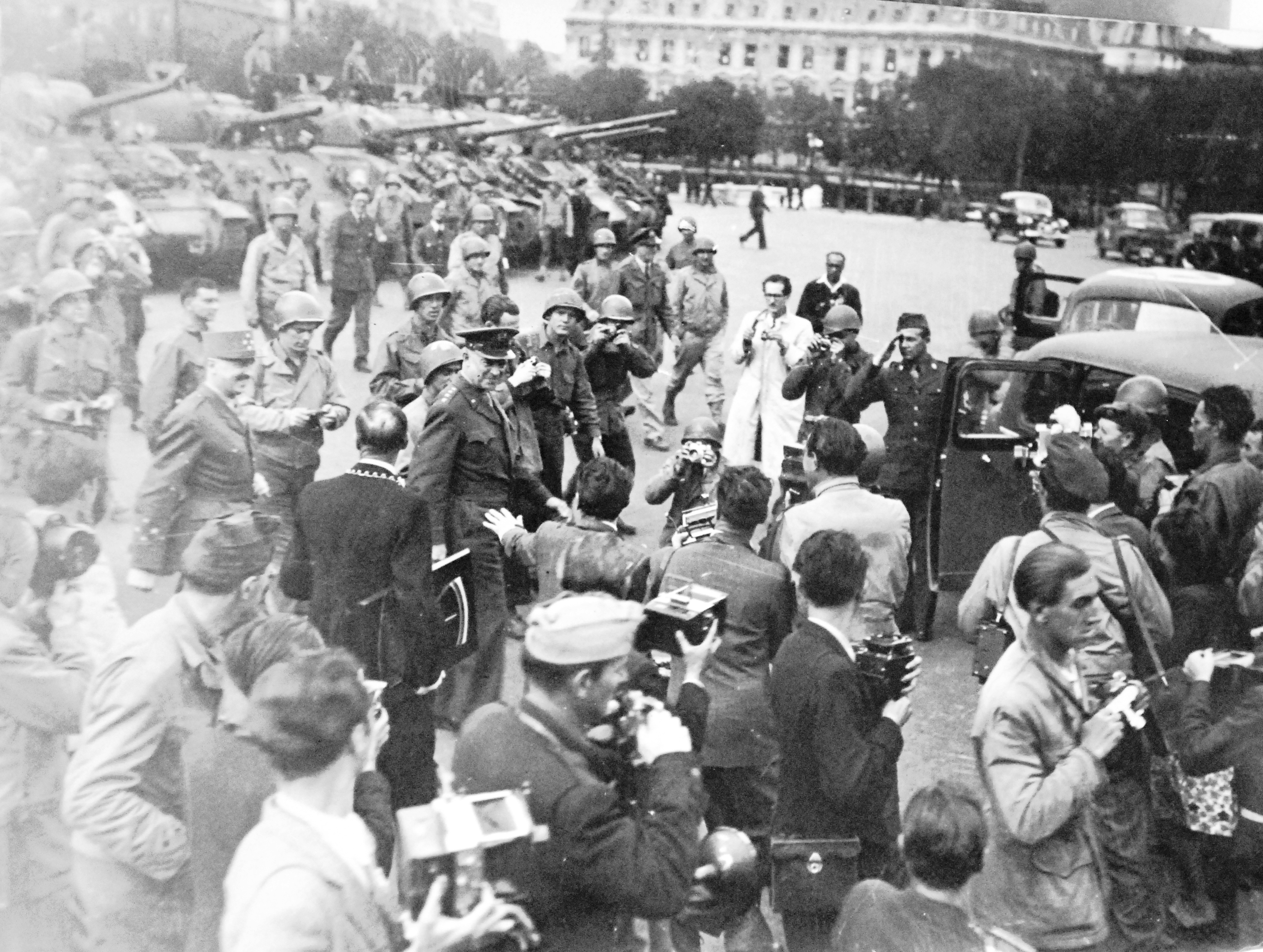
Liberation of Paris, France, 25 August 1944. General Dwight D. Eisenhower leaving Hotel de Ville, behind him is French General Marie-Pierre Koenig. In the background are tanks of the Division Leclerc.

In London, Kœnig joined General Charles de Gaulle and was promoted to colonel. He became chief of staff in the first divisions of the Free French Forces. In 1941, he served in the campaigns in Syria and Lebanon. He was later promoted to general and took command of the First French Brigade in Egypt. His unit of 3700 men held ground against five Axis divisions (c. 37,000 men) for 16 days at the Battle of Bir Hakeim until they were ordered to evacuate on 11 June 1942. De Gaulle said to Kœnig, "Know and tell your troops that all of France is watching you and that you are its pride."

Later, Kœnig served as the Free French delegate to the Allied headquarters under General Dwight D. Eisenhower. In 1944, he was given command of the Free French who participated in the Invasion of Normandy. Kœnig also served as a military advisor to de Gaulle. In June 1944, he was given command of the French Forces of the Interior (FFI) to unify the various French Resistance groups under de Gaulle's control. Under his command, the FFI abandoned ranged battle in the maquis and preferred sabotage that was waged in support of the invading army. Important during D-Day, the FFI had a role that became decisive in the battle for Normandy and in the landing in Provence of the US Seventh Army and French Army B.

On 21 August 1944, de Gaulle appointed Kœnig military governor of Paris to restore law and order. In 1945, he was sent to arrest Marshal Philippe Pétain, who had taken refuge in Germany but gave himself up at the frontier with Switzerland.

=== Cold War ===
After the war, Kœnig was the military governor of the French occupation zone in Germany from 1945 to 1949. In 1949, he became inspector general in North Africa, and in 1950, he became the vice-president of the Supreme War Council.

== Political career ==
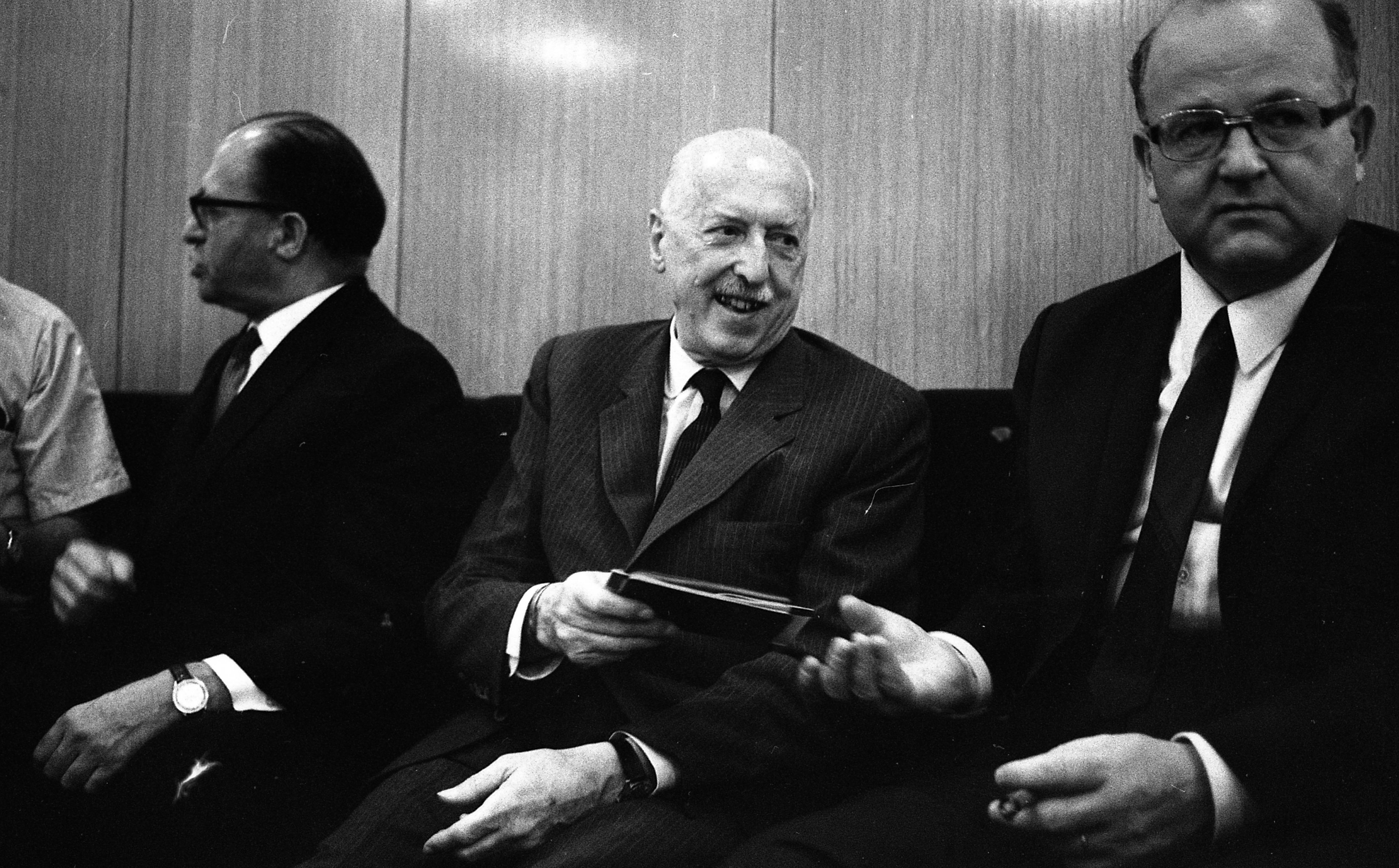
Kœnig during a visit in Israel, 1969

In 1951, after his retirement from the army, Kœnig was elected as Gaullist representative to the French National Assembly and briefly served as Minister of Defense under Pierre Mendès-France (1954) and Edgar Faure (1955).

He gave his strong support to the new State of Israel as president of the Franco-Israeli Committee (Comité franco-israélien), at around the same time when he was France's Defense Minister, as shown from his informing Shimon Peres, then serving as Director-General of the Israeli Ministry of Defense, that France was willing to sell Israel any weapons it wished to purchase, from small arms to tanks (such as the AMX-13 light tank). Kœnig had witnessed the heroism of a battalion of Palestinian Jewish mine layers during the Battle of Bir Hakeim and afterwards allowed them to fly their own Star-of-David flag, against British regulations.

== Death ==
Kœnig died on 2 September 1970, in Neuilly-sur-Seine, and was buried at Montmartre Cemetery, in Paris.

== Legacy ==
There are streets named after Kœnig in Jerusalem, Netanya and Haifa.

== Cultural depictions ==
In the first part of the historical film De Gaulle: Résistance, directed by Antonin Baudry, Kœnig is portrayed by French actor Benoît Magimel.

The film focuses in particular on the Battle of Bir Hakeim, during which Koenig’s Free French Forces, despite being outnumbered, held their ground for 13 days against German armored forces.

== Military ranks ==
Aspirant	Second lieutenant	Lieutenant	Captain	Battalion chief	Lieutenant colonel
February 1918	3 September 1918	3 September 1920	25 June 1932	1 July 1940	December 1940
Colonel	Brigade general	Division general	Corps general	Army general	Marshal of France
January 1941	July 1941	1943	28 June 1944	20 May 1946	6 June 1984 Posthumous

== Honours and decorations ==
=== National honours ===
Ribbon bar	Honour
	Grand Cross of the National Order of the Legion of Honour
	Companion of the National Order of Liberation

=== Ministerial honours ===
Ribbon bar	Honour
	Commander of the Order of Agricultural Merit

=== Decorations and medals ===
Ribbon bar	Honour
	Military medal
	War Cross 1914–1918 (2 citations)
	War Cross 1939–1945 (4 citations)
	War Cross for foreign operational theatres (3 citations)
	Resistance Medal with rosette
	Colonial Medal with clasps "Maroc", "Sahara", "Libye", "Bir-Hakeim", "Tunisie 43-43"
	Combatant's Cross
	Aeronautical Medal
	Escapees' Medal
	1914–1918 Inter-Allied Victory medal
	1914–1918 Commemorative war medal
	1939–1945 Commemorative war medal
	Commemorative medal for voluntary service in Free France
	Medal of French Gratitude

=== Foreign honours ===
Ribbon bar	Honour	Country
	Companion of the Order of the Bath	United Kingdom
	Distinguished Service Order	United Kingdom
	Commander of the Legion of Merit	United States
	Congressional Gold Medal	United States
	Order of Suvorov, 1st Class	Soviet Union
	Grand Cross of the Order of the Crown with palm	Belgium
	Grand Officer of the Order of Leopold	Belgium
	War Cross with Palm	Belgium
	Grand Cross of the Order of Orange-Nassau	Netherlands
	War Cross	Luxembourg
	Grand Cross of the Order of the Oak Crown	Luxembourg
	Grand Cross of the Order of the Dannebrog	Denmark
	Grand Cross of the Order of St. Olav	Norway
	War Cross with Sword	Norway
	Commander's Cross of the Order of Virtuti Militari	Poland
	Resistance Medal with rosette	Poland
	War Cross	Czechoslovakia
	Order of the White Lion for Victory	Czechoslovakia
	Grand Cross of the Order of George I	Greece
	Grand Cross of the Order of Saint Charles	Monaco
	Grand Cross of the Knights of Malta	Malta
	Sherifian Order of Military Merit	Morocco
	Grand Cordon of the Order of Ouissam Alaouite	Morocco
	Grand Cordon of the Nichan Iftikar	Tunisia
	Grand Officer of the Order of the Star of Anjouan	Comoros
	Grand Cross of the Order of the White Elephant	Thailand

== See also ==
- Susan Travers
- Works by Jean Fréour: Sculptor of Kœnig memorial
