= Paris Is Us =

- Directed by: Laurent Slama
- Written by: Rémi Bassaler; Paul Saïsset; Souliman Schelfout; Laurent Slama
- Starring: Noémie Schmidt; Grégoire Isvarine; Marie Mottet
- Distributed by: Netflix
- Release date: 22 February 2019 (Worldwide)
- Running time: 83 minutes
- Country: France
- Language: French

Paris Is Us (French: Paris est à nous) is a 2019 French drama feature film directed by Laurent Slama.

== Plot ==
A year after Anna and Greg meet at a party, Greg decides to move to Barcelona to take up a job as an air traffic controller. He wants Anna to come with him but she initially refuses. Greg is unhappy with her lack of ambition, while she is satisfied with her job as a waitress in Paris. Anna finally decides to join Greg in Barcelona but she misses her plane and later learns that it has crashed. Having so nearly avoided death, Anna goes into a tailspin and loses track of reality and the present. As her relationship falls apart, Paris becomes a mirror of her distress.

== Cast ==
- Noémie Schmidt as Anna
- Grégoire Isvarine as Greg
- Marie Mottet
- Lou Castel
- Alexandre Schreiber
- Margaux Bonin
- Julia Kouakou
- Mathias Minne
- Clément Olivieri
- Theo Tagand

== Production ==
The film was funded through Kickstarter, before it was picked up by Netflix.

== Release ==
The film was released by Netflix internationally on 22 February 2019.

== Reception ==
On review aggregator Rotten Tomatoes, the film holds an approval rating of 43%, based on seven reviews, with an average rating of 6.8/10.
