= The Au Pair (TV series) =

British television series

- Screenplay by: Michael Foott; Andy Bayliss
- Directed by: Oonagh Kearney
- Starring: David Suchet; Sally Bretton; Ludmilla Makowski; Kenny Doughty
- Music by: Kieran Kiely
- Countries of origin: United Kingdom; France; Ireland
- Original language: English
- No. of series: 1
- No. of episodes: 4

Production
- Cinematography: Evan Barry
- Editor: Eoin McGuirk
- Production company: Pernel Media

Original release
- Network: Channel 5
- Release: 10 March – 13 March 2025

The Au Pair is a 2025 four-part British television crime drama thriller series starring Sally Bretton, Ludmilla Makowski and David Suchet. It was broadcast in the United Kingdom on Channel 5 from 10 March 2025.

== Premise ==
A business woman with a picture-perfect house and step-family hires an au pair after her diabetic father moves in next door.

== Cast ==
- David Suchet as George
- Sally Bretton as Zoe Dalton
- Ludmilla Makowski as Sandrine
- Kenny Doughty as Chris Dalton
- Virginie Ledoyen as Marie

== Production ==
The series is written by Michael Foott and Andy Bayliss and was commissioned by Channel 5 in June 2024. It is directed by Oonagh Kearney. It is produced by Pernel Media and is their first English-language scripted series. Filming took place in the Republic of Ireland with Irish co-producers MK1 Studios. ITV Studios has the worldwide distribution rights for the four-part series with Canal+ Group holding the rights in France. Filming took place in the Republic of Ireland in July 2024.

The cast is led by David Suchet and includes Sally Bretton and Kenny Doughty, as well as French actresses Virginie Ledoyen and Ludmilla Makowski.

== Release ==
The series was shown in the United Kingdom on Channel 5 from 10 March 2025.

== Reception ==
Anita Singh writing in The Daily Telegraph awarded the show three stars and described it as "the kind of mile-a-minute, OTT thriller in which 25 outlandish things happen in the first episode" and compared the series to the 1990s thriller The Hand That Rocks the Cradle and labelled it "the sort of schlocky mindless fun that makes you binge the lot".

Ed Power for the i (newspaper) said that the series will "will warm the cockles of cosy crime aficionados" describing it as a "emotionally gory guilty pleasure stumbling into the parlour with a dagger poking, Cluedo-style, out of its back".

In January 2026, Oonagh Kearney was nominated at the Irish Film & Television Awards for best director.
