= Ludmilla Makowski =

French actress

Ludmilla Makowski is a French actress, singer and film director, best known to international audiences for playing the role of young Claire Laurent in the Netflix series Lupin.

== Career ==
Makowski had her breakthrough acting role in 2021 when she was cast as the teenaged version of Claire Laurent (played as an adult by Ludivine Sagnier) in the hit Netflix series Lupin.

In 2022, she directed a short film Où les marguerites poussent ("Where Daisies Grow") in Thouars, Western France. The film went on to be shown during the Directors' Fortnight at the Cannes Film Festival, and at the Venice Film Festival.

In 2023, she sang as a contestant on the French reality singing competition show The Voice – La plus belle voix. In March 2023, she appeared in the French television series Les Siffleurs. In 2024, she could be seen in Netflix series Anthracite. That year, she was cast in The Au Pair alongside David Suchet and Virginie Ledoyen.

== Filmography ==
Year	Title	Role	Type	Notes
2021–present	Lupin	young Claire Laurent	series	7 episodes
2021	Les particules élémentaires	Annabelle	miniseries	
2022	Mouton Noir	Lyssa	short film	
2023	The Voice – La plus belle voix	Herself	reality television show	
2023	Les Siffleurs	Lila	miniseries	2 episodes
2023	Bardot	Stephane	miniseries	2 episodes
2023	Où les marguerites poussent		short film	director
2024	Anthracite	Emma	miniseries	2 episodes
2024	On Trial	Adele	television film	
2025	The Au Pair	Sandrine	series	
