= Susan Travers =

British nurse and ambulance driver (1909–2003)

- Born: Susan Mary Gillian Travers; 23 September 1909; Kensington, London, England
- Died: 18 December 2003 (aged 94); Ballainvilliers, Île-de-France, France
- Spouse: Nicolas Schlegelmilch
- Children: 2
- Military career
- Allegiance: France
- Branch: French Army
- Service years: 1940–1948
- Rank: Adjudant-chef
- Unit: French Foreign Legion
- Conflicts: World War II: Battle of Bir Hakeim; First Indochina War
- Awards: Chevalier de la Légion d'honneur Croix de Guerre 1939–1945; Médaille coloniale Officier de l'Ordre du Nichan Iftikhar; Médaille militaire

Susan Mary Gillian Travers (23 September 1909 – 18 December 2003) was a British nurse and ambulance driver who served in the French Red Cross during the Second World War. She later became the only woman to be enlisted in the French Foreign Legion, having also served in French Indochina, during the First Indochina War. She was decorated multiple times for her bravery.

== Early life ==
Travers was born in Kensington and spent her early years in England, the daughter of Francis Eaton Travers, a Royal Navy Admiral, and his wife Eleanor Catherine (née Turnbull).

== World War II ==
At the outbreak of the Second World War, Travers joined the French Red Cross as a nurse. Later, she became an ambulance driver with the French Expeditionary Force in Finland in 1940. After the fall of France, she went to London and joined the Free French under Charles de Gaulle. In 1941, she drove a medical doctor of the 1st Free French Division during Operation Exporter in Syria and Lebanon, during which the Allied forces invaded and seized Syria and Lebanon from the Vichy French. She served in the 13th Demi-Brigade of the Foreign Legion as a driver for the medical officer, where she gained the nickname "La Miss".

The 13th Demi-Brigade was incorporated into the 1st Brigade of the 1st Free French Division, commanded by Colonel Marie-Pierre Kœnig. Travers was assigned as the driver to Kœnig. They became lovers.

In May 1942, the 1st Free French Brigade was posted at Bir Hakeim, the southern end of the British Eighth Army's line at Gazala in Libya. As the Panzer Army Africa prepared to attack the British line, Kœnig ordered all women out of the area. The Axis forces attacked on 26 May, initiating the Battle of Gazala. Four German and Italian divisions attacked Bir Hakeim. Not long after, Travers joined a convoy into the rear area, and Kœnig allowed her to return to Bir Hakeim, as it seemed the Axis attack had failed. During the next two weeks, the Axis continued to attack, heavily shelling and bombing Bir Hakeim. During the bombardment, a shell tore off the roof of Kœnig's car. Travers, aided by a Vietnamese driver, fixed it on the spot immediately.

During the night of 10–11 June, 1st FF Brigade evacuated Bir Hakeim, with Travers driving Kœnig's staff car. The column ran into minefields and German machine gun fire. Kœnig ordered Travers to drive at the front of the column. Travers stated:

He said, "We have to get in front. If we go the rest will follow." It is a delightful feeling, going as fast as you can in the dark. My main concern was that the engine would stall.

At 10:30 a.m. on 11 June, the column entered British lines. Travers's vehicle had eleven bullet holes, with a shock absorber destroyed and the brakes unserviceable.

Kœnig was promoted to general and left the North African theatre for higher command and a reunion with his wife. Travers, driving a self-propelled anti-tank gun, remained with the French Foreign Legion. She later served in the Italian Campaign and the Western Front (in France and Germany), during which she was wounded when she drove over a land mine.

== Post-war ==
After the war, her military status was regularized. She applied to and was formally enrolled in the Légion Étrangère, as an adjudant-chef.

Travers served in Indochina. She married Legion Adjudant-Chef Nicolas Schlegelmilch, who had fought at Bir Hakeim with the 13th Demi-Brigade. In retirement, they lived on the outskirts of Paris. The couple is survived by two sons.

She waited for all the other principals in her life story to die before writing her autobiography. In 2000, aged 91, assisted by Wendy Holden, she wrote her autobiography, Tomorrow to Be Brave: A Memoir of the Only Woman Ever to Serve in the French Foreign Legion (ISBN 0552148148).

== Cultural depictions ==
In the first part of the historical film De Gaulle : Résistance, directed by Antonin Baudry, Susan Travers is portrayed by Swiss actress Noémie Schmidt.

The film depicts the course of the Battle of Bir Hakeim, as well as the evacuation of the Free French Forces during the night of June 10–11, 1942. The film shows how Susan Travers, driving General Kœnig’s vehicle, forces her way through German lines under a relentless barrage of fire, before reaching the British army.

== Decorations ==
- Légion d'honneur
- Croix de Guerre
- Médaille commémorative 1939–1945 with clasp – "Afrique" – "Italie" – "Libération"
- Médaille Coloniale, du mérite syrien de 4e classe
- Croix de libération finlandaise
- Officier de l'Ordre du Nichan Iftikhar
- Médaille militaire
