= Noémie Schmidt =

Swiss actress (born 1990)

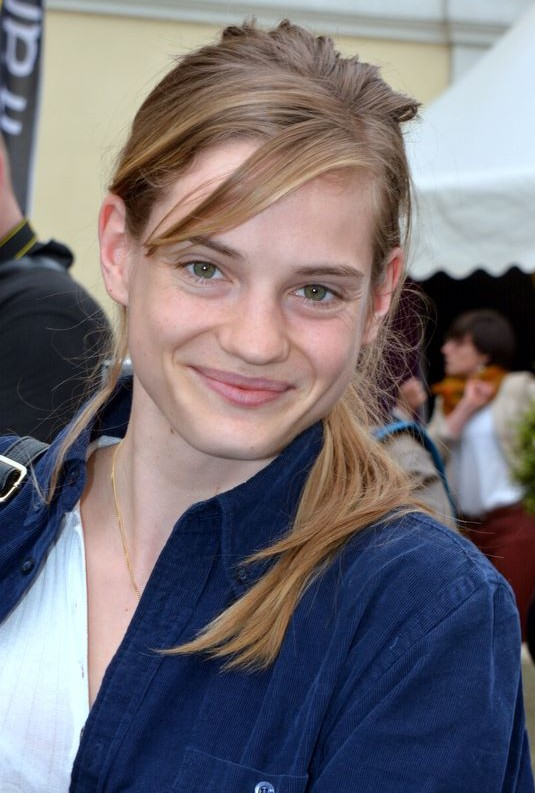
- Schmidt in 2016 at the Cabourg Film Festival
- Born: 18 November 1990 (age 35); Switzerland
- Occupation: Actress
- Years active: 2012–present

Noémie Schmidt (born 30 November 1990) is a Swiss actress, most notable for her television and film work, including Henrietta of England in Versailles (2015–2017). Her role in The Student and Mister Henri (2015) won her the Prix Premiers Rendez-vous (Best Newcomer) at the 2016 Cabourg Film Festival and a nomination for the César Award for Most Promising Actress the same year.

Her other work includes For This Is My Body (2015) and Radin! (2016) and the television films Daddy's Little Girl (2014) and Le premier été (2014).

== Early life and education ==
Noémie Schmidt was born in Switzerland on 30 November 1990. (Note: some sources state YOB as 1991.) She became interested in performing at an early age.

From 2004 to 2008 she sang in the choir of the Schola de Sion (in Valais, Switzerland), developing her vocal technique and training in classical singing. After a trip to the United States, she moved to Brussels, where she studied theatre at the Lassaad International School of Theatre, and gave singing lessons to children at the Théâtre Royal de la Monnaie.

== Career ==
Schmidt made her screen debut in 2012, in a short film by Ewa Brykalska entitled Coda. Her performance was praised and she won several prizes in festivals dedicated to short films. Noticed for her talent, she turned to television in 2013 with Toi que j'aimais tant by Mary Higgins Clark, followed by Le premier été of Marion Sarraut, in 2014.

In 2014 she made her cinema debut in the feature film La Fille sûre by Victor Emmanuel Boinem. She then won the title role of The Student and Mister Henri, in 2015, alongside Claude Brasseur. The film earned her a nomination for the César Award for Most Promising Actress, and won her the Prix Premiers Rendez-vous (Best Newcomer) at the 2016 Cabourg Film Festival. That same year, she portrayed Henrietta of England in the series Versailles (2015-) on Canal+.

In 2016, she starred in the French comedy film Radin! by Fred Cavayé, alongside Dany Boon, Laurence Arné, and Patrick Ridremont.

She starred alongside Thierry Godard in the 2020 telemovie Copy Cat (Faux-semblants), an award-winning film directed by Akim Isker.

== Filmography ==
=== Film ===
Schmidt has starred in a number of films, including:

- 2012 : Coda, short film by Ewa Brykalska : la fille
- 2013 : Dolça, short film by Laure Bourdon Zarader : Dolça
- 2014 : Julia, short film by Maud Neve and Nora Burlet : Élise
- 2014 : Locanda, short film by Lucas Pannatier : Lily
- 2014 : La Vie devant soi by Victor-Emmanuel Boinem : Charlotte
- 2015 : The Student and Mister Henri by Ivan Calbérac : Constance Piponnier
- 2016 : Radin! by Fred Cavayé : Laura
- 2016 : For this is my body by Paule Muret
- 2018 : The Awakening of Motti Wolkenbruch : Laura
- 2019 : Paris Is Us : Anna
- 2026 : De Gaulle : Susan Travers

=== Television ===
Television appearances include:

- 2013 : Toi que j'aimais tant by Olivier Langlois : Pauline
- 2014 : Le premier été by Marion Sarraut : Angélique adolescente
- 2015 : Versailles, series by Simon Mirren and David Wolstencroft : Henrietta of England
- 2016 : La llum d'Elna by Sílvia Quer : Élisabeth Eidenbenz
- 2018 : À l'intérieur, series by Bruno Dega and Jeanne Le Guillou : Angèle Maury
- 2024 : Anthracite : Ida Heilman

=== Theatre ===
- 2003 : Ubu roi : la mère Ubu

== Awards ==
- 2013 : special mention by the jury at the Festival Premiers Plans d'Angers for Coda
- 2013 : female performance award at the Un festival c'est trop court ! (Festival européen du court métrage de Nice) for Coda
- 2013 : female performance award at the Festival Côté court de Pantin for Coda
- 2016 : prize for best newcomer at the Cabourg Film Festival for L'Étudiante et Monsieur Henri
