= The Student and Mister Henri =

- Film poster
- Directed by: Ivan Calbérac
- Screenplay by: Ivan Calbérac
- Based on: the play L'Étudiante et Monsieur Henri by Ivan Calbérac
- Produced by: Éric Altmayer; Nicolas Altmayer; Isabelle Grellat
- Starring: Claude Brasseur; Guillaume de Tonquedec; Noémie Schmidt; Frédérique Bel
- Cinematography: Vincent Mathias
- Edited by: Véronique Parnet
- Music by: Laurent Aknin
- Production companies: Mandarin Cinéma; StudioCanal; France 2 Cinéma; Les Belles Histoires Productions
- Distributed by: StudioCanal
- Release dates: 27 August 2015 (Angoulême); 7 October 2015 (France)
- Running time: 98 minutes
- Country: France
- Language: French
- Box office: $5.4 million

The Student and Mister Henri (original title: L'Étudiante et Monsieur Henri) is a 2015 French comedy-drama film written and directed by Ivan Calbérac and based on Calbérac's 2012 play of the same name. It stars Claude Brasseur, Guillaume de Tonquedec, Noémie Schmidt and Frédérique Bel.

Noémie Schmidt won the Prix Premiers Rendez-vous (Best Newcomer) at the 2016 Cabourg Film Festival.

== Cast ==
- Claude Brasseur as Henri Voizot
- Guillaume de Tonquédec as Paul Voizot
- Noémie Schmidt as Constance Piponnier
- Frédérique Bel as Valérie Voizot
- Thomas Solivéres as Matthieu
- Valérie Kéruzoré as Constance's mother
- Stéphan Wojtowicz as Constance's father
- Antoine Glémain as Constance's brother
- Grégori Baquet as Arthur
- Pierre Cassignard

== Reception ==
On review aggregator website Rotten Tomatoes, The Student and Mister Henri has an approval rating of 70% based on 10 reviews, with an average rating of 5.50/10.
