= Julian Jackson (historian) =

British historian (born 1954)

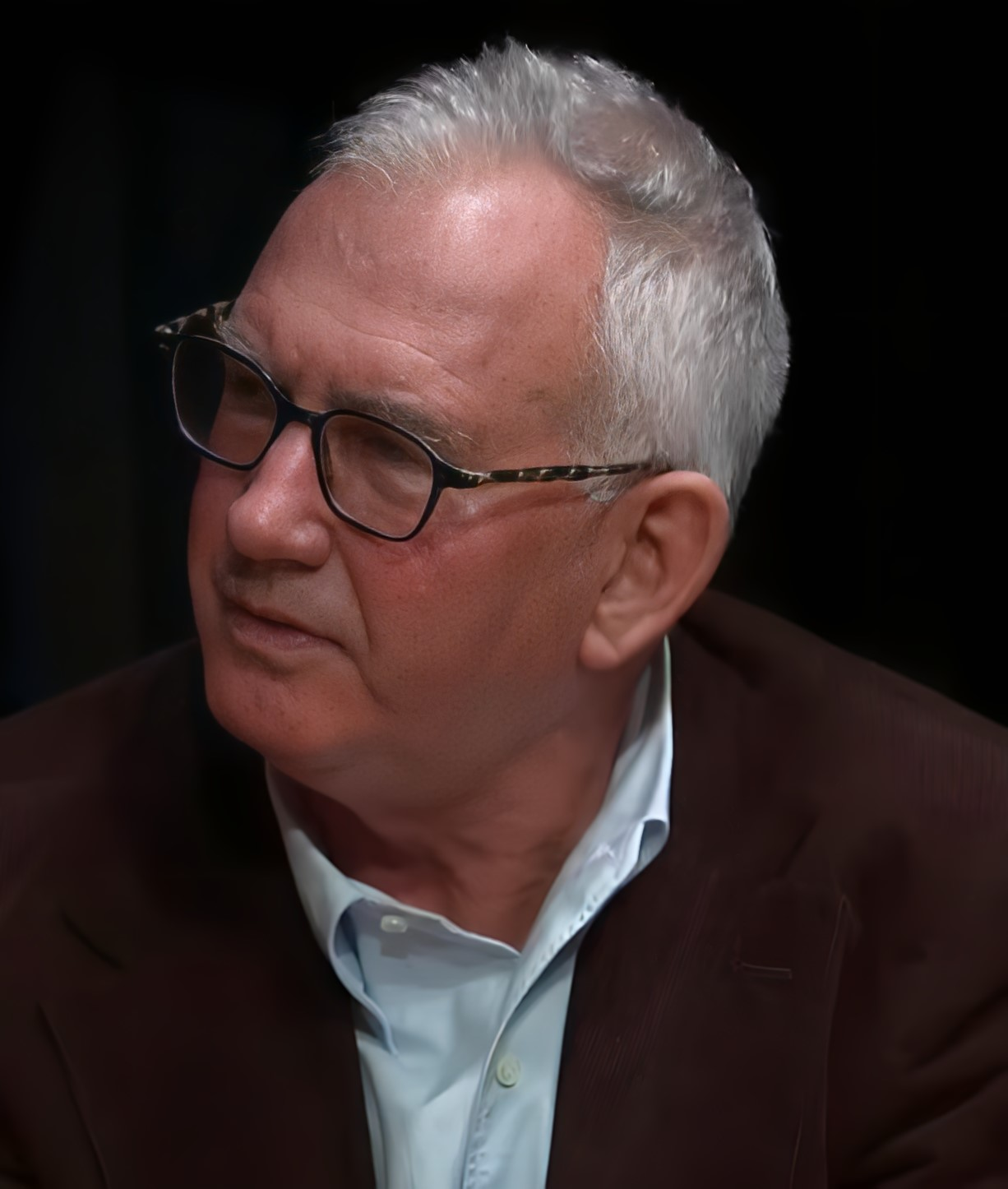
Jackson in 2024

Julian Timothy Jackson FRHistS (born 10 April 1954) is a British historian and academic. He is professor of history at Queen Mary University of London, and is one of the leading authorities on twentieth-century France.

== Biography ==
He was educated at Peterhouse, Cambridge, where he obtained his doctorate in 1982 with a thesis on the Great Depression in France, supervised by Professor Christopher Andrew. After many years spent at the University of Wales, Swansea, he joined the Queen Mary History Department in 2003.

Jackson’s first two books were about the 1930s crisis in France. The Politics of Depression France 1932–1936 (Cambridge University Press, 1985) was a study of economic policy-making in France during the Depression and more generally of the Depression's impact on French politics. The Popular Front in France: Defending Democracy 1934–1938 (Cambridge: Cambridge University Press, 1988), a history of the Popular Front, encompassed its political, social and cultural dimensions.

In more recent years, Jackson’s research interests have moved on to the period after 1940. In 2001, he published an extensive synthesis of France under the Occupation entitled France: The Dark Years 1940–1944 (Oxford University Press: 2001), which was short-listed for the Los Angeles Times Book Prize for History.

Jackson’s other books include The Fall of France (2003) and De Gaulle (2018), and he edited The Short Oxford History of Europe 1900–1945 (Oxford: Oxford University Press, 2002). The Fall of France was one of the winners of the Wolfson History Prize for 2004. His 2009 book Living in Arcadia is a study of homosexual politics in France after 1945.

Jackson's work has had considerable impact in France, where he is regarded, in the words of Le Monde, as "one of the best historians of the French twentieth century". The French translation of The Dark Years — La France sous l’Occupation, 1940-1944 (Flammarion, 2004) — was singled out for a special mention by the jury of the Prix Philippe Viannay—Défense de la France. The French translation of The Life of Charles de Gaulle — De Gaulle : une certaine idée de la France (Seuil, 2019) — won the Grand Prix de la Biographie politique du Touquet in 2021.

He has twice won the Duff Cooper Prize: for 2018's A Certain Idea of France: The Life of Charles De Gaulle and for 2023's France on Trial: The Case of Marshal Pétain.

He is an elected Fellow of the British Academy (FBA), and a Fellow of the Royal Historical Society (FRHistS).

His partner is Douglas, an interior designer.

== Bibliography ==
- The Politics of Depression in France 1932–1936 (Cambridge University Press, 1985).
- The Popular Front in France: Defending Democracy 1934-1938 (Cambridge University Press, 1988).
- France: the Dark Years 1940-1944 (Oxford University Press, 2001).
- The Fall of France (Oxford University Press, 2003).
- Living in Arcadia. Homosexuality, Politics and Morality in France from the Liberation to Aids (University of Chicago, Press 2009).
- La Grande Illusion (BFI Publications, 2009).
- May 68: Rethinking France's Last Revolution (eds. Julian Jackson, Anna-Louise Milne, James S. Williams, Palgrave Macmillan, 2011).
- A Certain Idea of France: The Life of Charles de Gaulle (Allen Lane, 2018).
  Known simply as De Gaulle in the U.S. (The Belknap Press of Harvard University Press, 2018).
  Jackson's first sketch of the French leader was in the pocketbook De Gaulle (Haus, 2003).
- France on Trial: The Case of Marshal Pétain (Allen Lane, 2023).
