= Charles de Gaulle =

French general and statesman (1890–1970)

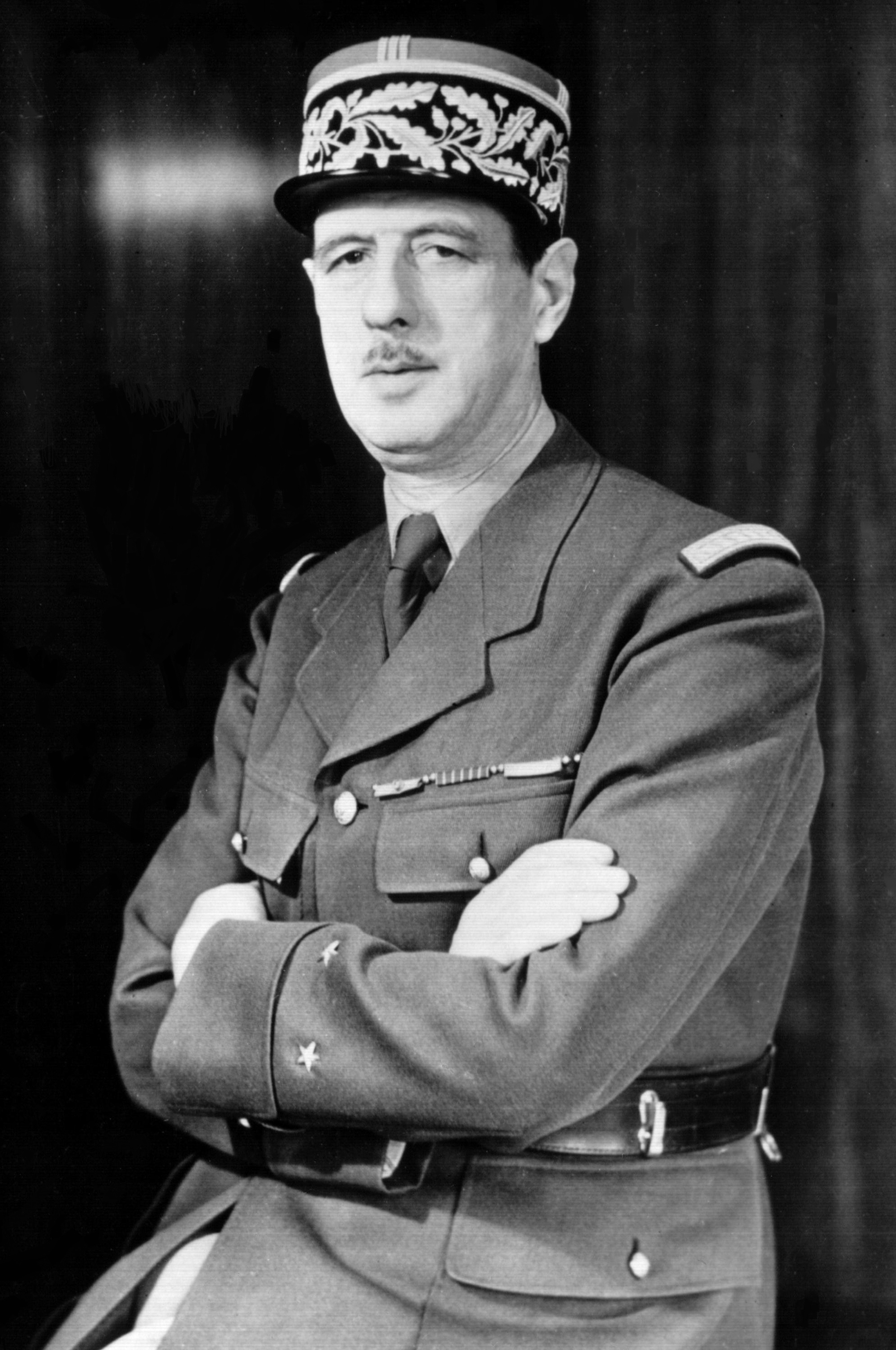
- De Gaulle in uniform, 1942

President of France
- In office 8 January 1959 – 28 April 1969
- Prime Minister: Michel Debré; Georges Pompidou; Maurice Couve de Murville
- Preceded by: René Coty
- Succeeded by: Alain Poher (acting) Georges Pompidou (Note: Alain Poher served as acting president from de Gaulle's resignation until Pompidou took office.)

Prime Minister of France
- In office 1 June 1958 – 8 January 1959
- President: René Coty
- Preceded by: Pierre Pflimlin
- Succeeded by: Michel Debré

Chairman of the Provisional Government of the French Republic
- In office 3 June 1944 – 26 January 1946
- Preceded by: De facto: Philippe Pétain (Chief of the French State); Pierre Laval (Chief of the Government)
- Succeeded by: Félix Gouin

Chairman of the French Committee of National Liberation
- In office 3 June 1943 – 3 June 1944 Serving with Henri Giraud (3 June 1943 – 9 November 1943)
- Preceded by: Himself as Chairman of the French National Committee
- Succeeded by: Position abolished

Chairman of the French National Committee
- In office 24 September 1941 – 3 June 1943
- Preceded by: Himself as Head of the Empire Defence Council
- Succeeded by: Henri Giraud and himself as co-Chairmen of the French Committee of National Liberation

Head of the Empire Defence Council
- In office 27 October 1940 – 24 September 1941
- Preceded by: Position created
- Succeeded by: Himself as Chairman of the French National Committee

Minister of Defence of France
- In office 1 June 1958 – 8 January 1959
- President: René Coty
- Prime Minister: Himself
- Preceded by: Pierre de Chevigné
- Succeeded by: Pierre Guillaumat

Minister of Algerian Affairs
- In office 12 June 1958 – 8 January 1959
- President: René Coty
- Prime Minister: Himself
- Preceded by: André Mutter
- Succeeded by: Louis Joxe

Undersecretary of State for War and National Defence of France
- In office 6 June 1940 – 16 June 1940
- President: Albert Lebrun
- Prime Minister: Paul Reynaud
- Minister of War: Paul Reynaud
- Preceded by: Hippolyte Ducos
- Succeeded by: Position abolished

Personal details
- Born: Charles André Joseph Marie de Gaulle; 22 November 1890 Lille, France
- Died: 9 November 1970 (aged 79) Colombey-les-Deux-Églises, France
- Party: Union of Democrats for the Republic (1967–1969)
- Other political affiliations: Union for the New Republic (1958–1967); Rally of the French People (1947–1955)
- Spouse: Yvonne Vendroux (m. 1921)
- Children: 3, including Philippe and Anne
- Relatives: Charles de Gaulle (uncle); Geneviève de Gaulle-Anthonioz (niece); Alain de Boissieu (son-in-law)
- Education: École spéciale militaire de Saint-Cyr

Military service
- Allegiance: French Third Republic; Free France; French Fifth Republic
- Branch/service: French Army; Free French Forces
- Years of service: 1912–1944
- Rank: Général de brigade
- Commands: List: 19e bataillon de chasseurs à pied; 507e régiment de chars de combat; 4e Division cuirassée; Free France
- Battles/wars: List: World War I; Battle of Dinant (WIA); First Battle of Champagne (WIA); Battle of Verdun (POW); Polish–Soviet War; World War II; Battle of France; Battle of Montcornet; Battle of Abbeville; Battle of Dakar; Battle of Gabon; Liberation of Paris

Charles André Joseph Marie de Gaulle (Note: English: /də ˈɡoʊl, də ˈɡɔːl/ də GOHL, də GAWL, French: [ʃaʁl(ə) də ɡol]. Also known by other names.) (22 November 1890 – 9 November 1970) was a French general and statesman who led the Free French Forces against Nazi Germany and its puppet state of Vichy France in World War II and chaired the Provisional Government of the French Republic from 1944 to 1946 to restore democracy in France. Following the 1958 Algiers putsch, he came out of retirement at the request of President René Coty, who appointed him Prime Minister. He commissioned a new 1958 French constitution which was approved by voters in a swift majority, during a referendum, establishing the French Fifth Republic. He was subsequently elected the President of France later that year, a position he held until his resignation in 1969.

Born in Lille, he was a decorated officer of World War I, wounded several times and was taken prisoner of war by the German Empire. During the 1918–1939 interwar period, he advocated mobile armoured divisions. During the German invasion of May 1940, he led an armoured division that counterattacked the Nazi German invaders; he was then appointed Undersecretary for War. Refusing to accept his government's armistice with Germany, de Gaulle fled to Britain and exhorted the French to continue the fight in his Appeal of 18 June. He led the Free French Forces and later headed the French National Liberation Committee and emerged as the undisputed leader of Free France. He became head of the Provisional Government of the French Republic in June 1944, the interim government of France following its liberation. As early as 1944, de Gaulle introduced a dirigiste economic policy, which included substantial state-directed control over a capitalist economy, which was followed by 30 years of unprecedented growth, known as the Trente Glorieuses. He resigned in 1946, but continued to be politically active as founder of the Rally of the French People. He retired in the early 1950s and wrote his War Memoirs, which became a staple of modern French literature.

When the Algerian War threatened to bring the unstable French Fourth Republic to collapse, the National Assembly brought him back to power during the May 1958 crisis. He founded the French Fifth Republic with a strong presidency; he was elected with 78% of the vote to continue in that role. He managed to keep France together while taking steps to end the war, much to the anger of the pieds-noirs (ethnic French and other Europeans born and raised in Algeria) and the French Armed Forces. He oversaw the independence to Algeria, alongside most of France's other colonies in Africa. In the context of the Cold War, de Gaulle initiated his "politics of grandeur", asserting that France as a major power should not rely on other countries, such as the United States, for its national security and prosperity. To this end, he pursued a policy of "national independence" which led him to withdraw from NATO's integrated military command and to launch an independent nuclear strike force, which made France the world's fourth nuclear power. He restored the France–Germany relations with Chancellor Konrad Adenauer to create a European counterweight between the Anglo-American and Soviet Union spheres of influence through the signing of the Élysée Treaty on 22 January 1963.

De Gaulle opposed any development of a supranational Europe, favouring Europe as a continent of sovereign nations. He also openly criticised the US intervention in Vietnam and the exorbitant privilege of the US dollar. In his later years, his use of the slogan "Vive le Québec libre" at a speech in Montreal, Canada and his two vetoes over Great Britain's entry into the European Economic Community generated considerable controversy in both the Americas and Europe. Although he was reelected to the presidency in 1965, he faced widespread protests by students and workers in May 68; however, he had the French Army's support and won the 1968 early elections with an increased majority in the National Assembly. De Gaulle resigned in late April 1969 after losing a referendum in which he proposed more decentralization. He died a year and a half later at the age of 79, leaving his presidential memoirs unfinished. French political parties and leaders claim a Gaullist legacy; streets and monuments in France and other parts of the world were dedicated in honour of him after his death, such as the Paris Charles de Gaulle Airport in Paris, France.

== Early life ==
=== Childhood and origins ===
Charles André Joseph Marie de Gaulle was born on 22 November 1890 in Lille, the third of five children. He was raised in a devoutly Roman Catholic, conservative, and monarchist family. His father, Henri de Gaulle, was a professor of history and literature at a Jesuit college and eventually founded his own school.

Henri de Gaulle came from a long line of parliamentary gentry from Normandy and Burgundy. The name "de Gaulle" is thought to be Dutch in origin, and may have derived from van der Walle, de Walle ("from the rampart, defensive wall"), or de Waal ("the wall"). De Gaulle's mother, Jeanne (born Maillot), descended from a family of wealthy entrepreneurs from Lille. She had French, Irish, Scottish, and German ancestry.

De Gaulle's father encouraged historical and philosophical debate between his children and through his encouragement, de Gaulle learned French history from an early age. Struck by his mother's tales of how she cried as a child when she heard of the French capitulation to the Germans at Sedan in 1870, he developed a keen interest in military strategy. He was also influenced by his uncle, also named Charles de Gaulle, who was a historian and passionate Celticist who advocated the union of the Welsh, Scots, Irish, and Bretons into one people. His grandfather Julien-Philippe was also a historian, and his grandmother Joséphine-Marie wrote poems which impassioned his Christian faith.

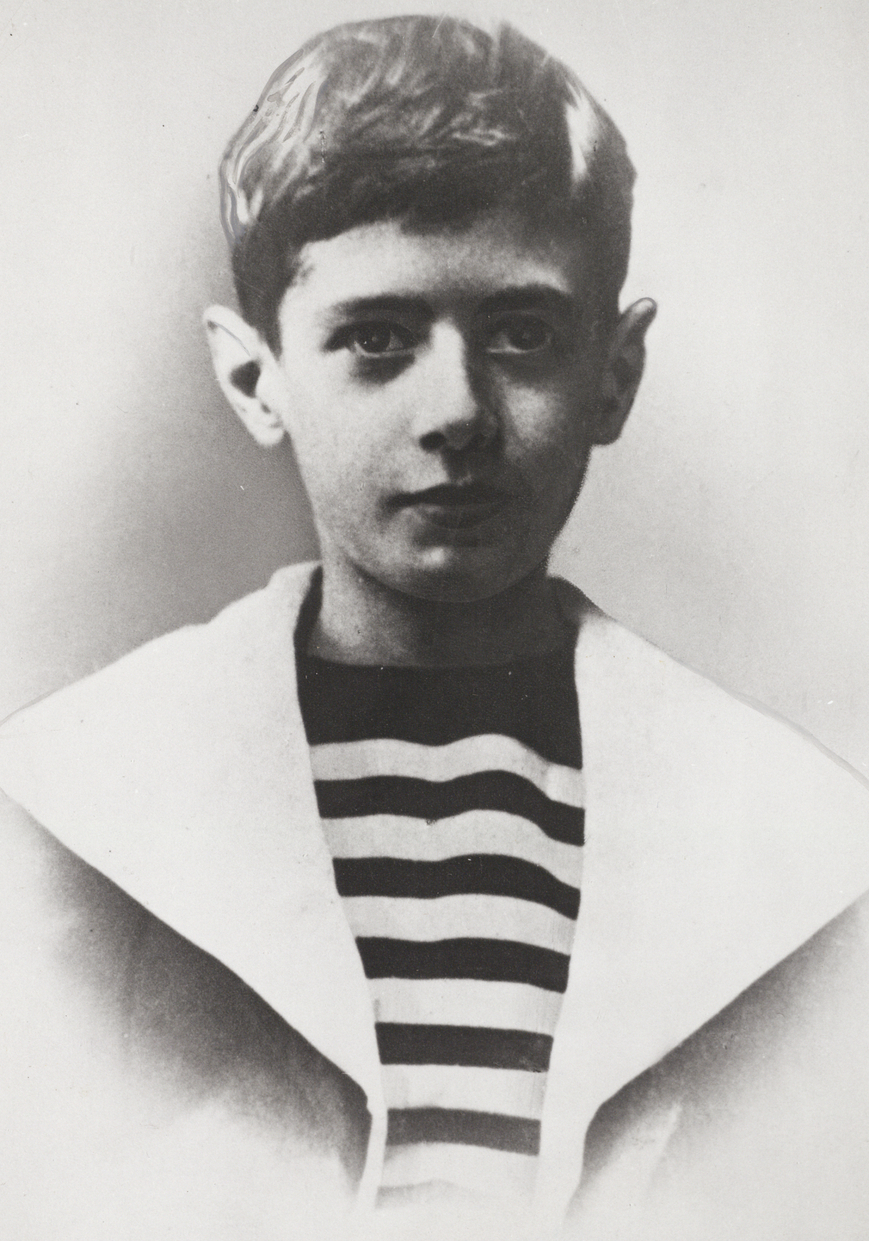
Charles de Gaulle, sometime in the 1900s

=== Education and intellectual influences ===
De Gaulle began writing in his early teens, especially poetry; his family paid for a composition, a one-act verse play, to be privately published. He enjoyed philosophy written by such writers as Bergson, Péguy, and Barrès. In addition to the German philosophers Nietzsche, Kant, and Goethe, he read the works of the ancient Greeks (especially Plato) and the prose of Chateaubriand.

De Gaulle was educated in Paris at the Catholic Collège Stanislas and studied briefly in Belgium. At the age of 15, he wrote an essay imagining "General de Gaulle" leading the French Army to victory over Germany in 1930; he later wrote that in his youth he had looked forward with somewhat naive anticipation to the inevitable future war with Germany to avenge the French defeat of 1870.

France during de Gaulle's adolescence was a divided society, with many developments which were unwelcome to the de Gaulle family: the growth of socialism and syndicalism, the legal separation of Church and state in 1905, and the reduction in the term of military service to two years. Equally unwelcome were the Entente Cordiale agreements with Britain, the First Moroccan Crisis, and above all, the Dreyfus affair. Henri de Gaulle came to be a supporter of Dreyfus, but was less concerned with his innocence per se than with the disgrace which the army had brought onto itself. The period also saw a resurgence in evangelical Catholicism, the dedication of the Sacré-Cœur, Paris, and the rise of the cult of Joan of Arc.

De Gaulle was not an outstanding pupil until his mid-teens, but from July 1906 he focused on winning a place at the military academy, Saint-Cyr. Jean Lacouture suggests that de Gaulle joined the army, despite being more suited to a career as a writer and historian, partly to please his father and partly because it was one of the few unifying forces which represented the whole of French society. De Gaulle later wrote that "when I entered the Army, it was one of the greatest things in the world", a claim which Lacouture points out needs to be treated with caution: the army's reputation was at a low, since it was used extensively for strike-breaking. There were fewer than 700 applicants for Saint-Cyr in 1908, down from 2,000 at the turn of the century.

== Early career ==
=== Officer cadet and lieutenant ===
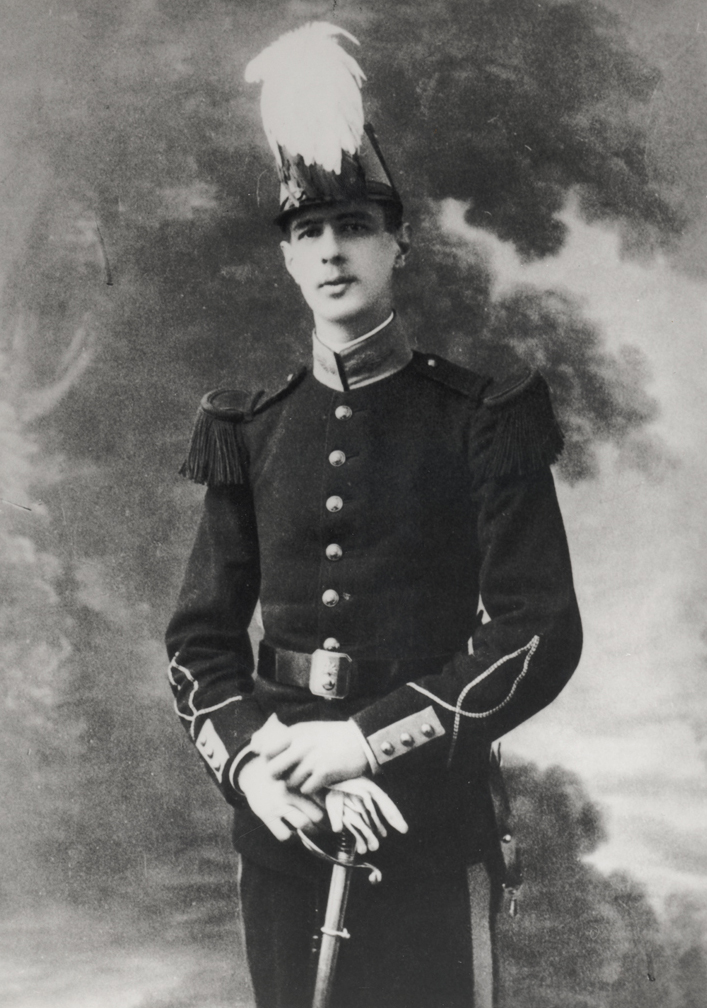
De Gaulle as a cadet in Saint-Cyr, 1910

In 1909, De Gaulle won a place at Saint-Cyr. His class ranking was mediocre (119th out of 221). Under a law of 21 March 1905, aspiring army officers were required to serve a year in the ranks, including time as a private and as a non-commissioned officer (NCO), before attending the academy. Accordingly, in October 1909, de Gaulle enlisted (for four years, as required, rather than the normal two-year term for conscripts) in the 33rd Infantry Regiment of the French Army, based at Arras. This was a historic regiment with Austerlitz, Wagram, and Borodino amongst its battle honours. In April 1910, he was promoted to corporal. His company commander declined to promote him to sergeant, the usual rank for a potential officer, commenting that the young man clearly felt that nothing less than Constable of France would be good enough for him. He was eventually promoted to sergeant in September 1910.

De Gaulle took up his place at Saint-Cyr in October 1910. By the end of his first year, he had risen to 45th place. He was nicknamed "the great asparagus" because of his height (196 cm, 6'5"), high forehead, and nose. He did well at the academy and received praise for his conduct, manners, intelligence, character, military spirit, and resistance to fatigue. In 1912, he graduated 13th in his class and his passing-out report noted that he was a gifted cadet who would undoubtedly make an excellent officer. The future Marshal Alphonse Juin was first in the class, although the two do not appear to have been close at the time.

Preferring to serve in France rather than the overseas colonies, in October 1912 de Gaulle rejoined the 33rd Infantry Regiment as a second lieutenant. The regiment was now commanded by Colonel (and future Marshal) Philippe Pétain, whom de Gaulle would follow for the next 15 years. He later wrote in his memoirs: "My first colonel, Pétain, taught me the art of command".

It has been claimed that in the build-up to World War I, de Gaulle agreed with Pétain about the obsolescence of cavalry and traditional tactics, and often debated great battles and the likely outcome of any coming war with his superior. Lacouture is sceptical, pointing out that although Pétain wrote glowing appraisals of de Gaulle in 1913, it is unlikely that he stood out among the 19 captains and 32 lieutenants under his command. De Gaulle would have been present at the 1913 Arras manoeuvres, at which Pétain criticised General Gallet to his face, but there is no evidence in his notebooks that he accepted Pétain's unfashionable ideas about the importance of firepower against the dominant doctrine emphasizing "offensive spirit". De Gaulle stressed how Maurice de Saxe had banned volley fire, how French armies of the Napoleonic period had relied on infantry column attack, and how French military power had declined in the nineteenth century because of – supposedly – excessive concentration on firepower rather than élan. He also appears to have accepted the then-fashionable lesson drawn from the recent Russo-Japanese War of how bayonet charges by Japanese infantry with high morale had succeeded in the face of enemy firepower.

De Gaulle was promoted to first lieutenant in October 1913.

== World War I ==
=== Combat commander ===
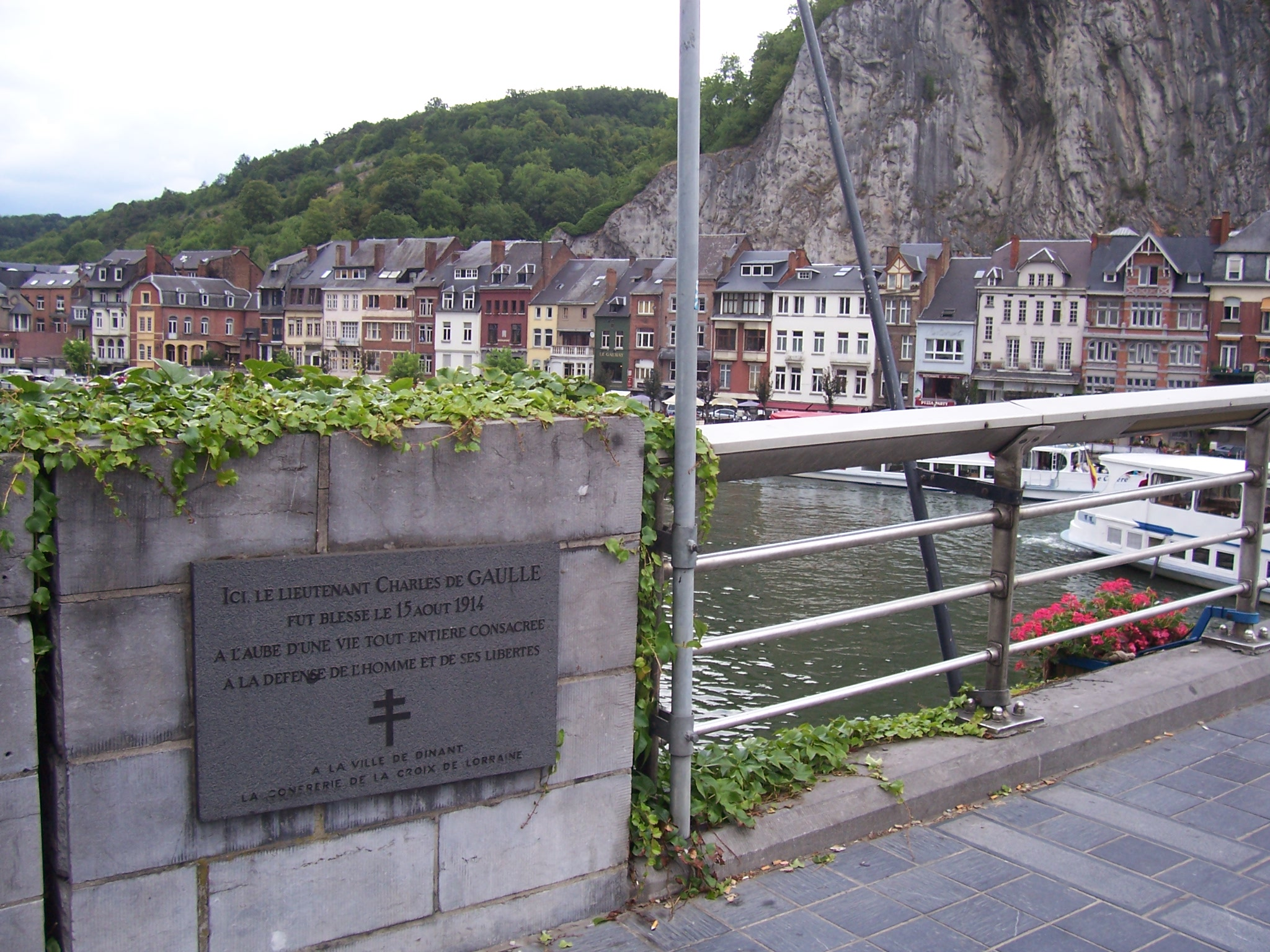
A plaque in Dinant commemorating the place where Charles de Gaulle, then an infantry lieutenant, was wounded in 1914

When war broke out in France in early August 1914, the 33rd Regiment, considered one of the best fighting units in France, was immediately thrown into checking the German advance at Dinant. However, the French Fifth Army commander, General Charles Lanrezac, remained wedded to 19th-century battle tactics, throwing his units into pointless bayonet charges against German artillery, incurring heavy losses.

As a platoon commander, de Gaulle was involved in fierce fighting from the outset. He received his baptism by fire on 15 August and was among the first to be wounded when he took a bullet in the knee at the Battle of Dinant. It is sometimes claimed that while in the hospital, he grew bitter at the tactics used and spoke with other wounded officers against the outdated methods of the French army. However, there is no contemporary evidence that he understood the importance of artillery in modern warfare. Instead, in his writing at the time, he criticised the "overrapid" offensive, the inadequacy of French generals, and the "slowness of the English troops".

He rejoined his regiment in October, as commander of the 7th company. Many of his former comrades were already dead. In December he became regimental adjutant.

De Gaulle's unit gained recognition for repeatedly crawling out into no man's land to listen to the conversations of the enemy, and the information brought back was so valuable that on 18 January 1915 he was awarded the Croix de Guerre. On 10 February, he was promoted to captain, initially on probation. On 10 March 1915, at the First Battle of Champagne, de Gaulle was shot in the left hand, a wound which initially seemed trivial but became infected. The wound incapacitated him for four months and later forced him to wear his wedding ring on the right hand. In August, he commanded the 10th company before returning to duty as regimental adjutant. On 3 September 1915, his rank of captain became permanent. In late October, he returned to command of the 10th company.

As a company commander at Douaumont (during the Battle of Verdun) on 2 March 1916, while leading a charge to try to break out of a position which had become surrounded, he received a bayonet wound to the left thigh after being stunned by a shell and was captured after passing out from the effects of poison gas. He was one of the few survivors of his battalion. The circumstances of his capture would later become a subject of debate as anti-Gaullists spread rumours that he had actually surrendered, a claim de Gaulle nonchalantly dismissed.

=== Prisoner ===
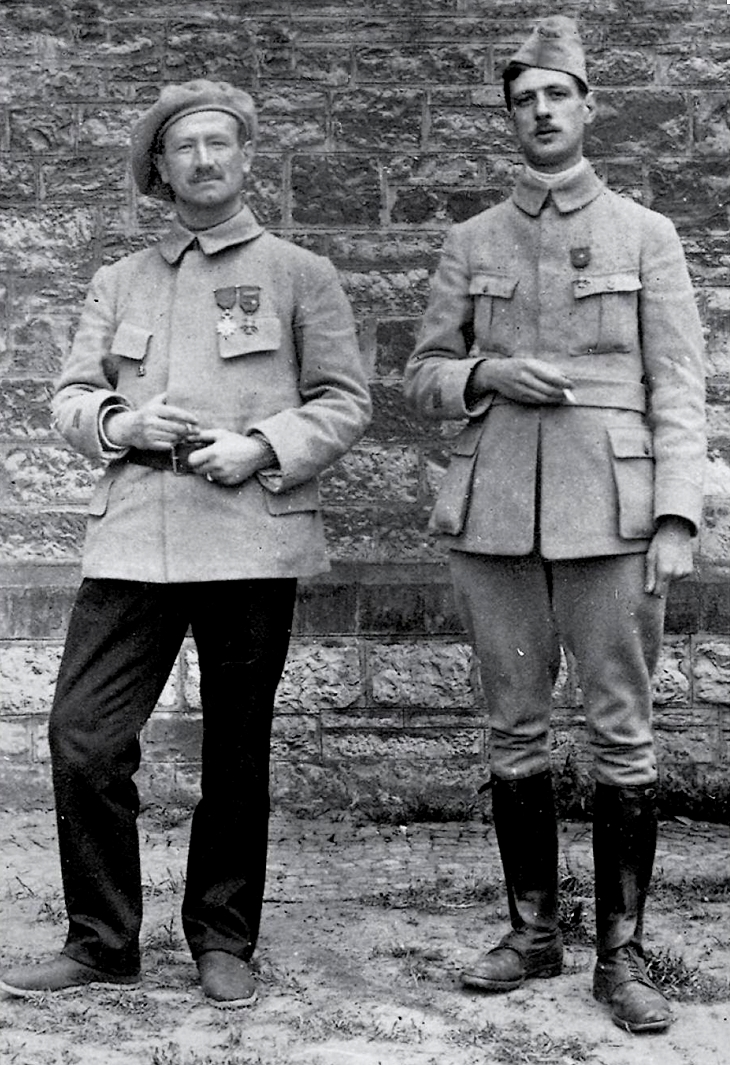
Captain De Gaulle (right) with another French POW

De Gaulle spent 32 months in six different prisoner camps, but he spent most time in the Ingolstadt Fortress, where his treatment was satisfactory.

In captivity, de Gaulle read German newspapers (he had learned German at school and spent a summer vacation in Germany) and gave talks on his view of the conflict to fellow prisoners. His patriotic fervour and confidence in victory earned him the nickname Le Connétable ("The Constable"), the title of the medieval commander-in-chief of the French army. In Ingolstadt were also journalist Remy Roure, who would eventually become a political ally of de Gaulle, and Mikhail Tukhachevsky, a future commander of the Red Army. De Gaulle became acquainted with Tukhachevsky, whose military theories about a fast-moving, mechanized army closely resembled his own. He also wrote his first book, Discorde chez l'ennemi (The Enemy's House Divided), analysing the divisions within the German forces. The book was published in 1924.

Originally interned at Rosenberg Fortress, he was moved to progressively higher-security facilities like Ingolstadt. De Gaulle made five unsuccessful escape attempts, and was routinely punished with long periods of solitary confinement and the withdrawal of privileges such as newspapers and tobacco. He attempted escape by hiding in a laundry basket, digging a tunnel, digging through a wall, and even posing as a nurse. In letters to his parents, he constantly spoke of his frustration that the war was continuing without him. As the war neared its end, he grew depressed that he was playing no part in the victory, but he remained in captivity until the armistice. On 1 December 1918, three weeks later, he returned to his father's house in the Dordogne to be reunited with his three brothers, who had all also served in the army.

== Between the wars ==
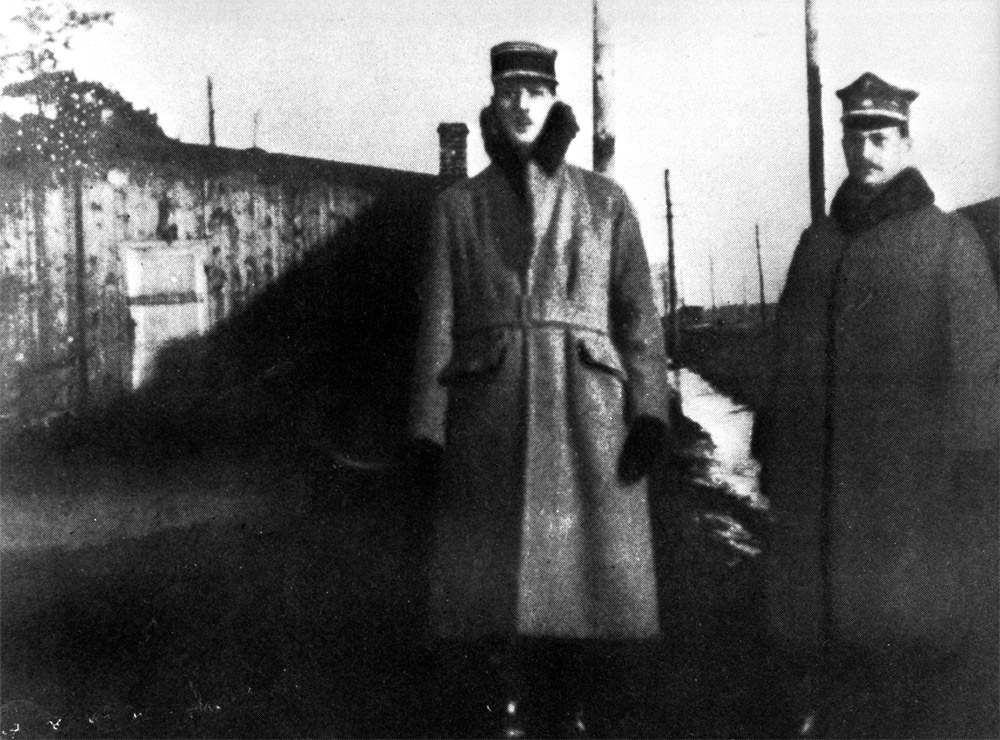
De Gaulle during the mission to Poland, c. 1920

=== Early 1920s: Poland and staff college ===
After the armistice, de Gaulle served with the staff of the French Military Mission to Poland as an instructor of Poland's infantry during its war with communist Russia (1919–1921). He distinguished himself in operations near the River Zbrucz, with the rank of major in the Polish army, and won Poland's highest military decoration, the Virtuti Militari.

De Gaulle returned to France, where he became a lecturer in military history at Saint-Cyr. He studied at the École de Guerre (military staff college) from November 1922 to October 1924. There, he clashed with his instructor Colonel Moyrand by arguing for tactics based on circumstances rather than doctrine; after an exercise in which he had played the role of commander, he refused to answer a question about supplies, replying "de minimis non curat praetor" (roughly: "the praetor does not concern himself with trifles"), before ordering the responsible officer to answer Moyrand.

He obtained respectable, but not outstanding grades on many of his assessments. Moyrand wrote in his final report that he was "an intelligent, cultured and serious-minded officer; has brilliance and talent", but criticised him for not deriving as much benefit from the course as he should have, and for his arrogance: his "excessive self-confidence", his harsh dismissal of the views of others, "and his attitude of a King in exile". Having entered 33rd out of 129, he graduated in 52nd place, with a grade of assez bien ("good enough"). He was posted to Mainz, Germany to help supervise supplies of food and equipment for the French Army of Occupation. De Gaulle's book La Discorde chez l'ennemi had appeared in March 1924. In March 1925 he published an essay on the use of tactics according to circumstances, a deliberate defiance of Moyrand.

=== Mid-1920s: Ghostwriter for Pétain ===
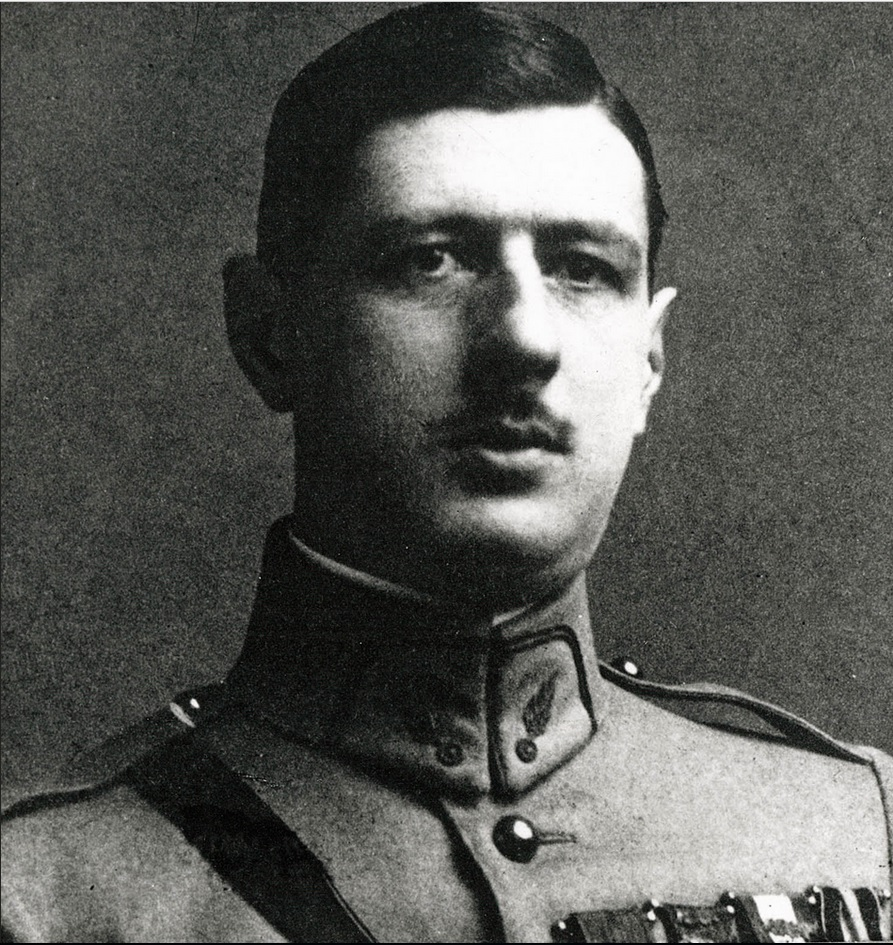
De Gaulle at the École supérieure de guerre, between 1922 and 1924

De Gaulle's career was saved by Pétain, who arranged for his staff college grade to be amended to bien ("good"—but not the "excellent" needed for a general staff posting). From 1 July 1925 he worked for Pétain (as part of the Maison Pétain), largely as a "pen officer" (ghostwriter). De Gaulle disapproved of Pétain's decision to take command in Morocco in 1925 (he was later known to remark that "Marshal Pétain was a great man. He died in 1925, but he did not know it") and of what he saw as the lust for public adulation of Pétain and his wife. In 1925, de Gaulle began to cultivate Joseph Paul-Boncour, his first political patron. On 1 December 1925, he published an essay on the "Historical Role of French Fortresses". This was a popular topic because of the Maginot Line which was then being planned, but he argued that the aim of fortresses should be to weaken the enemy, not to economise on defence.

Friction arose between de Gaulle and Pétain over Le Soldat ("The Soldier"), a history of the French soldier which de Gaulle had ghost-written and for which he wanted greater writing credit. He had written mainly historical material, but Pétain wanted to add a final chapter of his own thoughts. There was at least one stormy meeting late in 1926 after which de Gaulle was seen to emerge, white with anger, from Pétain's office. In October 1926, he returned to his duties with the Headquarters of the Army of the Rhine.

De Gaulle had sworn that he would never return to the École de Guerre except as commandant, but at Pétain's invitation, and introduced to the stage by his patron, he delivered three lectures there in April 1927: "Leadership in Wartime", "Character", and "Prestige". These later formed the basis for his book, The Edge of the Sword (1932).

=== Late-1920s: Trier and Beirut ===
After spending twelve years as a captain, a normal period, de Gaulle was promoted to commandant (major) on 25 September 1927. In November 1927, he began a two-year posting as commanding officer of the 19th chasseurs à pied (a battalion of elite light infantry) with the occupation forces at Trier.

De Gaulle trained his men hard (a river crossing exercise of the freezing Moselle River at night was vetoed by his commanding general). He imprisoned a soldier for appealing to his deputy for a transfer to a more comfortable unit and, when he was investigated over the incident, initially tried to invoke his status as a member of the Maison Pétain. Eventually, he appealed to Pétain to protect himself from a reprimand for interfering with the soldier's political rights. An observer wrote of de Gaulle at the time that, although he encouraged young officers, "his ego...glowed from far off". In the winter of 1928–1929, thirty soldiers ("not counting Annamese") died from so-called "German flu", seven of them from de Gaulle's battalion. After an investigation, he was singled out for praise in the ensuing parliamentary debate as an exceptionally capable commanding officer, and mention of how he had worn a mourning band for a private soldier who was an orphan earned praise from the Prime Minister Raymond Poincaré.

The breach between de Gaulle and Pétain over the ghost-writing of Le Soldat had deepened in 1928. Pétain brought in a new ghostwriter, Colonel Audet, who was unwilling to take on the job and wrote to de Gaulle in some embarrassment to take over the project. Pétain was quite friendly about the matter but did not publish the book. In 1929, Pétain did not use de Gaulle's draft text for his eulogy for the late Ferdinand Foch, whose seat at the Académie Française he was assuming.

The Allied occupation of the Rhineland was ending, and de Gaulle's battalion was due to be disbanded, although the decision was later rescinded after he had moved to his next posting. De Gaulle wanted a teaching post at the École de Guerre in 1929. There was apparently a threat of mass resignation of the faculty if he were to be appointed. There was talk of a posting to Corsica or North Africa, but on Pétain's advice he accepted a two-year posting to Lebanon and Syria. In Beirut, he was chief of the 3rd Bureau (military operations) of General Louis-Paul-Gaston de Bigault du Granrut, who wrote a glowing reference recommending him for high command.

=== 1930s: Staff officer ===
In the spring of 1931, as his posting in Beirut drew to a close, de Gaulle once again asked Pétain for a posting to the École de Guerre. Pétain tried to obtain an appointment for him there as Professor of History, but once again the faculty would not have him. Instead de Gaulle, drawing on plans he had drawn up in 1928 for reform of that institution, asked Pétain to create a special post for him which would enable him to lecture on "the Conduct of War" both to the École de Guerre and to the Centre des Hautes Études Militaires (CHEM – a senior staff college for generals, known as the "school for marshals"), to civilians at the École Normale Supérieure, and to civil servants.

Pétain instead advised him to apply for a posting to the Secrétariat Général du Conseil Supérieur de la Défense Nationale (SGDN – General Secretariat of the Supreme War Council) in Paris. Pétain promised to lobby for the appointment, which he thought would be good experience for him. De Gaulle was posted to SGDN in November 1931, initially as a "drafting officer".

In December 1932, he was promoted to lieutenant-colonel and appointed Head of the Third Section (operations). His service at SGDN gave him six years' experience with the interface between army planning and government, enabling him to take on ministerial responsibilities in 1940.

After studying arrangements in the US, Italy, and Belgium, de Gaulle drafted a bill for the organisation of the country in wartime. He made a presentation about his bill to the CHEM. The bill passed the Chamber of Deputies but failed in the Senate.

=== Early 1930s: Proponent of armoured warfare ===
Unlike Pétain, de Gaulle believed in the use of tanks and rapid maneuvers rather than trench warfare. De Gaulle became a disciple of Émile Mayer, a retired lieutenant-colonel (his career had been damaged by the Dreyfus Affair) and military thinker. Mayer thought that, although wars were still bound to happen, it was "obsolete" for civilised countries to threaten or wage war on one another. He had a low opinion of French generals, and was a critic of the Maginot Line and a proponent of mechanised warfare. Lacouture suggests that Mayer focused de Gaulle's thoughts away from his obsession with the mystique of the strong leader (Le Fil d'Epée: 1932) and back to loyalty to Republican institutions and military reform.

In 1934, de Gaulle wrote Vers l'Armée de Métier (Towards a Professional Army), in which he proposed mechanization of the infantry, with stress on an élite force of 100,000 men and 3,000 tanks. The book imagined tanks driving around the country like cavalry. De Gaulle's mentor Emile Mayer was somewhat more prophetic than he was about the future importance of air power on the battlefield. Such an army would both compensate for France's population shortage and be an efficient tool to enforce international law, particularly the Treaty of Versailles. He also thought it would be a precursor to a deeper national reorganisation, and wrote that "a master has to make his appearance [...] whose orders cannot be challenged – a man upheld by public opinion".

Only 700 copies of the book were sold in France, while the claim that thousands of copies were sold in Germany is thought to be an exaggeration. De Gaulle used the book to widen his contacts among journalists, notably with André Pironneau, editor of L'Écho de Paris. The book attracted praise across the political spectrum, apart from the hard left who were committed to the Republican ideal of a citizen army. De Gaulle's views attracted the attention of the maverick politician Paul Reynaud, to whom he wrote frequently, sometimes in obsequious terms. Reynaud first invited him to meet on 5 December 1934.

De Gaulle was deeply focused on his career at the time. There is no evidence that he was tempted by fascism, and there is little evidence of his views either on the domestic upheavals in 1934 and 1936, or the many foreign policy crises of the decade. He approved of the rearmament drive which the Popular Front government began in 1936, although French military doctrine remained that tanks should be used in small numbers for infantry support—in contrast, German panzer units would be used in 1940 in a manner similar to what de Gaulle had advocated. A rare insight into de Gaulle's political views is a letter to his mother warning that war with Germany was inevitable and reassuring her that Pierre Laval's pact with the USSR in 1935 was for the best, likening it to Francis I's alliance with the Turks against Roman Emperor Charles V.

=== Late 1930s: Tank regiment ===
From April 1936, whilst still in his staff position at SGDN, de Gaulle was a lecturer to generals at CHEM. De Gaulle's superiors disapproved of his views about tanks, and he was passed over for promotion to full colonel in 1936, supposedly because his service record was not good enough. He called on his political patron Reynaud, who showed his record to Minister of War Édouard Daladier. Daladier, who was an enthusiast for rearmament with modern weapons, ensured that his name was on the promotion list for the following year.

In 1937, General Bineau, who had taught de Gaulle at Saint-Cyr, wrote on his report on his lectureship at CHEM that he was highly able and suitable for high command in the future, but that he hid his attributes under "a cold and lofty attitude". On 13 July 1937, he was put in command of the 507th Tank Regiment (a battalion of medium Char D2s and a battalion of R35 light tanks) at Metz, and his promotion to full colonel took effect on 24 December that year. De Gaulle attracted public attention by leading a parade of 80 tanks into the Place d'Armes at Metz, in his command tank "Austerlitz".

By then, de Gaulle was becoming a well-known figure, known as "Colonel Motor(s)". At the invitation of the publisher Plon, he produced another book in 1938, La France et son Armée (France and Her Army). De Gaulle incorporated much of the text he had written for Pétain a decade earlier for the uncompleted Le Soldat into his own book, to Pétain's displeasure. De Gaulle agreed to include a dedication to Pétain (although he wrote his own rather than using the draft Pétain sent him), which was dropped from postwar editions. Until 1938, Pétain had treated de Gaulle, as Lacouture puts it, "with unbounded good will", but by October 1938 he privately thought his former protégé "an ambitious man, and very ill-bred".

== World War II ==
=== Division commander ===
At the outbreak of World War II, de Gaulle was put in command of the tanks of the French Fifth Army (five scattered battalions, largely equipped with R35 light tanks) under General Victor Bourret in Alsace. On 12 September 1939, he was part of the attack at Bitche, which occurred simultaneously with the Saar Offensive.

At the start of October 1939, Reynaud asked for a staff posting under de Gaulle, but remained at his post as Minister of Finance. De Gaulle's tanks were inspected by President Lebrun, who was impressed, but regretted that it was too late to implement his ideas. He wrote a paper titled L'Avènement de la force mécanique (The coming of the Armoured Force), which he sent to General Georges (commander-in-chief on the northeast front – who was not especially impressed) and the politician Leon Blum. Daladier, Prime Minister at the time, was too busy to read it.

In late February 1940, Reynaud told de Gaulle that he had been earmarked for command of an armoured division as soon as one became available. Early in 1940 (the exact date is uncertain), de Gaulle proposed to Reynaud that he be appointed Secretary-General of the War Council, which would effectively make him the government's military adviser. When Reynaud became prime minister in March, he was reliant on Daladier's backing, so the job went instead to politician Paul Baudouin. In late March, Reynaud told de Gaulle that he would be given command of the 4th Armoured Division, due to form by 15 May. The government appeared likely to be restructured, as Daladier and Maurice Gamelin (commander-in-chief) were under criticism in the aftermath of the Allied defeat in Norway, and had this happened, de Gaulle—who, on 3 May, was still lobbying Reynaud for a restructuring of the control of the war—might well have joined the government. By 7 May, he was assembling the staff of his new division.

=== Battle of France ===
On 10 May, the Germans attacked the Netherlands, Belgium, and France. De Gaulle activated his new division on 12 May. The Germans broke through at Sedan on 15 May 1940. That day, with three tank battalions assembled (less than a third of his paper strength), he was summoned to headquarters and told to attack to gain time for General Robert Touchon's Sixth Army to redeploy from the Maginot Line to the Aisne. General Georges told him it was his chance to implement his ideas.

De Gaulle attacked the German-held village at Montcornet, a key road junction near Laon. The attack began around 04:30 on 17 May. Outnumbered and without air support, he lost 23 of his 90 vehicles to mines, anti-tank weapons, and Stukas (ground-attack airplanes). On 18 May, he was reinforced by two fresh regiments of armoured cavalry, bringing his strength to 150 vehicles. He attacked again on 19 May, and his forces were devastated once again. He ignored orders from General Georges to withdraw, and in the early afternoon demanded two more divisions from Touchon, who refused. Although de Gaulle's tanks forced German infantry to retreat to Caumont, the action brought only temporary relief and did little to slow the spearhead of the German advance. Nevertheless, it was one of the few successes the French experienced while suffering defeats across the country.

De Gaulle delayed his retreat until 20 May; on 21 May, at the request of propaganda officers, he gave a talk on French radio about his recent attack. In recognition for his efforts, de Gaulle was promoted to the rank of brigadier-general on 23 May 1940. Later, on 28–29 May, de Gaulle attacked the German bridgehead at Abbeville, taking around 300 German prisoners in a last attempt to cut an escape route for the Allied forces.

De Gaulle's rank of brigadier-general became effective on 1 June 1940. That day he was in Paris; after visiting his tailor to be fitted for his general's uniform, he met Reynaud, who appears to have offered him a government job for the first time, and afterwards met the commander-in-chief Maxime Weygand, who congratulated him on saving France's honour and asked for his advice. On 2 June, he sent a memo to Weygand vainly urging that the French armoured divisions be consolidated from four weak divisions into three stronger ones and concentrated into an armoured corps under his command. He made the same suggestion to Reynaud.

==== Government minister ====
On 5 June, the day the Germans began the second phase of their offensive (Fall Rot), Prime Minister Paul Reynaud appointed de Gaulle Under-Secretary of State for National Defence and War, with particular responsibility for coordination with the British. Weygand objected to the appointment, thinking him "a mere child". Pétain (deputy prime minister) was also displeased and told Reynaud the story of the ghost-writing of Le Soldat. His appointment received a good deal of press attention, both in France and in the UK. He asked for an English-speaking aide and Geoffroy Chodron de Courcel was given the job.

On 8 June, de Gaulle visited Weygand, who believed it was "the end" and that after France was defeated, Britain would soon sue for peace. A day later, de Gaulle flew to London and met British Prime Minister Winston Churchill for the first time. It was thought that half a million men could be evacuated to French North Africa, provided the British and French navies and air forces coordinated their efforts. Either at this meeting or on 16 June, he urged Churchill in vain to throw more Royal Air Force (RAF) aircraft into the Battle of France, but conceded that Churchill was right to refuse.

On 11 June, de Gaulle drove to Arcis-sur-Aube and offered General Charles Huntziger Weygand's job as Commander-in-Chief. Huntziger accepted in principle, but de Gaulle was unable to persuade Reynaud to sack Weygand. On 13 June, de Gaulle attended another Anglo-French conference at Tours with Churchill, Lord Halifax, Lord Beaverbrook, Edward Spears, Sir Hastings Ismay, and Sir Alexander Cadogan. De Gaulle was dissuaded from resigning by the Interior Minister Georges Mandel, who argued that the war was just beginning, and that de Gaulle needed to keep his reputation unsullied. Nevertheless, at around 9:00 on 17 June, de Gaulle flew to London on a British aircraft with Spears. De Gaulle later told André Malraux of the mental anguish which his flight to London—a break with the French Army and with the recognised government, which would inevitably be seen as treason by many—had caused him.

=== Leader of the Free French in exile ===
==== Appeal from London ====
General de Gaulle speaking on BBC Radio during the war

De Gaulle landed at Heston Airport soon after 12:30 on 17 June 1940. He saw Churchill at around 15:00, and Churchill offered him broadcast time on the BBC. They both knew about Pétain's broadcast earlier that day that stated that "the fighting must end" and that he had approached the Germans for terms. That evening de Gaulle dined with Jean Monnet and denounced Pétain's "treason". The next day the British Cabinet (Churchill was not present, as it was the day of his "Finest Hour" speech) were reluctant to agree to de Gaulle's giving a radio address, as Britain was still in communication with the Pétain government about the fate of the French fleet. Duff Cooper (minister of information) had an advance copy of the address, to which there were no objections. The cabinet eventually agreed after individual lobbying, as indicated by a handwritten amendment to the cabinet minutes.

De Gaulle's Appeal of 18 June exhorted the French people not to be demoralized and to continue to resist occupation. He also – apparently on his own initiative – declared that he would broadcast again the next day. Few people listened to the 18 June speech; the speech was published in some newspapers in mainland France. It was largely aimed at French soldiers who were in Britain after being evacuated from Norway and Dunkirk; however, most showed no interest in fighting for de Gaulle's Free French Forces and were repatriated to France to become German prisoners of war. The small audience of the 18 June appeal grew for later speeches, and the press by early August described Free French military as fighting under de Gaulle's command, although few in France knew anything about him.

The Vichy regime had already sentenced de Gaulle to four years' imprisonment; on 2 August 1940 he was condemned to death by court martial in absentia, although Pétain commented that he would ensure that the sentence was never carried out. De Gaulle said of the sentence, "I consider the act of the Vichy men as void; I shall have an explanation with them after the victory". On 7 August 1940, he and Churchill reached an agreement that Britain would fund the Free French, with the bill to be settled after the war (the financial agreement was finalised in March 1941). A separate letter guaranteed the territorial integrity of the French Empire.

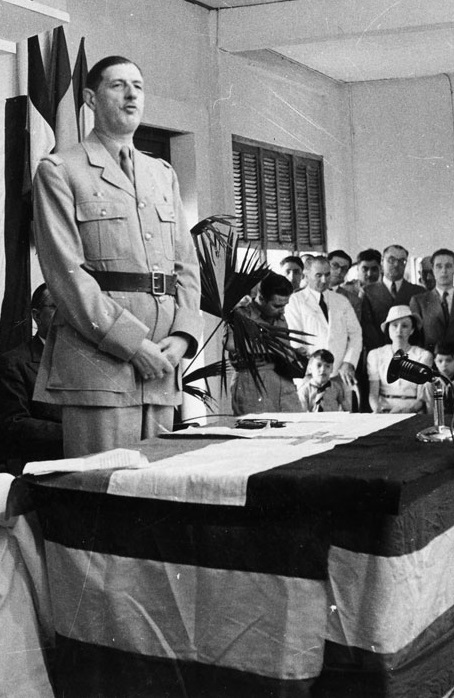
De Gaulle at the inauguration of the Brazzaville Conference, French Equatorial Africa, 1944

De Gaulle's support grew out of a base in the colonial French Equatorial Africa. In the autumn of 1940, the colonial empire largely supported the Vichy regime. Félix Éboué, governor of Chad, switched his support to General de Gaulle in September. Encouraged, de Gaulle traveled to Brazzaville in October, where he announced the formation of an Empire Defense Council in his "Brazzaville Manifesto", and invited all colonies still supporting Vichy to join him and the Free French forces in the fight against Germany, which most of them did by 1943.

==== Algiers ====
After Operation Torch in November 1942, de Gaulle moved his headquarters to Algiers in May 1943, working with the French Resistance and other supporters in France's African colonies. He first became joint head with the less resolutely independent General Henri Giraud (the candidate preferred by the US who mistakenly suspected de Gaulle of being a British puppet), then later became sole chairman of the French Committee of National Liberation, after squeezing out Giraud by force of personality.

De Gaulle was held in high regard by Allied commander General Dwight Eisenhower. In Algiers in 1943, Eisenhower gave de Gaulle the assurance in person that a French force would liberate Paris and arranged that the army division of French General Philippe Leclerc de Hauteclocque would be transferred from North Africa to the UK to carry out that liberation. Eisenhower was impressed by the combativeness of units of the Free French Forces and "grateful for the part they had played in mopping up the remnants of German resistance"; he also noticed how strongly devoted many were to de Gaulle, and how ready they were to accept him as the national leader.

==== Preparations for D-Day ====
Winston Churchill and General de Gaulle at Marrakesh, January 1944

As preparations for the liberation of Europe gathered pace, the US in particular found de Gaulle's tendency to view everything from the French perspective to be extremely tiresome; President Franklin D. Roosevelt, who refused to recognize any provisional authority in France until elections had been held, referred to de Gaulle as "an apprentice dictator", a view backed by a number of leading Frenchmen in Washington, D.C., including Jean Monnet, who later became instrumental in setting up the European Coal and Steel Community that led to the modern European Union. Roosevelt directed Churchill not to provide de Gaulle with strategic details of the imminent invasion because he did not trust him to keep the information to himself. French codes were considered to be less secure, which posed a risk because the Free French refused to use British or American codes. De Gaulle also refused to share coded information with the British, who were then obliged secretly to break the codes to read French messages.

On 4 June 1944, upon his arrival at RAF Northolt, de Gaulle received an official welcome. Later, on his personal train, Churchill informed de Gaulle that he wanted him to make a radio address; however, de Gaulle reportedly became angry when he was informed that the Americans refused to recognise his right to power in France. After Churchill suggested he request a meeting with Roosevelt to improve his relationship with the US president, he demanded to know why he should "lodge my candidacy for power in France with Roosevelt; the French government exists".

==== Return to France ====
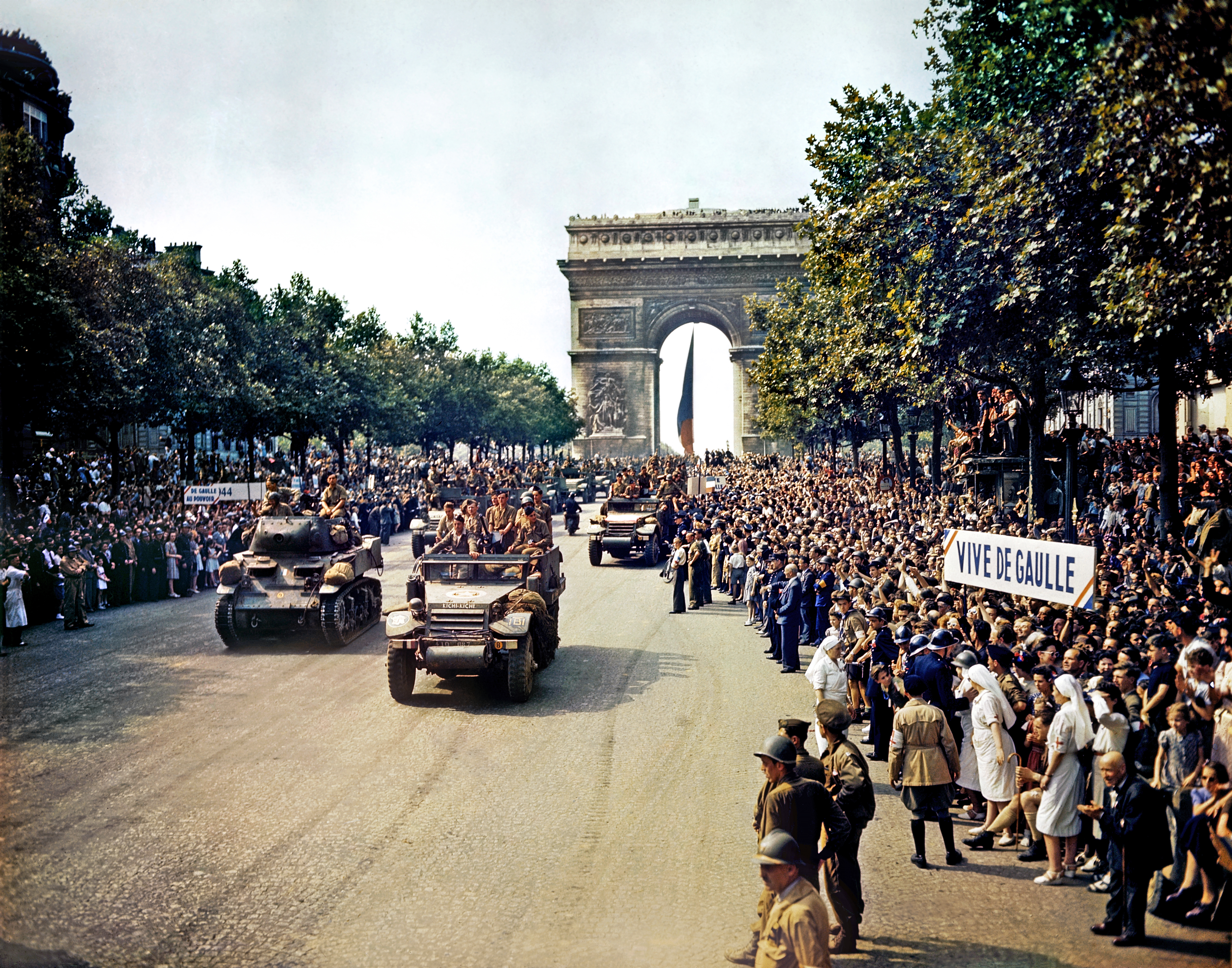
The 2nd Armored Division passes through the Arc de Triomphe. Signs read "Long live de Gaulle" and "De Gaulle to power".

On 14 June 1944, he left Britain for the city of Bayeux, Normandy, which he proclaimed as the capital of Free France. Appointing his Aide-de-Camp François Coulet as head of the civil administration, de Gaulle returned to the UK that same night on a French destroyer ship, and although the official position of the supreme military command remained unchanged, local Allied officers found it more practical to deal with the fledgling administration in Bayeux in everyday matters, which set a precedent of the Provisional Government running the civil affairs of liberated France. On 16 June, de Gaulle flew to Algiers, then went to Rome to meet Pope Pius XII and the new Italian government.

At the beginning of July, he visited Roosevelt in Washington, where he received the 17 gun salute of a senior military leader, rather than the 21 guns of a visiting head of state. De Gaulle successfully lobbied for Paris to be made a priority for liberation on humanitarian grounds and obtained an agreement from Allied supreme commander General Dwight D. Eisenhower that French troops would be allowed to enter the capital first. A few days later, General Leclerc's division entered the outskirts of the city, and after six days of fighting, in which the resistance played a major part, the German garrison of 5000 men surrendered on 25 August 1944, although some sporadic fighting continued for several days.

On the evening of 26 August, the Wehrmacht launched a massive aerial and artillery barrage on Paris in retaliation, leaving several thousand dead or injured. The situation in Paris remained tense, and a few days later, de Gaulle asked General Eisenhower to send American troops into Paris as a show of strength. On 29 August, the US 28th Infantry Division was rerouted from its journey to the front line and paraded down the Champs Elysees.

The same day, Washington and London agreed to accept the position of the Free French. The following day, General Eisenhower showed his support with a visit to General de Gaulle in Paris.

== 1944–1946: Provisional Government of the French Republic ==
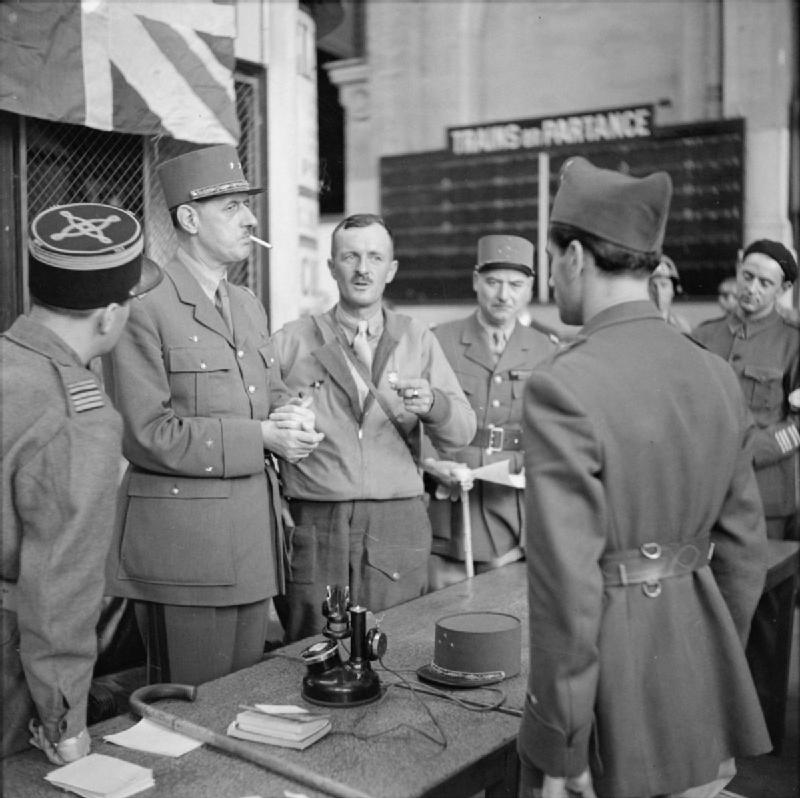
General de Gaulle with General Leclerc and other French officers at Montparnasse railway station in Paris, 25 August 1944

Roosevelt insisted that an Allied Military Government for Occupied Territories (AMGOT) should be implemented in France, but this was opposed by both the Secretary and Under-Secretary of War, as well as by Eisenhower, who had been strongly opposed to the imposition of AMGOT in North Africa. Unlike Roosevelt, Eisenhower wanted to cooperate with de Gaulle, and he secured a last-minute promise from the President on the eve of D-Day that the Allied officers would not act as military governors and would instead cooperate with the local authorities as the Allied forces liberated French Territory. De Gaulle would later claim in his memoirs that he was responsible for blocking AMGOT.

With the prewar parties and most of their leaders discredited, there was little opposition to de Gaulle and his associates forming an interim administration. In order not to be seen as presuming on his position in such austere times, de Gaulle did not use one of the grand official residences, such as the Hotel de Matignon or Élysée Palace, but resided briefly in his old office at the Ministry of War. When he was joined by his wife and daughters, they moved into a small state-owned villa on the edge of Bois de Boulogne, which had once been set aside for Nazi Party leader Hermann Göring.

On 10 November 1944, Churchill flew to Paris to a reception by de Gaulle; the two were greeted together by thousands of cheering Parisians on the next day. According to Harold Nicolson, Anthony Eden (future British prime minister) had told him, "not for one moment did Winston stop crying, and that he could have filled buckets by the time he received the Freedom of Paris." At an official luncheon, de Gaulle said:

"It is true that we would not have seen [the liberation] if our old and gallant ally England, and all the British dominions under precisely the impulsion and inspiration of those we are honouring today, had not deployed the extraordinary determination to win, and that magnificent courage which saved the freedom of the world. There is no French man or woman who is not touched to the depths of their hearts and souls by this."

=== Legal purges (Épuration légale) ===
Keenly aware of the need to seize the initiative and get the process under firm judicial control, de Gaulle appointed Justice Minister François de Menthon to lead the Legal Purge (Épuration légale) to punish traitors and clear away traces of the Vichy regime. Knowing that he would need to reprieve many of the "economic collaborators"—such as police and civil servants who held minor roles under Vichy to keep the country running—he assumed, as head of state, the right to commute death sentences. Of the nearly 2,000 people who received the death sentence from the courts, fewer than 800 were executed; de Gaulle commuted 998 of the 1,554 capital sentences submitted before him, including all those who were women. Many others were given jail terms or had their voting rights and other legal privileges taken away. It is generally agreed that the purges were conducted arbitrarily, with often absurdly severe or overly lenient punishments being handed down. Less well-off people who were unable to pay for lawyers were more harshly treated. As time went by and feelings grew less intense, a number of people who had held fairly senior positions under the Vichy government—such as Maurice Papon and René Bousquet—escaped consequences by claiming to have worked secretly for the resistance or to have played a double game, working for the good of France by serving the established order.

Pétain received a death sentence, which his old protégé de Gaulle commuted to life imprisonment, while Maxime Weygand was eventually acquitted. There was a widespread belief, particularly in the years that followed, that de Gaulle was trying to appease both the Third Republic politicians and the former Vichy leaders who had made Laval their scapegoat.

=== Yalta and Potsdam ===
De Gaulle was never invited to the summit conferences of Allied leaders such as Yalta and Potsdam. He never forgave the Big Three leaders (Churchill, Roosevelt and Stalin) for their neglect and continued to rage against it as having been a negative factor in European politics for the rest of his life.

After the Rhine crossings, the French First Army captured a large section of territory in southern Germany; although this later allowed France to play a part in the signing of the German surrender, Roosevelt particularly refused to allow any discussion about de Gaulle participating in the Big Three conferences that would shape Europe in the post-war world. Churchill pressed hard for France to be included "at the inter-allied table", but on 6 December 1944 the American president wired both Stalin and Churchill to say that de Gaulle's presence would "merely introduce a complicating and undesirable factor".

At the Yalta Conference in February 1945, despite Stalin's opposition, Churchill and Roosevelt insisted that France be allowed a post-war occupation zone in Germany, and also made sure that it was included among the five nations that invited others to the conference to establish the United Nations (UN). This guaranteed France a permanent seat on the UN Security Council.

=== Victory in Europe ===
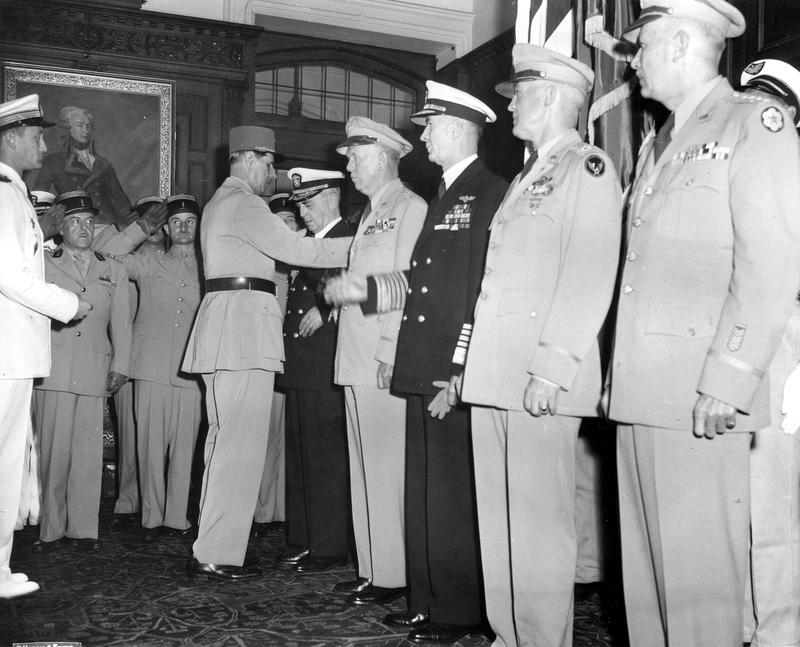
De Gaulle presenting the Legion of Honour to American Army and Navy officers William D. Leahy, George C. Marshall, Ernest J. King, Henry H. Arnold and Brehon B. Somervell

In May 1945, the German armies surrendered to the Americans and British at Rheims, and a separate armistice was signed with France in Berlin. De Gaulle refused to allow any British participation in the victory parade in Paris. However, among the vehicles that took part was an ambulance from the Hadfield-Spears Ambulance Unit, staffed by French doctors and British nurses. One of the nurses was Mary Spears, who had set up the unit and worked almost continuously since the Battle of France with Free French forces in the Middle East, North Africa, and Italy. Mary's husband was General Edward Spears, the British liaison to the Free French, who had personally spirited de Gaulle to safety in Britain in 1940. When de Gaulle saw the Union Flags and Tricolours side by side on the ambulance and heard French soldiers cheering, "Voilà Spears! Vive Spears!", he ordered that the unit be closed down immediately and its British staff sent home. A number of French troops returned their medals in protest and Mary wrote, "it is a pitiful business when a great man suddenly becomes small."

Another confrontation with the Americans broke out soon after the armistice, when the French sent troops to occupy the French-speaking Italian border region of Val d'Aoste. The French commander threatened to fire on American troops if they tried to stop them, and an irate President Truman ordered the immediate end to all arms shipments to France. Truman sent de Gaulle an angry letter saying that he found it unbelievable that the French could threaten to attack American troops after they had done so much to liberate France.

Within the same month, another crisis developed in Syria where French troops tried to quell nationalist protests at the continued occupation of the Levant. Winston Churchill opposed French action and, after they refused to negotiate, he ordered British forces into Syria from Transjordan with orders to fire on the French if necessary. Known as the Levant Crisis, British forces swept into Syria, forcing the French to stand down. With political pressure added by the United States and Soviet Union, the French ordered a ceasefire; this crisis further infuriated Truman. France evacuated its troops later in the year, but de Gaulle said to British ambassador Duff Cooper, "you have betrayed France and betrayed the West. That cannot be forgotten".

De Gaulle was generally well received in the United States immediately after World War II and supported the US in public comments. On 27 August 1945, he visited New York City to great welcome by thousands of people of the city and its mayor Fiorello La Guardia. On that day, de Gaulle wished "Long live the United States of America". He visited New York City Hall and Idlewild Airport (now John F. Kennedy International Airport), and presented LaGuardia with the Grand Croix of the Legion of Honour award.

=== New elections and resignation ===
Since the liberation, the only parliament in France had been an enlarged version of the Algiers Provisional Consultative Assembly, and at last, in October 1945, elections were held for a new Constituent Assembly, whose main task was to provide a new constitution for the Fourth Republic. De Gaulle favoured a strong executive for the nation, but all three of the main parties wished to severely restrict the powers of the president. The French Communist Party (PCF) wanted an assembly with full constitutional powers and unlimited time for drafting, whereas de Gaulle, the socialist French Section of Workers' International (SFIO), and the Popular Republican Movement (MRP) advocated one with a term limited to only seven months, after which the draft constitution would be submitted for another referendum.

On 13 November 1945, the new assembly unanimously elected Charles de Gaulle as head of the government, but problems immediately arose when it came to selecting the cabinet, due to his unwillingness to allow the PCF to hold any important ministries. The PCF, now the largest party, with its charismatic leader Maurice Thorez were not prepared to accept this for a second time, and a furious quarrel ensued, during which de Gaulle sent a letter of resignation to the speaker of the Assembly and declared that he was unwilling to trust a party that he considered to be an agent of a foreign power (Russia) with authority over the police and armed forces.

Eventually, the new cabinet was finalised on 21 November, with the PCF receiving five out of the twenty-two ministries; although they still did not get any key portfolios, de Gaulle believed that the draft constitution placed too much power in the hands of parliament with its shifting party alliances. One of his ministers said he was "a man equally incapable of monopolizing power as of sharing it".

De Gaulle outlined a programme of further nationalisations and a new economic plan, which were passed, but a further debate came when the PCF demanded a 20 percent reduction in the military budget. Refusing to "rule by compromise", de Gaulle once more threatened to resign; there was a general feeling that he was trying to blackmail the assembly into complete subservience. Although the MRP managed to broker a compromise which saw the budget approved with amendments, it was a stop-gap measure.

Barely two months after forming the new government, de Gaulle abruptly resigned on 20 January 1946. The move was called "a bold and ultimately foolish political ploy", with de Gaulle hoping that, as a war hero, he would be soon brought back as a more powerful executive by the French people. However, that did not turn out to be the case. With the war finally over, the initial crisis had passed. Although there were still shortages, particularly of bread, France was now recovering and de Gaulle suddenly did not seem so indispensable. The Communist publication Combat wrote, "There was no cataclysm, and the empty plate didn't crack".

== 1946–1958: Out of power ==
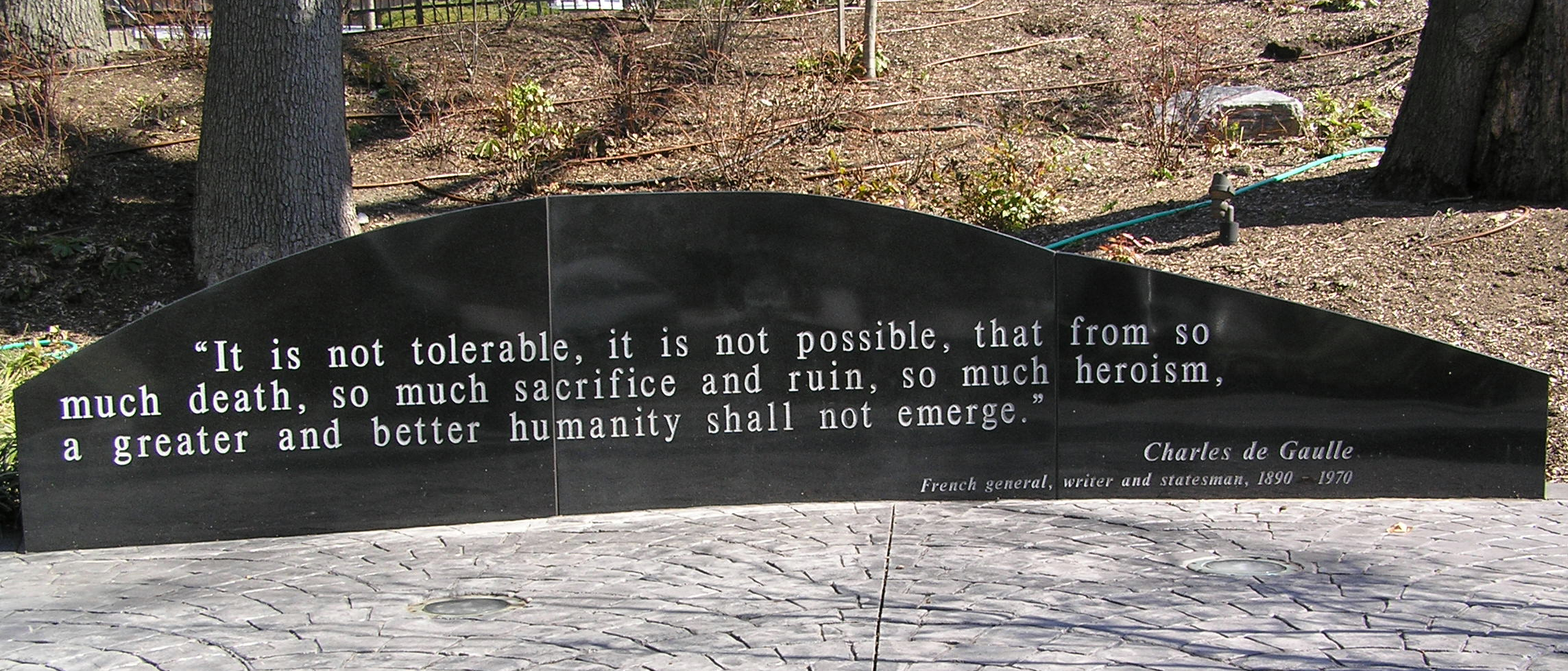
Quote from Charles de Gaulle, which reads, "It is not tolerable, it is not possible, that from so much death, so much sacrifice and ruin, so much heroism, a greater and better humanity shall not emerge."

De Gaulle suddenly dropped out of the public eye and returned to his home in Colombey-les-Deux-Églises to write his war memoirs. De Gaulle had told Pierre Bertaux in 1944 that he planned to retire because "France may still one day need an image that is pure ... If Joan of Arc had married, she would no longer have been Joan of Arc". The famous opening paragraph of Mémoires de guerre begins by declaring, "All my life, I have had a certain idea of France (une certaine idée de la France)", and ends by declaring that, given the divisive nature of French politics, France cannot truly live up to this ideal without a policy of "grandeur". During this period of formal retirement, however, de Gaulle maintained regular contact with past political lieutenants, including sympathizers involved in political developments in French Algeria, becoming "perhaps the best-informed man in France".

In April 1947, de Gaulle made a renewed attempt to transform the political scene by creating a Rassemblement du Peuple Français (Rally of the French People, RPF), which he hoped would be able to move above the party squabbles of the parliamentary system. Despite the new party taking 40 percent of the vote in local elections and 121 seats in 1951, the party's lack of its own press and access to television caused support to ebb. In May 1953, de Gaulle withdrew again from active politics, though the RPF lingered until September 1955.

As with all colonial powers, France began to lose its overseas possessions amid the surge of nationalism. French Indochina (now Vietnam, Laos, and Cambodia), colonised by France during the mid-19th century, had been lost to the Japanese in 1945. De Gaulle had intended to hold on to France's Indochina colony, ordering the parachuting of French agents and arms into Indochina in late 1944 and early 1945, with orders to attack the Japanese as American troops hit the beaches. Although de Gaulle had moved to consolidate French control of the territory during his brief first tenure as president in the 1940s, the communist Viet Minh League under Ho Chi Minh began a determined campaign for independence from 1946. The French fought a seven-year war (the First Indochina War) to maintain control of Indochina, which grew increasingly unpopular, especially after their defeat at the Battle of Dien Bien Phu in May 1954. The French military withdrew that summer under Prime Minister Pierre Mendès France.

The independence of Morocco and Tunisia was arranged by Mendès France and proclaimed in March 1956. Meanwhile, in Algeria some 350,000 French troops were fighting 150,000 combatants of the Algerian Liberation Movement (FLN). Within a few years, the Algerian war of independence reached a summit in terms of bloodshed, which threatened to spill into metropolitan France.

Between 1946 and 1958, the Fourth Republic had 24 separate ministries. Frustrated by the endless divisiveness, de Gaulle famously asked, "How can you govern a country which has 246 varieties of cheese?"

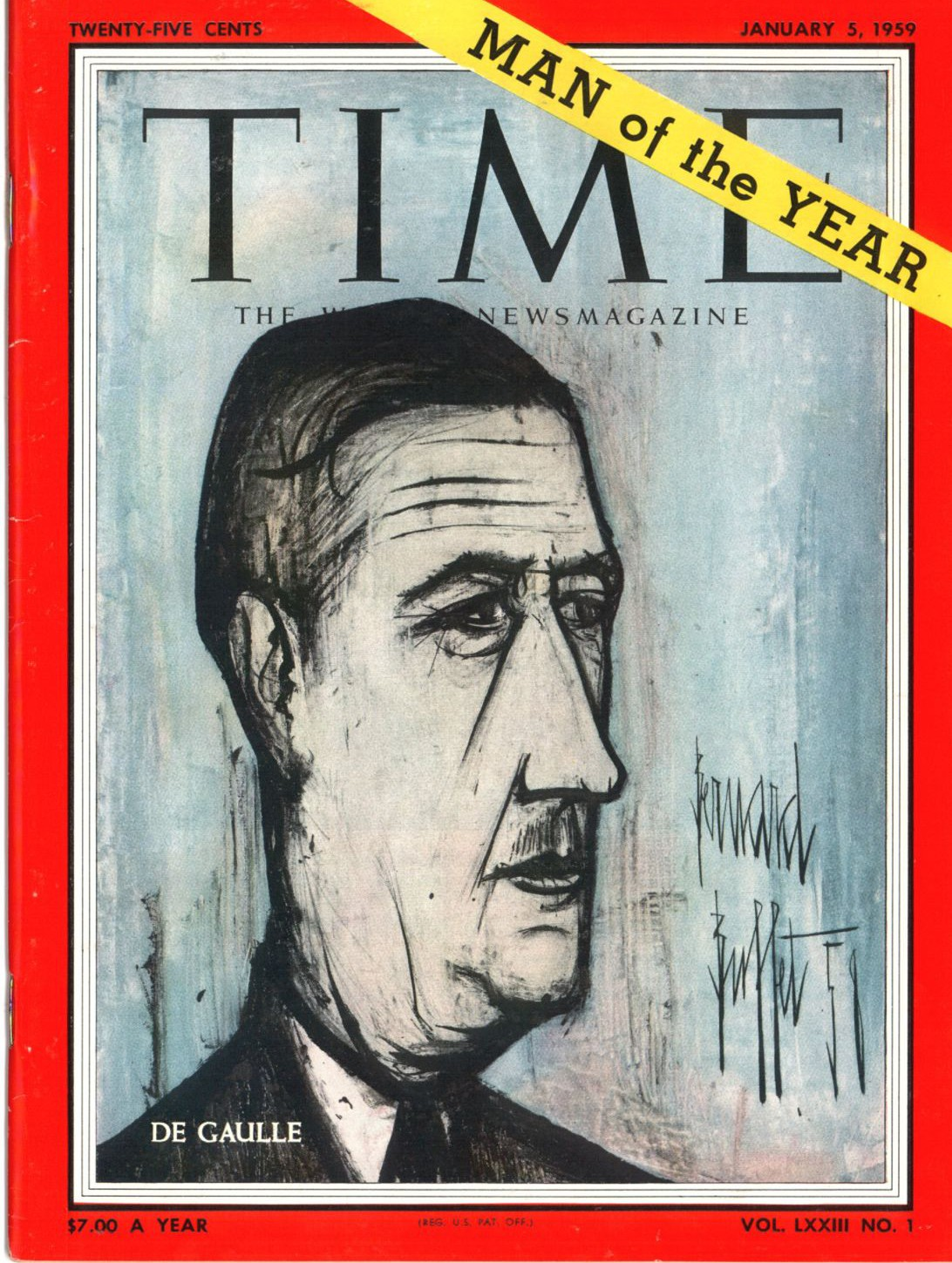
1958 Time Man of the Year cover (portrait by Bernard Buffet)

=== 1958: Collapse of the Fourth Republic ===
The Fourth Republic was wracked by political instability, failures in Indochina, and an inability to resolve the Algerian War for independence.

On 13 May 1958, Pieds-noirs settlers (people of French descent, born in Algeria) seized the government buildings in Algiers, attacking what they saw as French government weakness in prosecuting the war against the FLN. A "Committee of Civil and Army Public Security" was created under the presidency of General Jacques Massu, a Gaullist sympathiser. General Raoul Salan, Commander-in-Chief in Algeria, announced on radio that he was assuming provisional power and appealed for confidence.

At a press conference on 19 May, de Gaulle asserted that he was at the disposal of the country. As a journalist expressed the concerns of some who feared that he would violate civil liberties, de Gaulle retorted: "Have I ever done that? On the contrary, I have re-established them when they had disappeared. Who honestly believes that, at age 67, I would start a career as a dictator?" A constitutionalist by conviction, he maintained that he would accept power only from the lawfully constituted authorities. De Gaulle did not wish to repeat the difficulty the Free French movement experienced in establishing legitimacy as the rightful government. He told an aide that the rebel generals "will not find de Gaulle in their baggage".

The crisis deepened as French paratroopers from Algeria seized Corsica and a landing near Paris was discussed (Operation Resurrection).

Political leaders on many sides agreed to support de Gaulle's return to power, except François Mitterrand, Pierre Mendès France, Alain Savary, the Communist Party, and certain other leftists.

On 29 May, the French President, René Coty, told parliament that the nation was on the brink of civil war, so he was

"turning towards the most illustrious of Frenchmen, towards the man who, in the darkest years of our history, was our chief for the reconquest of freedom and who refused dictatorship in order to re-establish the Republic. I ask General de Gaulle to confer with the head of state and to examine with him what, in the framework of Republican legality, is necessary for the immediate formation of a government of national safety and what can be done, in a fairly short time, for a deep reform of our institutions."

De Gaulle accepted Coty's proposal under the condition that a new constitution would be introduced, creating a powerful presidency in which a sole executive, the first of which was to be himself, ruled for seven-year periods. Another condition was that he be granted extraordinary powers for a period of six months.

De Gaulle remained intent on replacing the weak constitution of the Fourth Republic. He is sometimes described as the author of the new constitution, as he commissioned it and was responsible for its overall framework. The actual drafter of the text was Michel Debré, who wrote out de Gaulle's political ideas and guided the text through the enactment process. On 1 June 1958, de Gaulle became prime minister and was given emergency powers for six months by the National Assembly, fulfilling his desire for parliamentary legitimacy.

De Gaulle's cabinet received strong support from right-wing parties, split support from left of center parties, and strong opposition from the Communist Party. In the vote on 1 June 1958, 329 votes were cast in favor and 224 against, out of 593 deputies. On 28 September 1958, a referendum took place and 82.6 percent of those who voted supported the new constitution and the creation of the Fifth Republic. The colonies (Algeria was officially a part of France, not a colony) were given the choice between immediate independence and the new constitution. All African colonies voted for the new constitution and the replacement of the French Union by the French Community, except Guinea, which became the first French African colony to gain independence.

== 1958–1969: Return to power ==
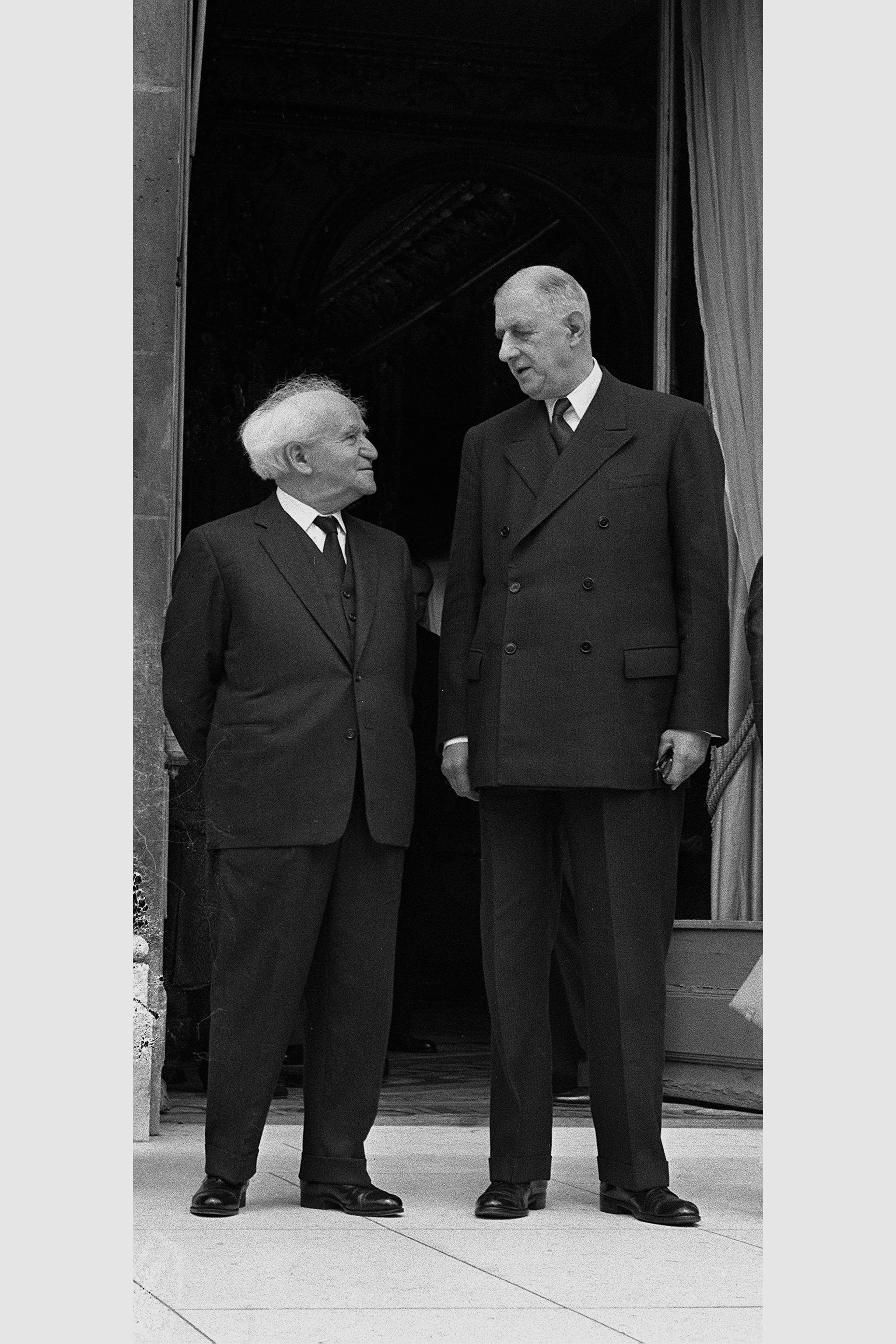
The first meeting between David Ben-Gurion and de Gaulle at the Élysée Palace, 1960

In the November 1958 election, Charles de Gaulle and his supporters (initially the Union pour la nouvelle République - Union démocratique du travail, then the Union des démocrates pour la Cinquième République, later still the Union des Démocrates pour la République, UDR) won a comfortable majority. On 21 December, he was elected President of France and was inaugurated in January 1959. As head of state, he became ex officio the Co-Prince of Andorra.

De Gaulle oversaw economic measures to revitalise the country, including the issuing of a new franc. Less than a year after taking office, he was confronted with national tragedy after the Malpasset Dam in Var collapsed in early December, killing over 400 people. Internationally, he rebuffed both the United States and the Soviet Union, pushed for an independent France with its own nuclear weapons, and strongly encouraged a "Free Europe", believing that a confederation of all European nations would restore the past glories of the great European empires.

He set about building Franco-German cooperation as the cornerstone of the European Economic Community (EEC), paying a state visit to West Germany in September 1962: the first to Germany by a French head of state since Napoleon. In January 1963, West Germany and France signed a treaty of friendship, known as the Élysée Treaty. France also decreased its dollar reserves, trading them for gold from the United States to reduce American economic influence abroad.

On 23 November 1959, in a speech in Strasbourg, de Gaulle announced his vision for Europe:

Oui, c'est l'Europe, depuis l'Atlantique jusqu'à l'Oural, c'est toute l'Europe, qui décidera du destin du monde.

Yes, it is Europe, from the Atlantic to the Urals, it is the whole of Europe, that will decide the destiny of the world.

His expression, "Europe, from the Atlantic to the Urals", has often been cited throughout the history of European integration. His vision stood in contrast to the Atlanticism of the United States and Britain, since he preferred a Europe that would act as a third pole between the United States and the Soviet Union. As the last chief of government of the Fourth Republic, de Gaulle ensured that the Treaty of Rome, which created the European Economic Community, was fully implemented and that the British project of a Free Trade Area was rejected, to the extent that he was sometimes considered as a "Father of Europe".

=== Algeria ===
The French Community in 1959

Upon becoming president, de Gaulle was faced with the urgent task of ending the bloody and divisive war in Algeria. Although the military's near-coup had contributed to his return to power, de Gaulle soon ordered all officers to quit the rebellious Committees of Public Safety. Such actions greatly angered the pieds-noirs and their military supporters.

De Gaulle faced uprisings in Algeria by the pied-noirs and the French armed forces. Upon assuming the role of prime minister in June 1958, he immediately went to Algeria and neutralised the army there. For the long term, he devised a plan to modernize Algeria's traditional economy, deescalated the war, and offered Algeria self-determination in 1959. A pied-noir revolt in 1960 failed, and another attempted coup failed in April 1961. French voters approved his course in a 1961 referendum on Algerian self-determination. De Gaulle arranged a cease-fire in Algeria with the March 1962 Évian Accords, legitimated by another referendum a month later. It gave victory to the FLN, which declared independence.

Prime Minister Michel Debré resigned over the final settlement and was replaced with Georges Pompidou. On 3 July 1962, France offically recognised Algerian independence, and a blanket amnesty law was belatedly voted in 1968, covering all crimes committed by the French army during the war. In just a few months in 1962, 900,000 pied-noirs left the country. The exodus accelerated after July 5, in the wake of the French deaths during the Oran massacre of 1962.

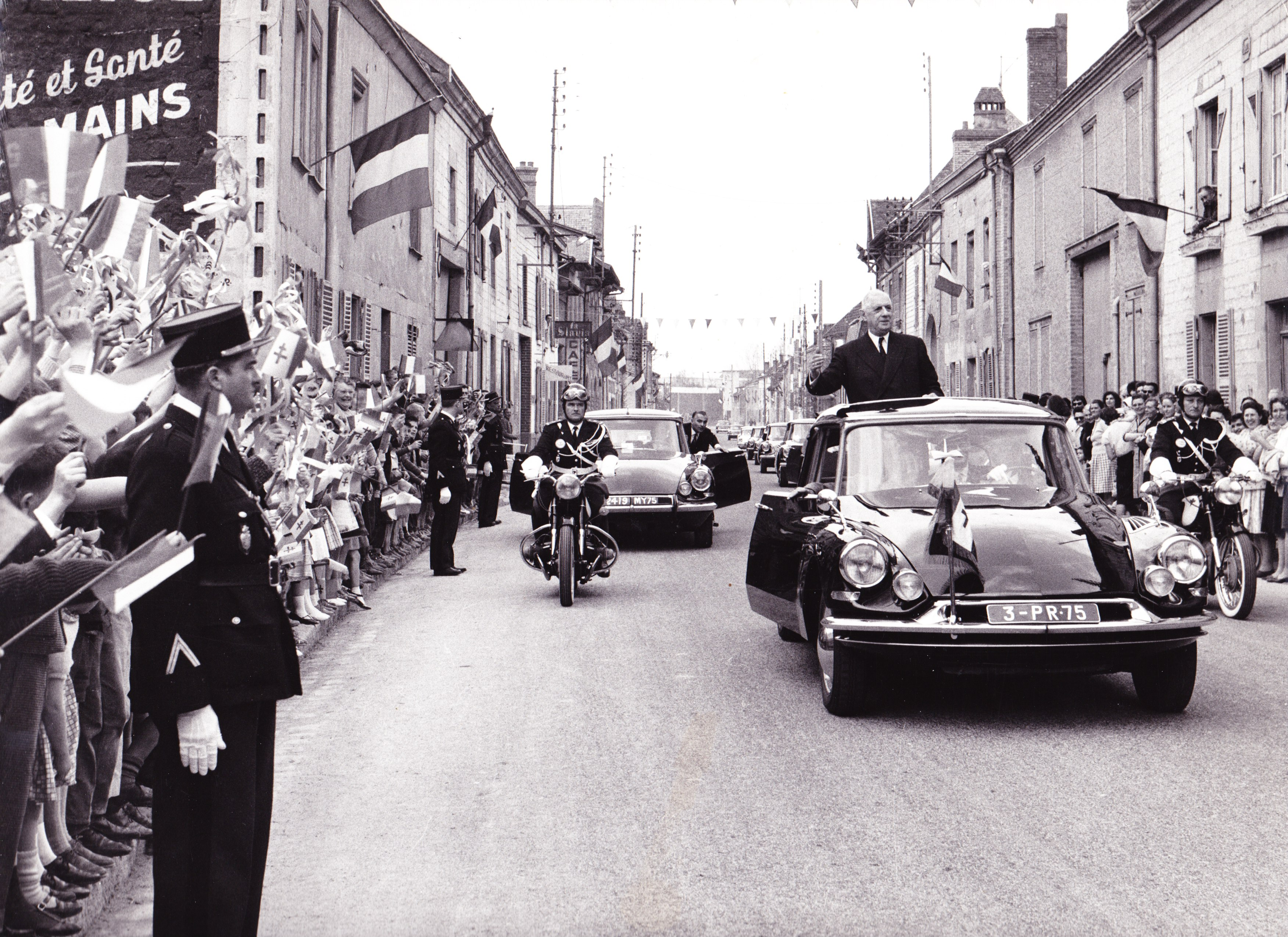
Charles de Gaulle's motorcade passes through Isles-sur-Suippe (Marne). The president salutes the crowd from his famous Citroën DS.

=== Assassination attempts ===
De Gaulle was targeted for death by the Organisation armée secrète (OAS) in retaliation for his Algerian initiatives. Several assassination attempts were made, and it is claimed that there were at least 30 assassination attempts against de Gaulle throughout his lifetime. One such assassination attempt occurred on 22 August 1962, when he and his wife narrowly escaped from an organized machine gun ambush on their Citroën DS limousine. The attack was arranged by Colonel Jean-Marie Bastien-Thiry at Petit-Clamart.

There were also rumors of CIA involvement in the targeting of de Gaulle for assassination.

=== Direct presidential elections ===
In September 1962, de Gaulle sought a constitutional amendment to allow the president to be directly elected by the people and issued another referendum to this end. After a motion of censure was voted by the parliament on 4 October 1962, de Gaulle dissolved the National Assembly and held new elections. The Gaullists won an increased majority.

On 28 October 1962, de Gaulle's proposal to change the election procedure for the French presidency was approved at the referendum; thereafter the president was to be elected by direct universal suffrage for the first time since Louis Napoleon in 1848.

In December 1965, de Gaulle returned as president for a second seven-year term.

=== "Thirty glorious years" ===
With the Algerian conflict behind him, de Gaulle was able to achieve his two main objectives: the reform and development of the French economy, and the promotion of an independent foreign policy and a strong presence on the international stage. This was named by foreign observers the "politics of grandeur".

In the immediate post-war years, France was in poor shape: wages remained at around half their prewar levels; the winter of 1946–1947 did extensive damage to crops, leading to a reduction in the bread ration; hunger and disease remained rife; and the black market continued to flourish. Germany was in an even worse position, but the situation began to improve significantly after 1948 with the introduction of aid from the Marshall Plan—large scale American financial assistance given to help rebuild European economies and infrastructure. This laid the foundations of a meticulously planned program of investments in energy, transport, and heavy industry, overseen by the government of Prime Minister Georges Pompidou.

Aided by these projects, the French economy recorded growth rates unrivalled since the 19th century. In 1964, for the first time in nearly 100 years France's GDP overtook that of the United Kingdom for a time. This period is remembered in France as the peak of the Trente Glorieuses ("Thirty Glorious Years" of economic growth between 1945 and 1974).

=== Fourth nuclear power ===
As early as April 1954, de Gaulle argued that France must have its own nuclear arsenal. In late 1954, full-scale research began again when Prime Minister Pierre Mendès France authorized a plan to develop the atomic bomb. France's independent Force de Frappe (strike force) came into being soon after de Gaulle's election with his authorization for the first nuclear test.

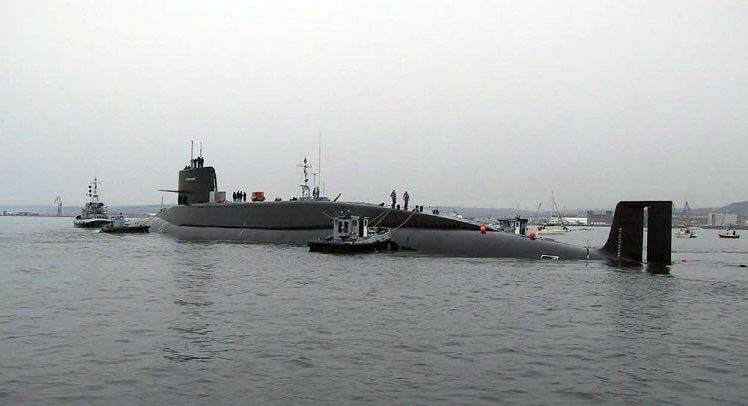
The Redoutable, the first French nuclear missile submarine

With the cancellation of the British Blue Streak programme, the US agreed to supply Britain with its Skybolt, and later Polaris, weapons systems, and in 1958, the two nations signed the Mutual Defence Agreement. Although at the time it was still a full member of NATO, France proceeded to develop its own independent nuclear technologies, which would enable it to become a partner in any reprisals and would give it a voice in matters of atomic control.

After six years of effort, on 13 February 1960, France became the world's fourth nuclear power, detonating a plutonium-fueled nuclear device in a test called Gerboise Bleue near Reggane, French Algeria, in the Sahara. In August 1963, France decided against signing the Partial Test Ban Treaty because it would have prohibited it from testing nuclear weapons above ground. France continued to carry out tests at the Algerian site until 1966, under an agreement with the newly independent Algeria. France's testing program then moved to the Mururoa and Fangataufa Atolls in the South Pacific. In August 1968, the first French thermonuclear device was tested in Fangataufa.

In November 1967, an article by the French Chief of the General Staff (but inspired by de Gaulle) in the Revue de la Défense Nationale caused international consternation; it was stated that the French nuclear force should be capable of firing "in all directions"—thus even including America as a potential target. This surprising statement was intended as a declaration of French national independence and was in retaliation to a warning issued long ago by Dean Rusk that US missiles would be aimed at France if it attempted to employ atomic weapons outside an agreed plan. However, criticism of de Gaulle was growing over his tendency to act alone with little regard for the views of others.

=== Foreign policy ===
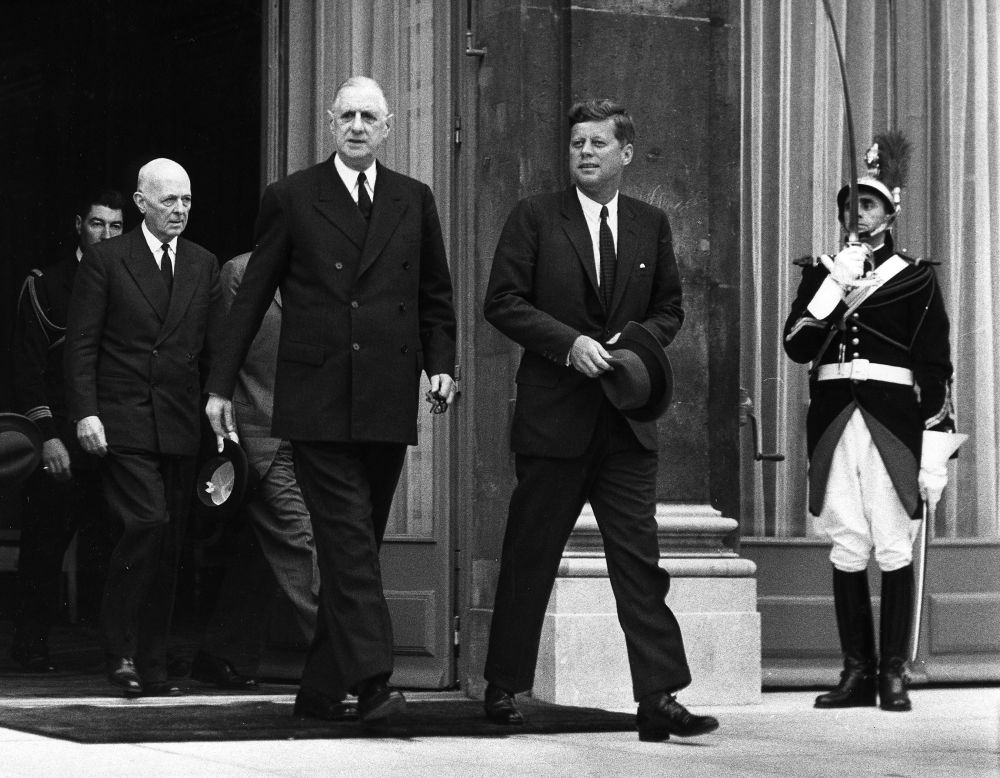
President John F. Kennedy and de Gaulle at the conclusion of their talks at Elysee Palace, 1961

On 17 May 1960, De Gaulle hosted a superpower summit for arms limitation talks and détente efforts in the wake of the 1960 U-2 incident between United States President Dwight Eisenhower, Soviet Premier Nikita Khrushchev, and United Kingdom Prime Minister Harold Macmillan. When Khrushchev condemned the United States U-2 flights, de Gaulle expressed to Khrushchev his disapproval of 18 near-simultaneous secret Soviet satellite overflights of French territory; Khrushchev denied knowledge of the overflights. Lieutenant General Vernon A. Walters was struck by de Gaulle's "unconditional support" of the United States during that "crucial time". De Gaulle then tried to revive the talks by inviting all the delegates to another conference at the Élysée Palace to discuss the situation, but the summit ultimately dissolved in the wake of the U-2 incident.

In February 1966, France withdrew from the NATO Military Command Structure but remained within the organisation. De Gaulle wanted France to remain the master of the decisions affecting it; he also ordered all foreign military personnel to leave France within a year. This latter action, in particular, was poorly received in the US.

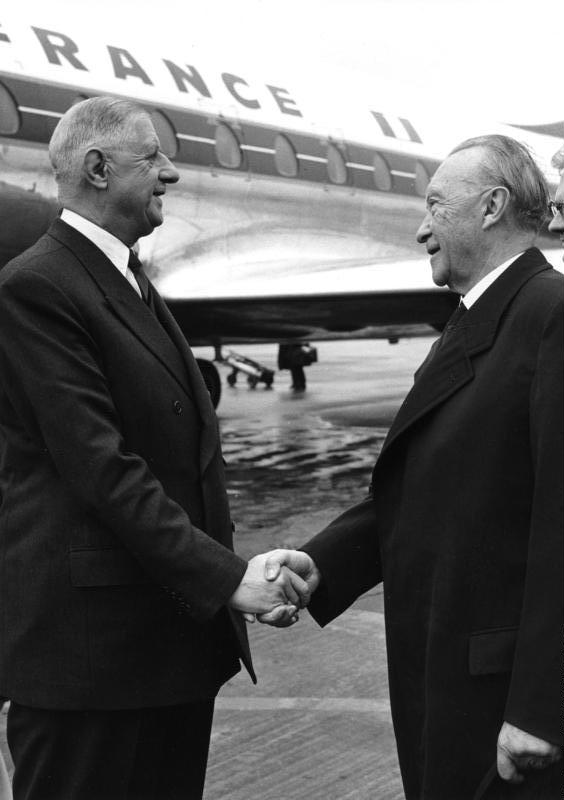
De Gaulle and Konrad Adenauer in 1961

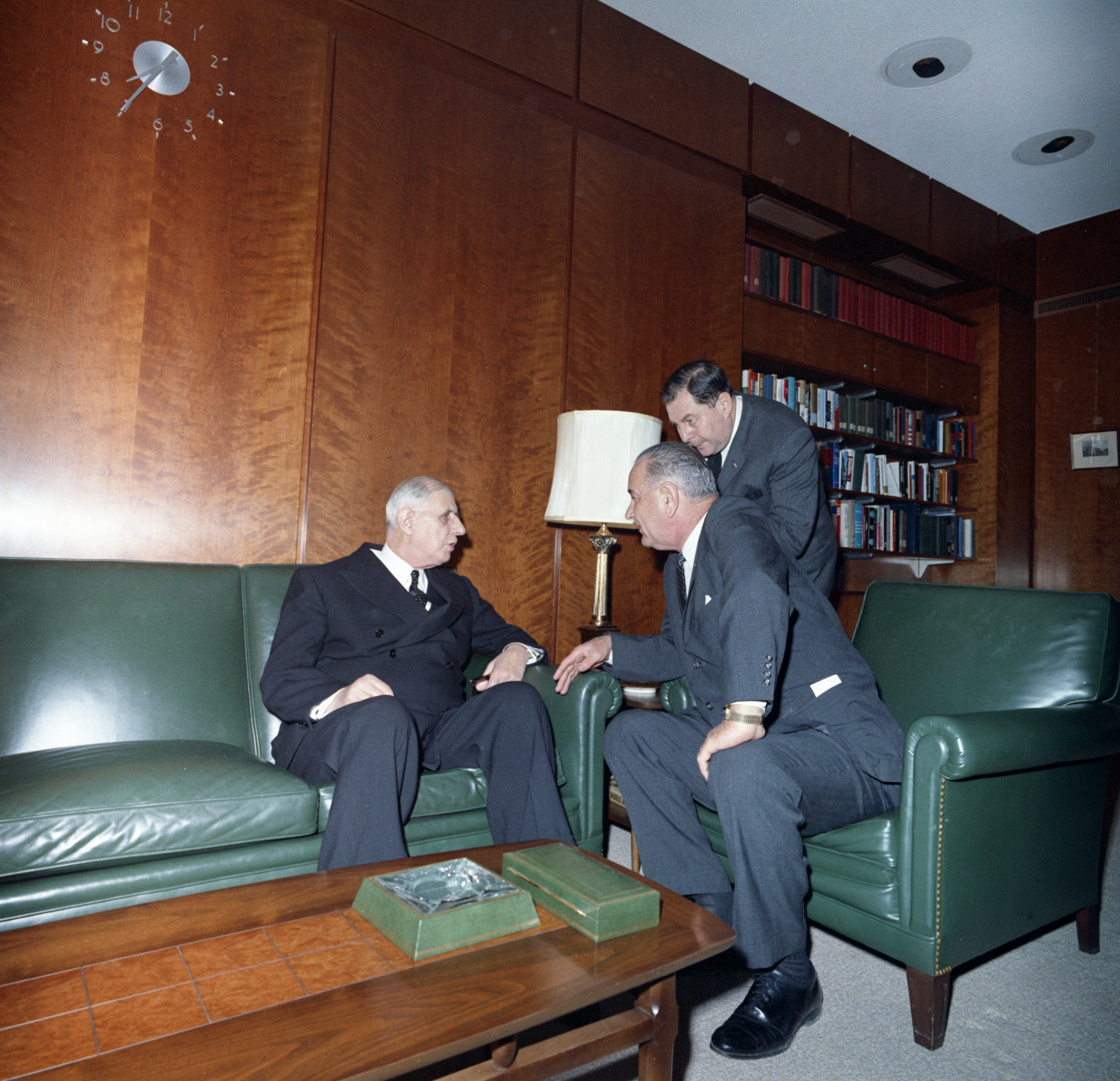
De Gaulle with President Lyndon B. Johnson in Washington, D.C., 1963

De Gaulle established a good relationship with West German Chancellor Konrad Adenauer—culminating in the Élysée Treaty in 1963—and in the first few years of the European Economic Community (EEC), France's industrial exports to the other five members tripled and its farm export almost quadrupled. The franc became a solid, stable currency for the first time in half a century, and the economy mostly boomed. De Gaulle vetoed the British application to join the EEC in 1963, and again in June 1967. In June 1965, after France and the other five members could not agree, de Gaulle withdrew France's representatives from the EEC. Their absence left the organisation essentially unable to run its affairs until the Luxembourg compromise was reached in January 1966. De Gaulle succeeded in influencing the decision-making mechanism written into the Treaty of Rome by insisting on solidarity founded on mutual understanding.

In January 1964, France was among the first of the major Western powers (after the UK) to open diplomatic relations with the People's Republic of China (PRC). By recognizing Mao Zedong's government, de Gaulle signaled to both Washington and Moscow that France intended to deploy an independent foreign policy. The move was criticized in the United States, as it seemed to seriously damage the US policy of containment in Asia. De Gaulle justified this action by "the weight of evidence and reason", considering that China's demographic weight and geographic extent put it in a position to have a global leading role. De Gaulle also used the opportunity to arouse the rivalry between the USSR and China. De Gaulle sought to neutralize Vietnam to resolve the political and military conflict there—a move South Vietnam and the US deemed unrealistic and likely to be exploited by the North. Consequently, South Vietnam severed diplomatic relations with France on 24 June 1965. (Note: South Vietnam and France restored diplomatic relations on 13 April 1973.) In September 1966, in a famous speech in Phnom Penh in Cambodia, he expressed France's disapproval of the US involvement in the Vietnam War, calling for a withdrawal.

With tension rising in the Middle East in 1967, de Gaulle declared an arms embargo against Israel on 2 June, just three days before the outbreak of the Six-Day War; however, it did not affect spare parts for the French military hardware with which the Israeli armed forces were equipped. Under de Gaulle, following the independence of Algeria, France embarked on foreign policy more favorable to the Arab side. President de Gaulle's position in 1967, at the time of the Six-Day War, played a part in France's new-found popularity in the Arab world. In his letter to David Ben-Gurion dated 9 January 1968, de Gaulle expressed conviction that Israel had ignored his warnings and overstepped the bounds of moderation by taking the territory of neighbouring countries by force, believing that it amounted to annexation, and that he considered withdrawing from these areas to be the best course of action.

Under de Gaulle's leadership, France supported the breakaway Republic of Biafra against the Nigerian government during the Nigerian Civil War. Although French arms helped to keep Biafra in action for the final 15 months of the civil war, its involvement was seen as insufficient and counterproductive. The Biafran chief of staff stated that the French "did more harm than good by raising false hopes and by providing the British with an excuse to reinforce Nigeria." More generally, one of de Gaulle's priorities was maintaining and further expanding French economic and political power in its former colonies. This was done not only through official diplomacy and the External Documentation and Counter-Espionage Service (Service de documentation extérieure et de contre-espionnage, SDECE), but also through bridge figures such as de Gaulle's close confidant Jacques Foccart. The latter built up a network of informal relations with authoritarian leaders (most notably Omar Bongo, Félix Houphouët-Boigny, and Léopold Sédar Senghor) throughout French-speaking Africa.

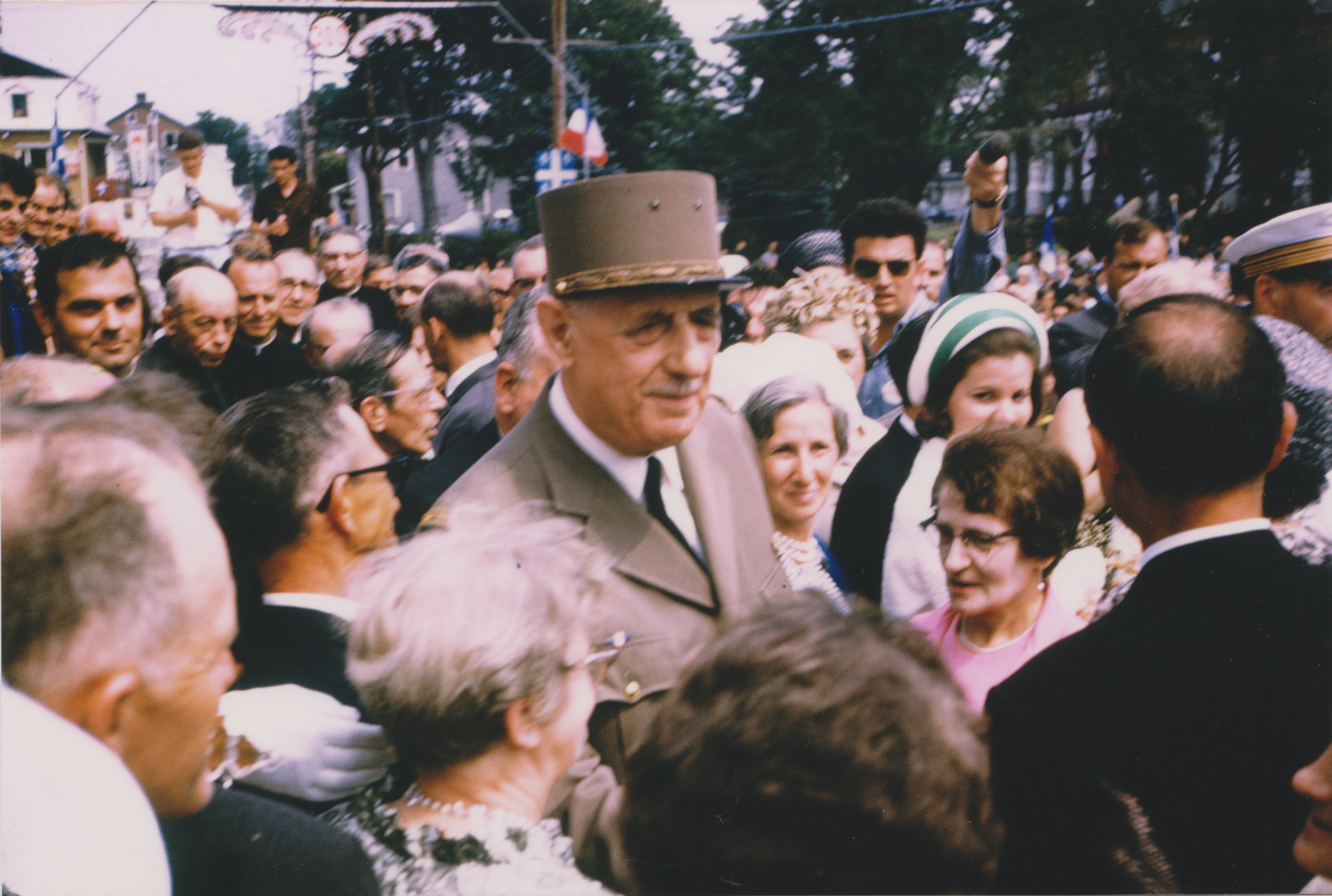
General Charles de Gaulle on the Chemin du Roy, Sainte-Anne-de-la-Pérade, 1967

In July 1967, at the end of a speech given at the Expo 67 world's fair in Montreal, de Gaulle shouted "Vive le Québec libre! Vive le Canada français! Et vive la France!" (Long live free Quebec! Long live French Canada! And long live France!) to a large crowd from a balcony at Montreal's city hall. De Gaulle abruptly left Canada two days later; the speech was heavily criticized in both Canada and France, but was seen as a watershed moment by the Quebec sovereignty movement.

=== May 1968 and resignation ===
De Gaulle's government was criticized within France, particularly for its heavy-handed style. While the written press and elections were free, and private stations such as Europe 1 were able to broadcast in French from abroad, the state's Office de radiodiffusion-télévision française (French Radio and Television Broadcasting Office, ORTF) had a monopoly on television and radio. This monopoly meant the government was in a position to directly influence broadcast news. In many respects, de Gaulle's government was conservative, Catholic, and there were few women in high-level political posts (in May 1968, the government's ministers were 100% male).

In May 1968, mass demonstrations and strikes in France severely challenged de Gaulle's legitimacy. He and other government leaders feared that the country was on the brink of revolution or civil war. On 29 May, de Gaulle fled to Baden-Baden in Germany to meet with General Massu, head of the French military there, to discuss possible army intervention. De Gaulle returned to France after being assured of the military's support, in return for which De Gaulle agreed to amnesty for the 1961 coup plotters and OAS members.

In a private meeting discussing the students' and workers' demands for direct participation in business and government, de Gaulle coined the phrase "La réforme oui, la chienlit non", which can be politely translated as "reform yes, chaos no": it was a vernacular scatological pun, with "chie-en-lit, non" effectively meaning "shit-in-bed, no". The term is now common parlance in French political commentary.

However, de Gaulle did offer to accept some of the reforms the demonstrators sought. He again considered a referendum to support his moves, but on 30 May, Pompidou persuaded him to dissolve parliament and hold new elections. The June 1968 elections were a major success for the Gaullist Union for the Defence of the Republic: the party won 352 of 487 seats, but de Gaulle remained personally unpopular.

De Gaulle resigned the presidency at noon on 28 April 1969, following the rejection of his proposed reform of the Senate and local governments in a nationwide referendum. Two months later, Georges Pompidou was elected as his successor.

== Later life ==
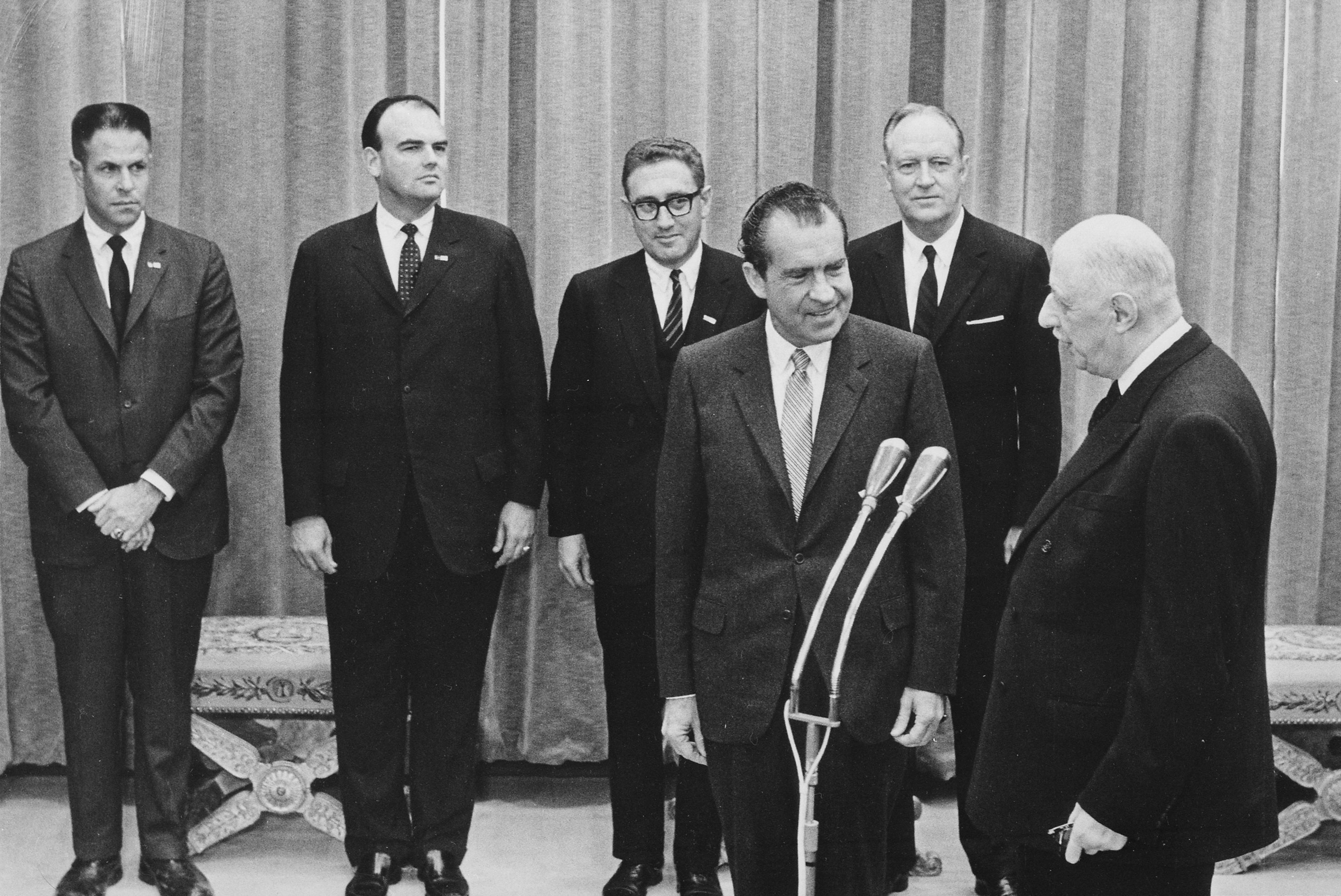
Newly inaugurated U.S. president Richard Nixon visiting President De Gaulle one month before De Gaulle's retirement

=== Retirement ===
De Gaulle retired once again to his nine-acre country estate, La Boisserie ("The Woodland Glade"), in Colombey-les-Deux-Églises, 193 kilometres (120 mi) southeast of Paris. There, the General, who often described old age as a "shipwreck", continued his memoirs by dictating to his secretary from notes. To visitors, de Gaulle said, "I will finish three books, if God grants me life". The Renewal, the first of three planned volumes to be called Memoirs of Hope, was finished and became the fastest seller in French publishing history.

=== Death ===
On the evening of 9 November 1970, De Gaulle, who had generally enjoyed good health in his lifetime, died suddenly from an abdominal aortic aneurysm while watching the news on television. His wife asked that she be allowed to inform her family before the news was released. De Gaulle's former prime minister and presidential successor Georges Pompidou, who was informed early the next day, announced the general's death on television by saying simply, "General de Gaulle is dead. France is a widow."

De Gaulle had insisted his funeral be held at Colombey, and that no presidents or ministers attend—only his Compagnons de la Libération. Since a large number of foreign dignitaries wanted to honour de Gaulle, Pompidou arranged a separate memorial service at the Notre-Dame cathedral, to be held at the same time as the actual funeral.

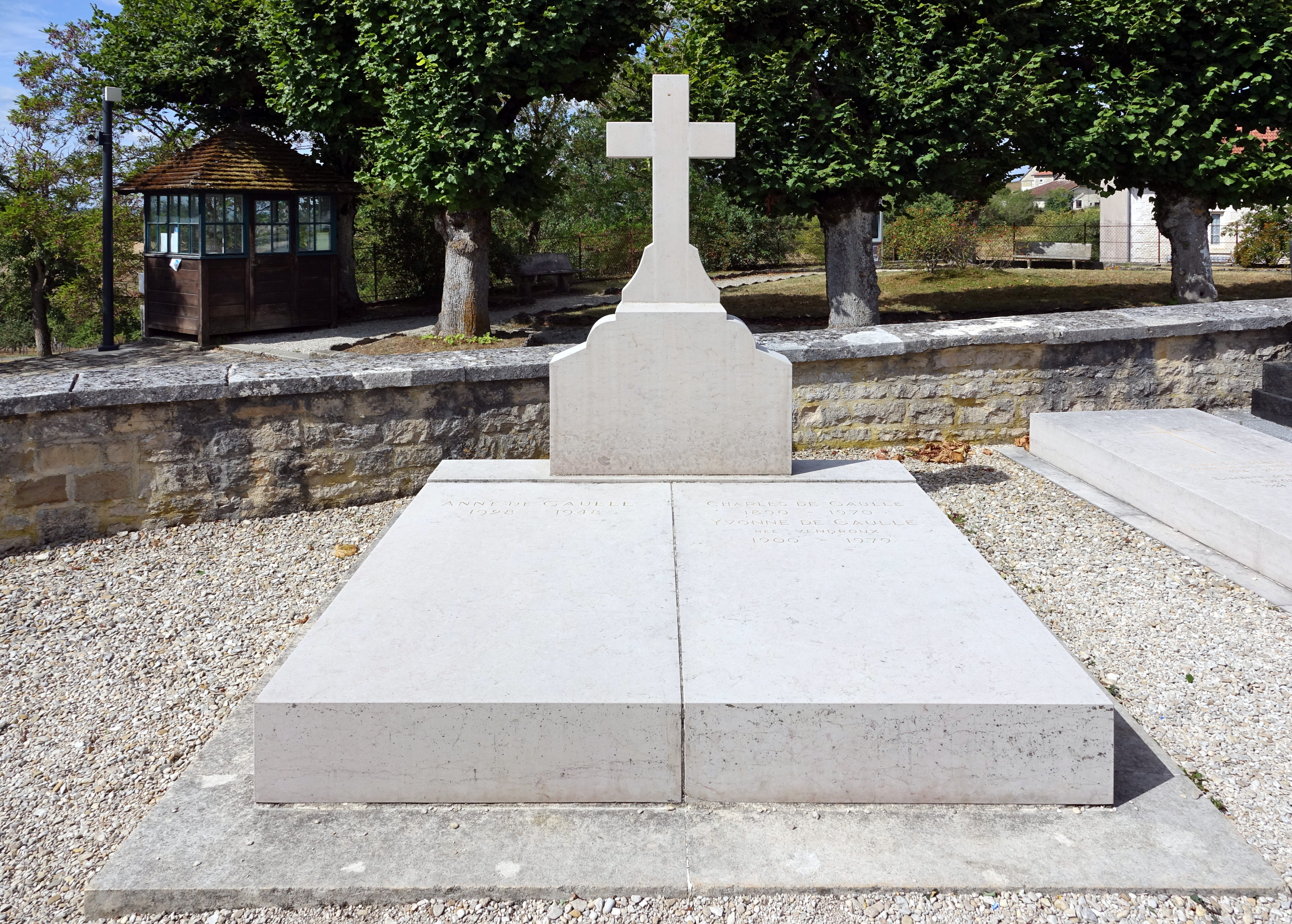
Grave of Charles de Gaulle at Colombey-les-Deux-Églises

The funeral on 12 November 1970 was the biggest such event in French history and a national day of mourning was declared. Thousands of guests attended, included Pompidou, U.S. president Richard Nixon, British prime minister Edward Heath and Prince Charles, UN secretary-general U Thant, Soviet statesman Nikolai Podgorny, Italian president Giuseppe Saragat, West German chancellor Willy Brandt, and Queen Juliana of the Netherlands. His body was conveyed to the church on a turretless Panhard EBR armored car, and was carried to his grave, next to his daughter Anne, by eight young men of Colombey. As the coffin was lowered into the ground, the bells of all the churches in France tolled, starting from Notre Dame and spreading out from there.

De Gaulle specified that his tombstone bear the simple inscription of his name and his years of birth and death.

== Personal life ==
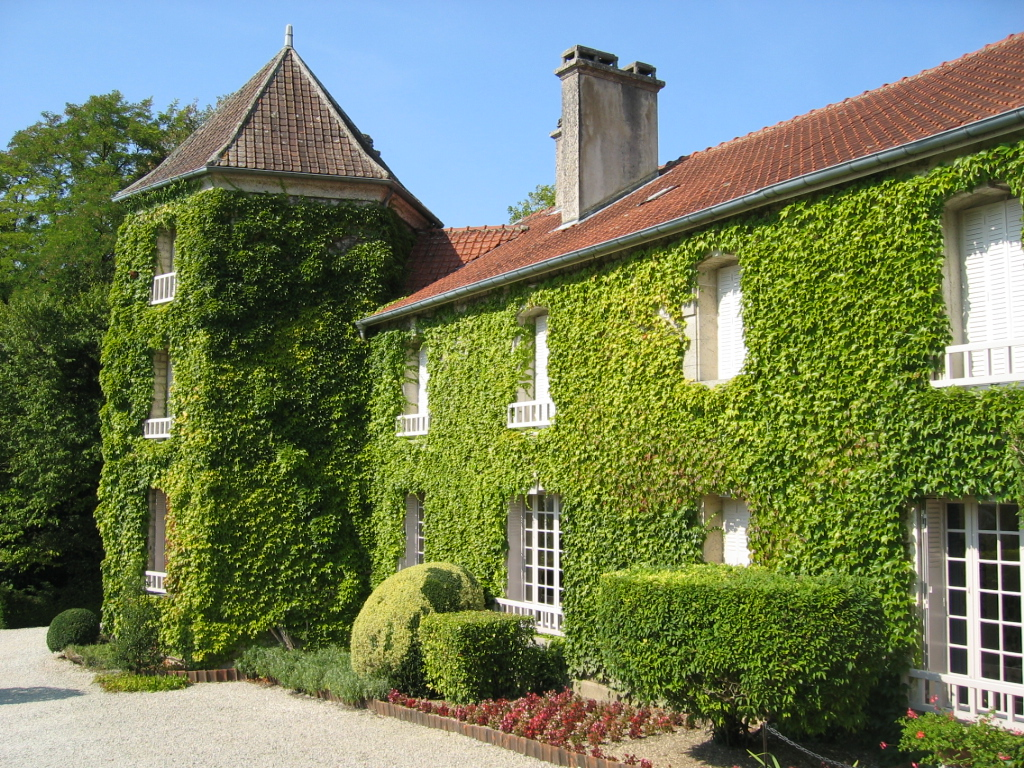
De Gaulle's home, La Boisserie, in Colombey-les-Deux-Églises

De Gaulle married Yvonne Vendroux on 7 April 1921 in Église Notre-Dame de Calais. They had three children: Philippe (1921–2024), Élisabeth (1924–2013), who married General Alain de Boissieu, and Anne (1928–1948). Anne had Down syndrome and died of pneumonia at the age of 20.

De Gaulle always had a particular love for his daughter Anne: one Colombey resident recalled how he used to walk with her hand-in-hand around the property, talking quietly about the things she understood. He retained the service of a nun, Marguerite Potel, for the care of Anne.

De Gaulle had an older brother Xavier, an older sister Marie-Agnes, and two younger brothers, Jacques and Pierre.

One of de Gaulle's grandsons, also named Charles de Gaulle, was a member of the European Parliament from 1994 to 2004, his last tenure being for the far-right National Front. The younger Charles de Gaulle's move to the anti-Gaullist National Front was widely condemned by other family members: "It was like hearing the Pope had converted to Islam", one said. Jean de Gaulle, Another grandson, was a member of the French parliament for the centre-right Union for a Popular Movement until his retirement in 2007.

== Legacy ==
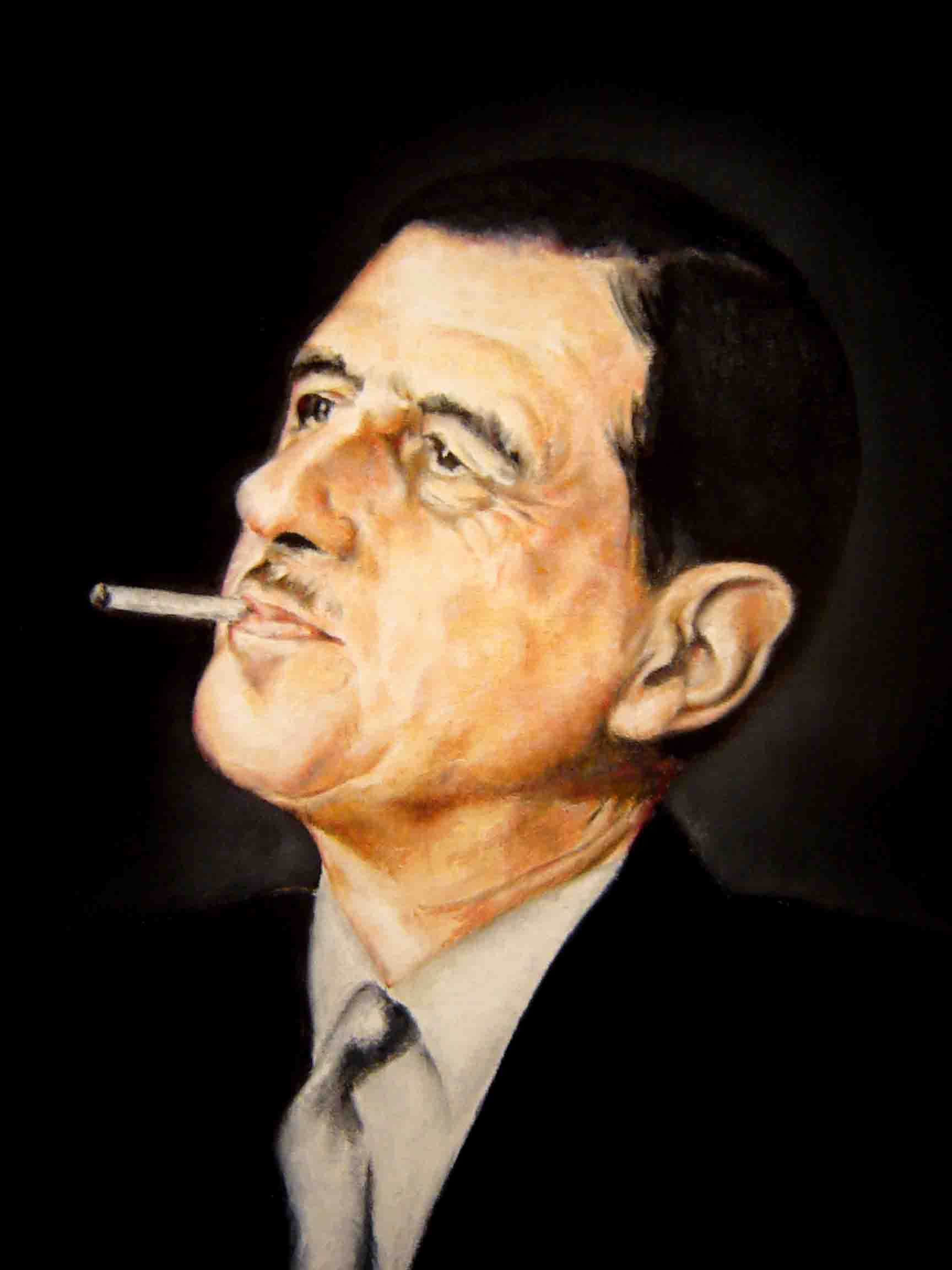
Portrait by Donald Sheridan

=== Reputation ===
De Gaulle made 31 regional tours during his presidency, visiting every French department. For many small towns, the visit was an important moment in their local history. He enjoyed entering the welcoming crowds; an aide noted how often people said, "he saw me" or "he touched me", and another recalled how a mother begged de Gaulle for the royal touch on her baby. Both supporters and opponents surmised that de Gaulle was a monarch-like figure for the French.

Historians have accorded Napoleon I and de Gaulle the top-ranking status of French historical leaders of the 19th and 20th centuries. According to a 2005 survey, carried out in the context of the tenth anniversary of the death of president François Mitterrand, 35 percent of respondents said Mitterrand was the best French president ever, followed by Charles de Gaulle (30 percent) and Jacques Chirac (12 percent). Another poll by BVA four years later showed that 87% of French people regarded his presidency positively.

Charles De Gaulle Monument in Warsaw, Poland (unveiled in 2005)

Statues honouring de Gaulle have been erected outside of France, such as in London, in Warsaw, in Moscow, in Bucharest and in Quebec City. The first Algerian president, Ahmed Ben Bella, said that de Gaulle was the "military leader who brought us the hardest blows" prior to Algerian independence, but "saw further" than other politicians, and had a "universal dimension that is too often lacking in current leaders." Likewise, Léopold Sédar Senghor, the first president of Senegal, said that few Western leaders could boast of having risked their lives to grant a colony independence. De Gaulle was admired by the US President Richard Nixon: after a meeting at the Palace of Versailles just before the de Gaulle left office, Nixon declared, "He did not try to put on airs but an aura of majesty seemed to envelop him ... his performance—and I do not use that word disparagingly—was breathtaking." Upon arriving for de Gaulle's funeral, Nixon said of him, "greatness knows no national boundaries".

In 1990, President Mitterrand, de Gaulle's old political rival, presided over the celebrations to mark the 100th anniversary of his birth. Mitterrand, who once wrote a vitriolic critique of him called the "Permanent Coup d'État", quoted a recent opinion poll, saying, "As General de Gaulle, he has entered the pantheon of great national heroes, where he ranks ahead of Napoleon and behind only Charlemagne." Under the influence of Jean-Pierre Chevènement, the leader of CERES (the left-wing and sovereignist faction of the Socialist Party), Mitterrand had, except on certain economic and social policies, rallied to much of Gaullism. Between the mid-1970s and mid-1990s, there developed a left-right consensus, dubbed "Gaullo-Mitterrandism", behind the "French status" in NATO: i.e., outside the integrated military command.

A number of commentators have been critical of de Gaulle's failure to prevent the massacres after Algerian independence, while others take the view that the struggle had been so long and savage that such reprisals were inevitable. The Australian historian Brian Crozier wrote, "that he was able to part with Algeria without civil war was a great though negative achievement which in all probability would have been beyond the capacity of any other leader France possessed."

De Gaulle was an excellent user of the media, as seen in his shrewd use of television to persuade around 80% of Metropolitan France to approve the new constitution for the Fifth Republic. He afterwards enjoyed massive approval ratings, and once said that "every Frenchman is, has been or will be Gaullist." While president, the nightly news almost always began by describing his activities. A cabinet minister said, "La télévision, c'est le gouvernement dans la salle-à-manger" (roughly translated: "The television is the government in the dining room").

De Gaulle's views did not necessarily always reflect mainstream French public opinion: his vetos of the UK's entry into the European Economic Community (EEC) in 1963 and 1967 contradicts the decisive majority the French people returned in the 1972 referendum on the matter. His early influence in setting the parameters of the EEC can still be seen, most notably with the controversial Common Agricultural Policy.

Some writers take the view that Pompidou was a more progressive and influential leader than de Gaulle because, though also a Gaullist, he was less autocratic and more interested in social reforms. Although he followed the main tenets of de Gaulle's foreign policy, he was also keen to work towards warmer relations with the United States.

In 1968, shortly before leaving office, de Gaulle refused to devalue the Franc on grounds of national prestige, but upon taking over, Pompidou reversed the decision almost immediately. During the financial crisis of 1968, France had to rely on American (and West German) financial aid to shore up the economy.

Perry has written that:

[the] events of 1968 illustrated the brittleness of de Gaulle's rule. That he was taken by surprise is an indictment of his rule; he was too remote from real life and had no interest in the conditions under which ordinary French people lived. Problems like inadequate housing and social services had been ignored. The French greeted the news of his departure with some relief as the feeling had grown that he had outlived his usefulness. Perhaps he clung onto power too long, perhaps he should have retired in 1965 when he was still popular.

British journalist Brian Crozier said, "the fame of de Gaulle outstrips his achievements, he chose to make repeated gestures of petulance and defiance that weakened the west without compensating advantages to France".

French journalist Régis Debray called de Gaulle "super-lucide" and pointed out that virtually all of his predictions, such as the fall of communism, the reunification of Germany, and the resurrection of "old" Russia, came true after his death. Debray compared him with Napoleon ("the great political myth of the 19th century"), calling de Gaulle his 20th-century equivalent.

While de Gaulle had many admirers, he was also one of the most despised men in modern French history by his critics.

=== Memorial ===
A number of monuments have been built to commemorate de Gaulle. France's largest airport, located in Roissy, outside Paris, is named Charles de Gaulle Airport. France's flagship nuclear-powered aircraft carrier is also named after him.

== Honours and awards ==
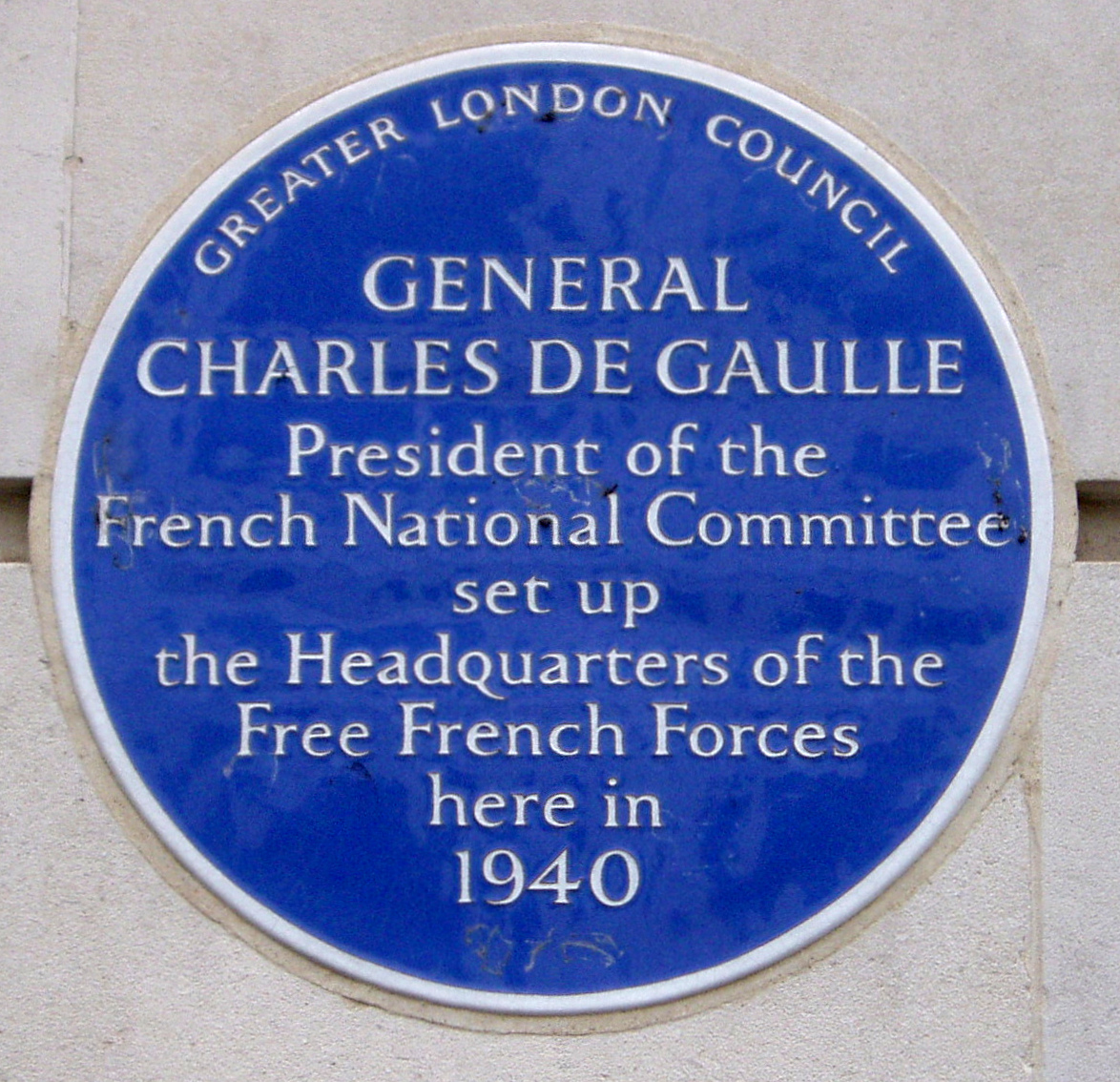
Blue plaque commemorating the headquarters of General de Gaulle at 4 Carlton Gardens in London during World War II

=== French ===
- Grand-Croix of the Légion d'honneur – 1945 (Officer – 1934; Knight – 1919)
- Grand Master of the Ordre de la Libération
- Grand-Croix of the Ordre national du Mérite – 1963
- Croix de guerre 1915
- Combatant's Cross
- Medal for the War Wounded
- 1914–1918 Inter-Allied Victory medal (France)
- 1914–1918 Commemorative war medal (France)
- 1939–1945 Commemorative war medal (France)

=== Foreign ===
- Silver Cross of Virtuti Militari of Poland (1920)
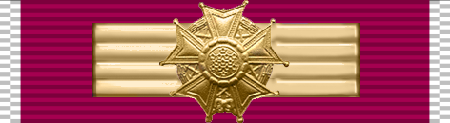
- Chief Commander of the US Legion of Merit (24 August 1945)
- Grand Cordon of the Order of the Dragon of Annam (last awarded 1945)
- Grand Cross with Collar of the Order of Merit of the Italian Republic (16 June 1959)
- Royal Victorian Chain (1960)
- Knight of the Order of the Royal House of Chakri of Thailand (11 October 1960)
- Knight of the Royal Order of the Seraphim (Sweden, 8 May 1963)
- Collar of the Order of Merit of Chile (October 1964)
- Knight of the Order of the Elephant (Denmark, 5 April 1965)
- Grand Cross with Collar of the Royal Norwegian Order of St. Olav (1962)
- Grand Cross with Collar of the Order of the White Rose of Finland (1962)
- Order of the Star of the Socialist Republic of Romania, 1st class (14 May 1968)
- Grand Cross of the Royal Order of Cambodia
- Grand Cross of the Order of the Million Elephants and the White Parasol of Laos
- Grand Cross Extraordinary of the Order of Boyaca of Colombia
- Grand Cordon of the Sharifian Order of Military Merit of Morocco
- Collar of the Order of the Liberator General San Martín of Argentina
- Grand Collar of the National Order of Merit of Ecuador
- Grand Cross of the Order of Military Merit of Brazil
- Grand Cross of the National Order of Merit of Paraguay
- Grand Cross of the Order of the Sun of Peru
- Grand Collar and Medal of the Order of the Southern Cross of Brazil
- Member 1st Class of the Order of Pahlavi of Iran
- Grand Cross of the Military Order of Ayacucho of Peru
- Collar of the Order of the Aztec Eagle of Mexico
- Member 1st Class of the Order of the Two Rivers of Iraq
- Collar of the Order of the Liberator of Venezuela
- Grand Collar of the National Order of the Condor of the Andes of Bolivia
- Member 1st Class of the Order of Umayyad of Syria
- Grand Cordon of the National Order of the Cedar of Lebanon
- Member of the Order of the Benevolent Ruler of Nepal
- Grand Cordon of the Order of Leopold of Belgium
- Grand Cross of the Order of Saint-Charles of Monaco (5 October 1944)
- Grand Cross of the Order of Merit of the Federal Republic of Germany
- Collar of the Order of Al-Hussein bin Ali (Jordan)
- Knight of the Supreme Order of Christ of the Vatican
- Knight with the Collar of the Order of Pius IX of the Vatican
- Grand Commander of the Order of the Redeemer of Greece
- Papal Lateran Cross of the Vatican
- Grand Cross of the Order of Polonia Restituta of Poland
- Commander of the Bavarian Order of Merit

=== Medals ===
- Medal of the Mexican Academy of Military Studies
- Medal of Rancagua of Chile
- Medal of the Legionnaires of Quebec
- Medal of the City of Valparaiso
- Medal of Honour of the Congress of Peru
- Plaque and Medal of the City of Lima, Peru
- Medal of the City of New Orleans
- Order of the American Legion
- Medal of the College Joseph Celestine Mutis of Spain

== Works ==
=== French editions ===
- La Discorde Chez l'Ennemi (1924)
- Histoire des Troupes du Levant (1931) Written by Major de Gaulle and Major Yvon, with Staff Colonel de Mierry collaborating in the preparation of the final text.
- Le Fil de l'Épée (1932, republished 2010, 2015)
- Vers l'Armée de Métier (1934)
- La France et son Armée (1938)
- Trois Études (1945) (Rôle Historique des Places Fortes; Mobilisation Economique à l'Étranger; Comment Faire une Armée de Métier) followed by the Memorandum of 26 January 1940.
- Mémoires de Guerre
  - Volume I – L'Appel 1940–1942 (1954)
  - Volume II – L'Unité, 1942–1944 (1956)
  - Volume III – Le Salut, 1944–1946 (1959)
- Mémoires d'Espoir
  - Volume I – Le Renouveau 1958–1962 (1970)
- Discours et Messages
  - Volume I – Pendant la Guerre 1940–1946 (1970)
  - Volume II – Dans l'attente 1946–1958 (1970)
  - Volume III – Avec le Renouveau 1958–1962 (1970)
  - Volume IV – Pour l'Effort 1962–1965 (1970)
  - Volume V – Vers le Terme 1966–1969

=== English translations ===
- The Enemy's House Divided (La Discorde chez l'ennemi). Tr. by Robert Eden. University of North Carolina Press, Chapel Hill, 2002.
- The Edge of the Sword (Le Fil de l'Épée). Tr. by Gerard Hopkins. Faber, London, 1960 Criterion Books, New York, 1960
- The Army of the Future (Vers l'Armée de Métier). Hutchinson, London-Melbourne, 1940. Lippincott, New York, 1940
- France and Her Army (La France et son Armée). Tr. by F. L. Dash. Hutchinson London, 1945. Ryerson Press, Toronto, 1945
- War Memoirs: Call to Honour, 1940–1942 (L'Appel). Tr. by Jonathan Griffin. Collins, London, 1955 (two volumes). Viking Press, New York, 1955.
- War Memoirs: Unity, 1942–1944 (L'Unité). Tr. by Richard Howard (narrative) and Joyce Murchie and Hamish Erskine (documents). Weidenfeld & Nicolson, London, 1959 (two volumes). Simon & Schuster, New York, 1959 (two volumes).
- War Memoirs: Salvation, 1944–1946 (Le Salut). Tr. by Richard Howard (narrative) and Joyce Murchie and Hamish Erskine (documents). Weidenfeld & Nicolson, London, 1960 (two volumes). Simon & Schuster, New York, 1960 (two volumes).
- Memoirs of Hope: Renewal, 1958–1962. Endeavour, 1962– (Le Renouveau) (L'Effort). Tr. by Terence Kilmartin. Weidenfeld & Nicolson, London, 1971.

== See also ==
- Foreign policy of Charles de Gaulle
- France's neocolonialism
- Gaullism
- Gaullist Party
- List of things named after Charles de Gaulle

== Notes ==
Military offices
| New office | Leader of Free France; 1940–1943 | Office abolished |
| New office | President of the French National Committee; 1941–1943 | Office abolished |
| New office | President of the French Committee of National Liberation; 1943–1944; Served alongside: Henri Giraud | Office abolished |
Political offices
| Preceded by Hippolyte Ducos | Under-Secretary of State for War and National Defence; 1940 | Office abolished |
| Preceded by Philippe Pétain as Chief of the French State | Chair of the Provisional Government of France; 1944–1946 | Succeeded by Félix Gouin |
| Preceded by Pierre Laval as Chief of the Government | Chair of the Provisional Government of France; 1944–1946 | Succeeded by Félix Gouin |
| Preceded by Pierre Pflimlin | Prime Minister of France; 1958–1959 | Succeeded by Michel Debré |
| Preceded by Pierre de Chevigné | Minister of Defence; 1958–1959 | Succeeded by Pierre Guillaumat |
| Preceded by André Mutter | Minister of Algerian Affairs; 1958–1959 | Succeeded by Louis Joxe |
| Preceded by René Coty | President of France; 1959–1969 | Succeeded by Georges Pompidou |
Regnal titles
| Preceded by Philippe Pétain; René Coty | Co-Prince of Andorra; 1944–1946; 1959–1969; Served alongside: Ramon Iglesias Navarri | Succeeded by Félix Gouin; Georges Pompidou |
