= Trocadéro Esplanade =

Esplanade in Paris named for human rights, located at the Palais de Chaillot

Coordinates: 45°11′30″N 5°41′18″E

Parvis des Droits de l’Homme
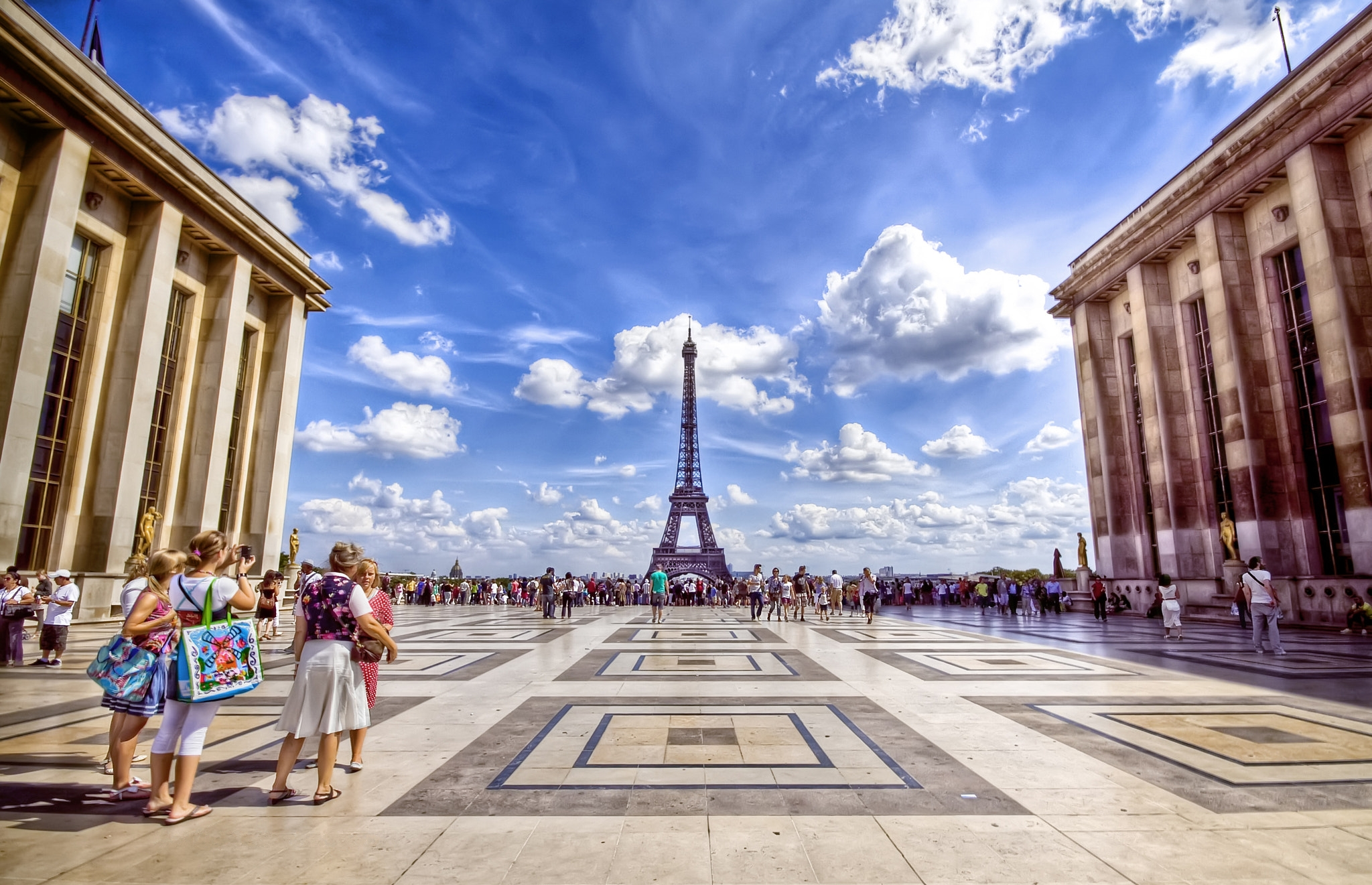
- The Parvis des Droits de l’Homme.
- Interactive map of Parvis des Droits de l’Homme
- Owner: City of Paris
- Location: 16th arrondissement, Paris, France
- Nearest metro station: Trocadéro

Construction
- Construction start: 19th century
- Inauguration: 1985

The Parvis des Droits de l’Homme or Trocadéro Esplanade is located in Paris, at Place du Trocadéro.

== Location ==
This esplanade separates the two wings of the Palais de Chaillot and faces the Place du Trocadéro (officially renamed Place du Trocadéro-et-du-11-Novembre in 1978) while overlooking the Jardins du Trocadéro. It serves as the rooftop terrace of the Théâtre national de la danse, located beneath it. The esplanade is occasionally used by rollerskaters and skateboarders, although it was not designed for such activities. Its prime view of the Eiffel Tower makes it a popular spot for tourists.

The site is served by the Trocadéro Paris Métro station.

== Origin of the Name ==
The name "Parvis des Droits de l’Homme" (Human Rights Esplanade) was designated in 1985 at the initiative of François Mitterrand, President of France.

== History ==
The esplanade was created in the mid-1930s alongside the Palais de Chaillot. It replaced the concert hall of the Trocadéro Palace. On either side, adjacent to the palace, are four gilded bronze statues (eight in total), representing allegories such as La Jeunesse by Alexandre Descatoire, Le Matin by Pryas, and Les Jardins by Robert Couturier, with seven depicting women and one a young boy. In 1964, the artist Christo wrapped the statue of Printemps by Paul Niclausse in transparent fabric.

In 1940, during his visit to Paris, Adolf Hitler crossed the esplanade, resulting in a well-known photograph.

The name “Parvis des Droits de l’Homme” commemorates the adoption of the Universal Declaration of Human Rights on 10 December 1948 by the United Nations General Assembly, which held its 5th session at the Palais de Chaillot beneath the esplanade. One of its principal drafters was René Cassin. A plaque installed in 1985 at the entrance to the esplanade declares that “all human beings are born free and equal in dignity and rights” (Article 1 of the Declaration of the Rights of Man and of the Citizen of 1789).

On 17 October 1987, at the initiative of Father Joseph Wresinski, a second plaque was installed at the opposite end of the esplanade. It reads:

On 17 October 1987, defenders of human and citizen rights from all countries gathered on this esplanade. They paid tribute to the victims of hunger, ignorance, and violence. They affirmed their conviction that poverty is not inevitable. They proclaimed their solidarity with those struggling worldwide to eradicate it. Wherever people are condemned to live in poverty, human rights are violated. Uniting to uphold them is a sacred duty.

The unveiling of this plaque led to the establishment of the International Day for the Eradication of Poverty, observed annually on 17 October and officially recognized by the United Nations General Assembly as the International Day for the Eradication of Poverty.

In 2016, President François Hollande inaugurated a plaque honoring disabled individuals who died during the Occupation.

The esplanade frequently hosts political gatherings related to French or international politics.

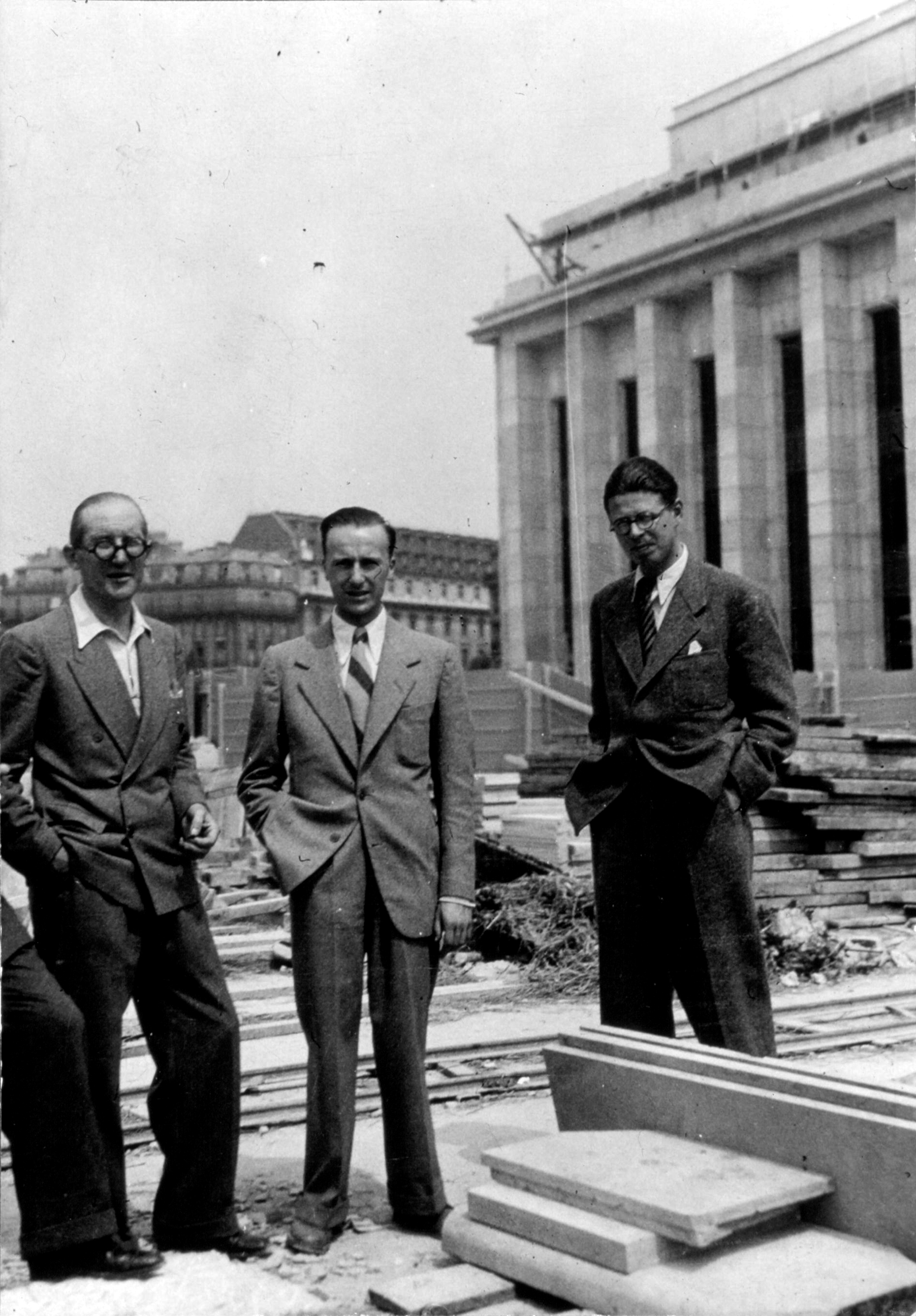
Le Corbusier in front of the Palais de Chaillot during the World Expo in 1937.

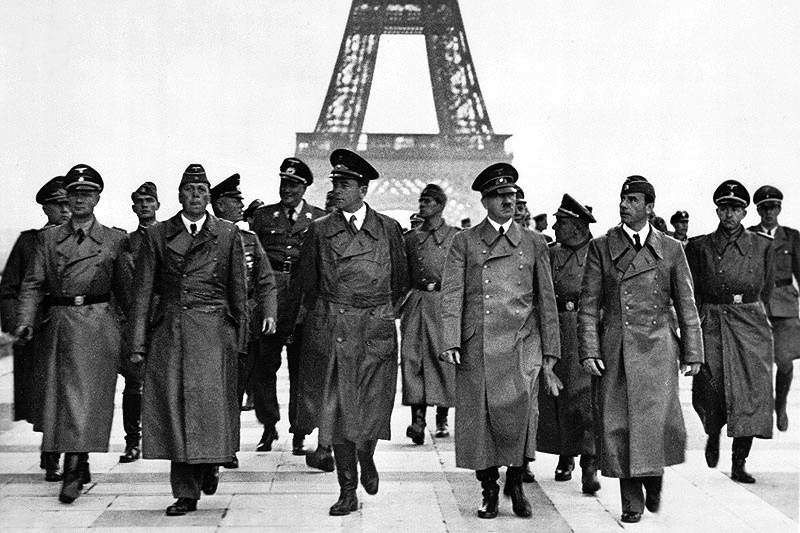
Adolf Hitler in 1940.

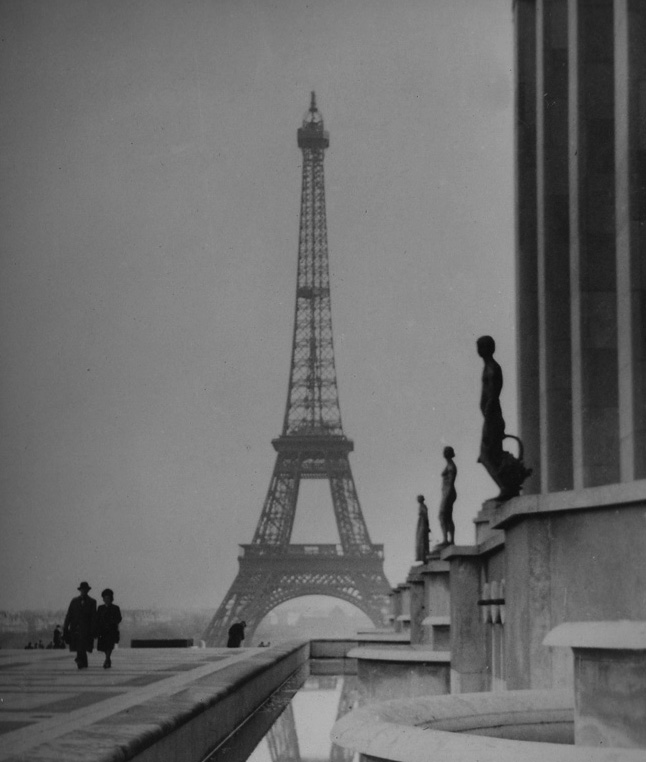
The esplanade in 1945.

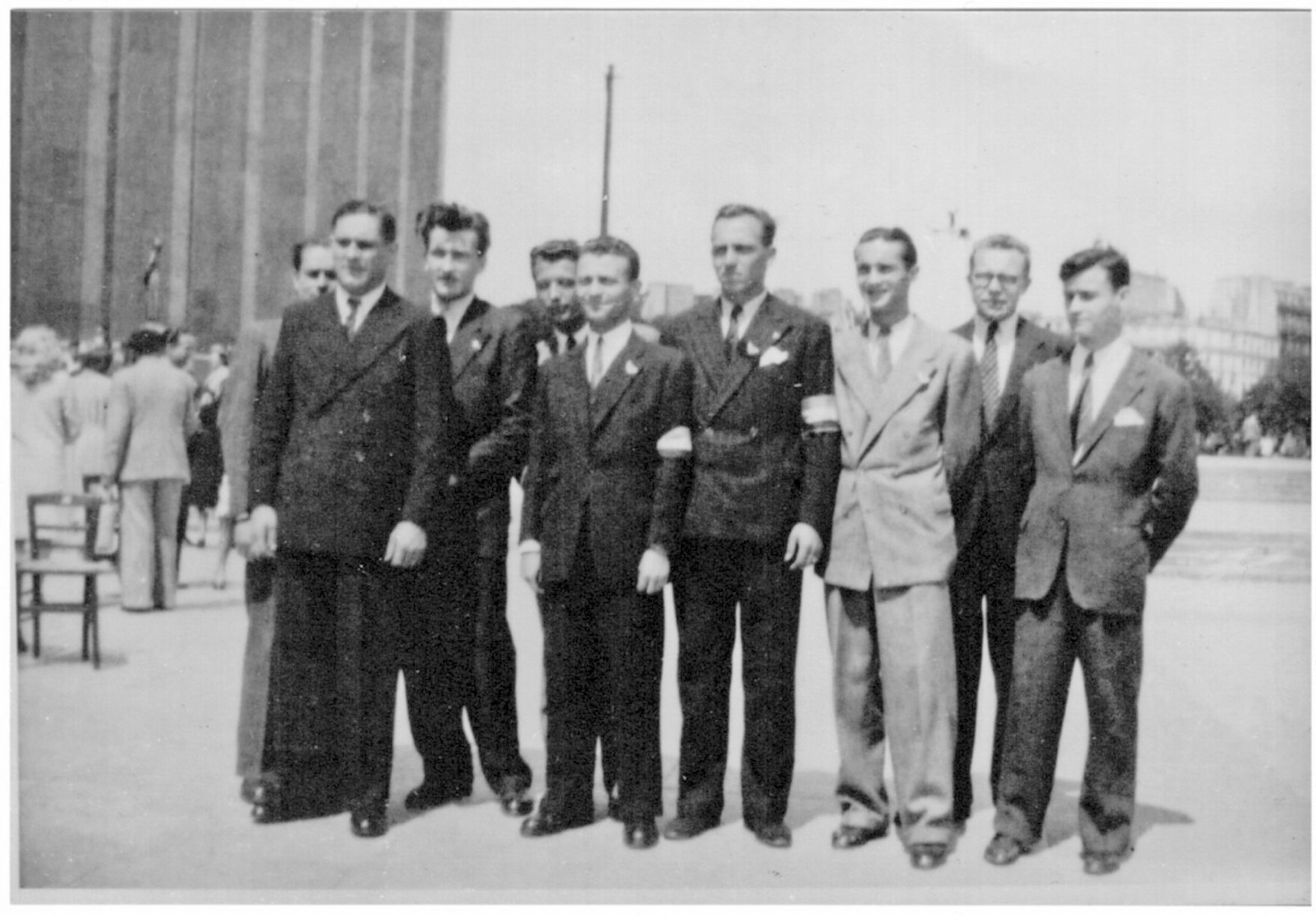
Members of 16th Arrondissement Motorized Section in 1946.

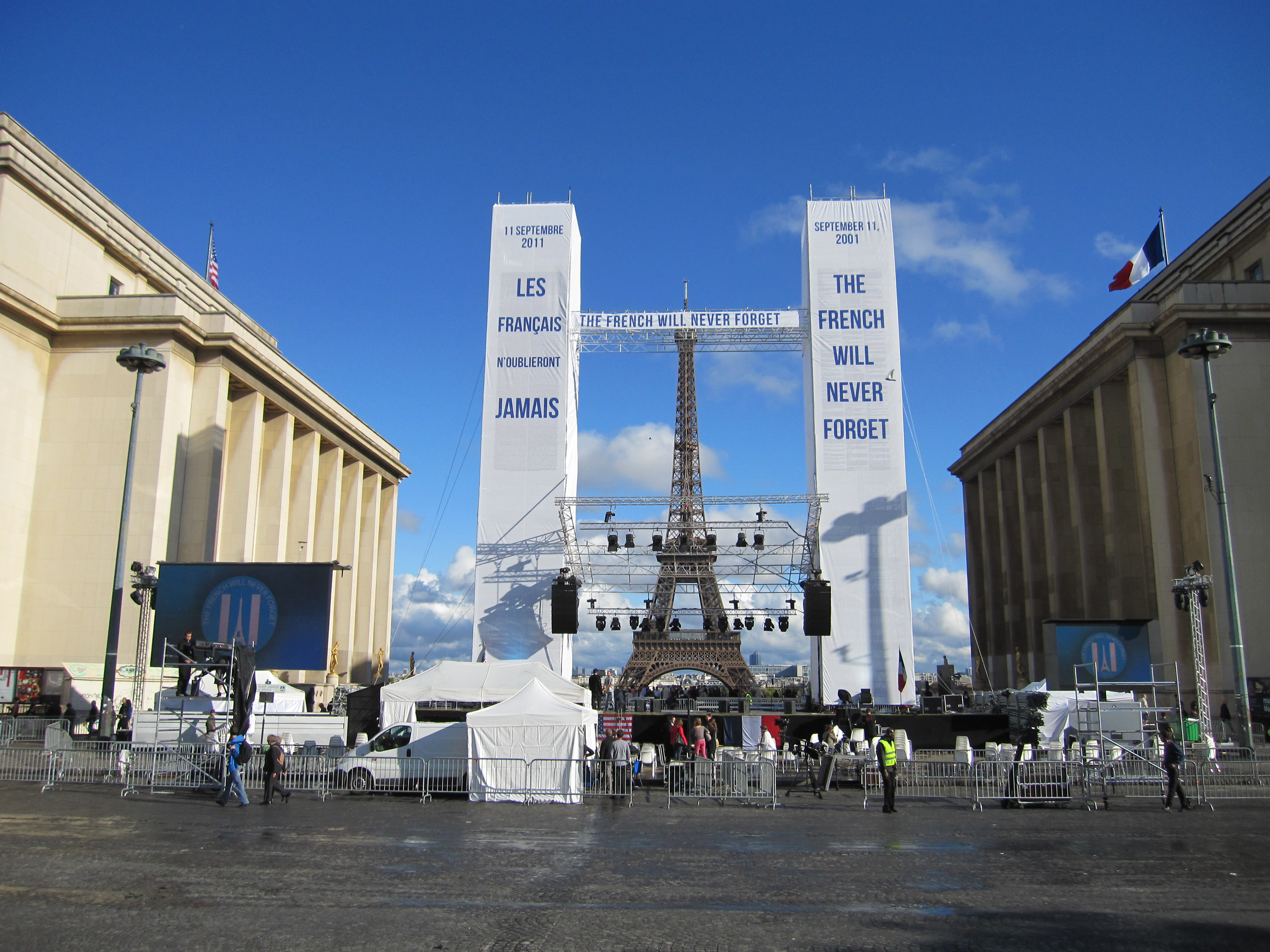
Commemoration of the tenth anniversary of the September 11 attacks.

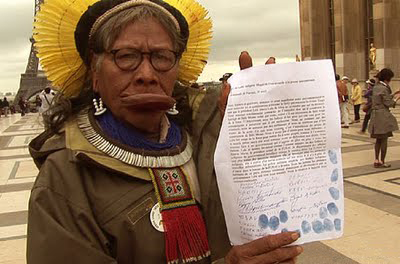
Chief Raoni with the first signatures of his international petition against the Belo Monte Dam, in 2011.

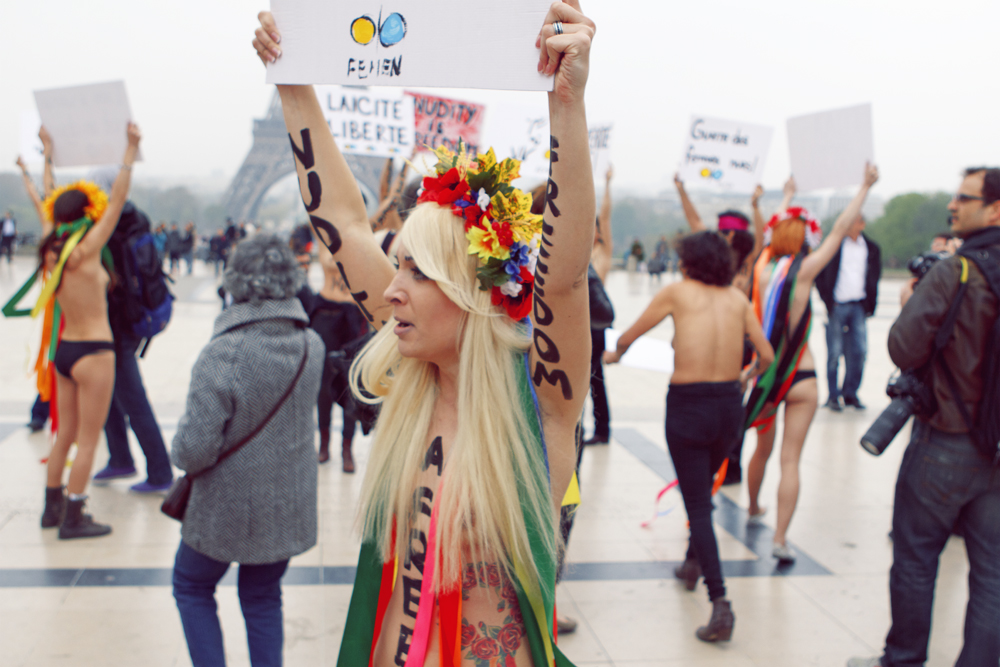
Femen demonstration in 2012.

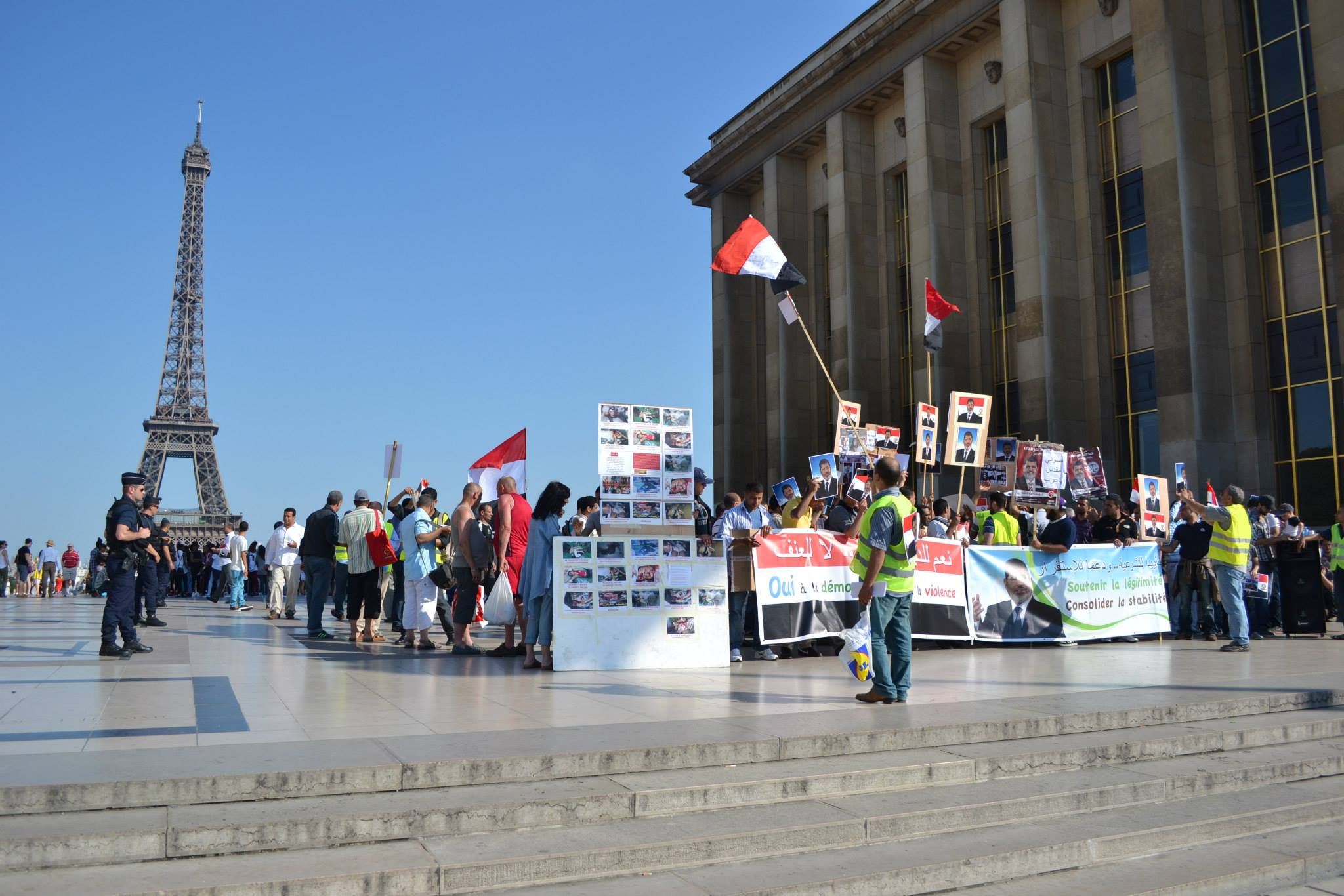
Demonstration in support of Egyptian President Mohamed Morsi, in 2013.

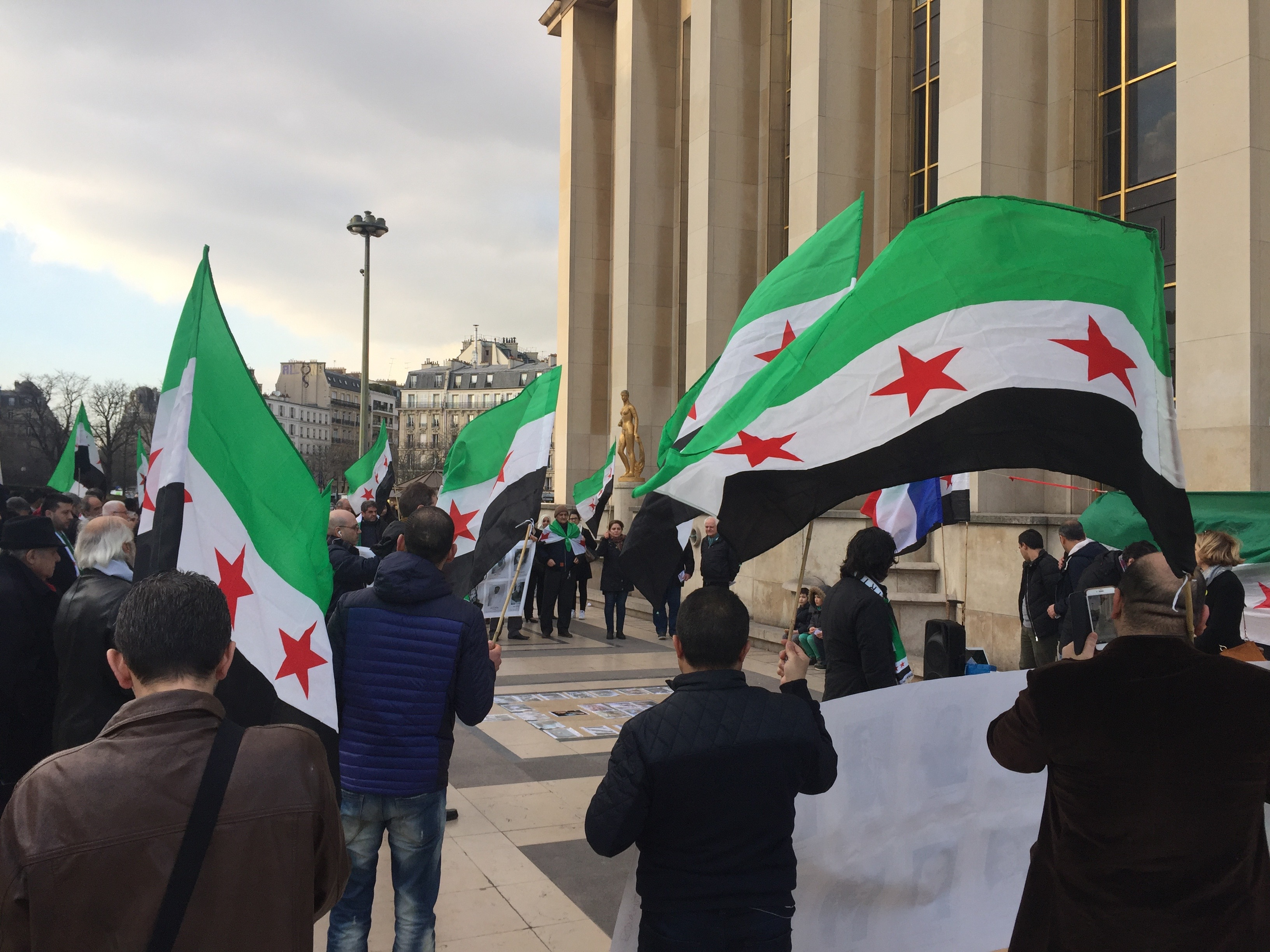
Demonstration in support of the Syrian revolution, in 2017.

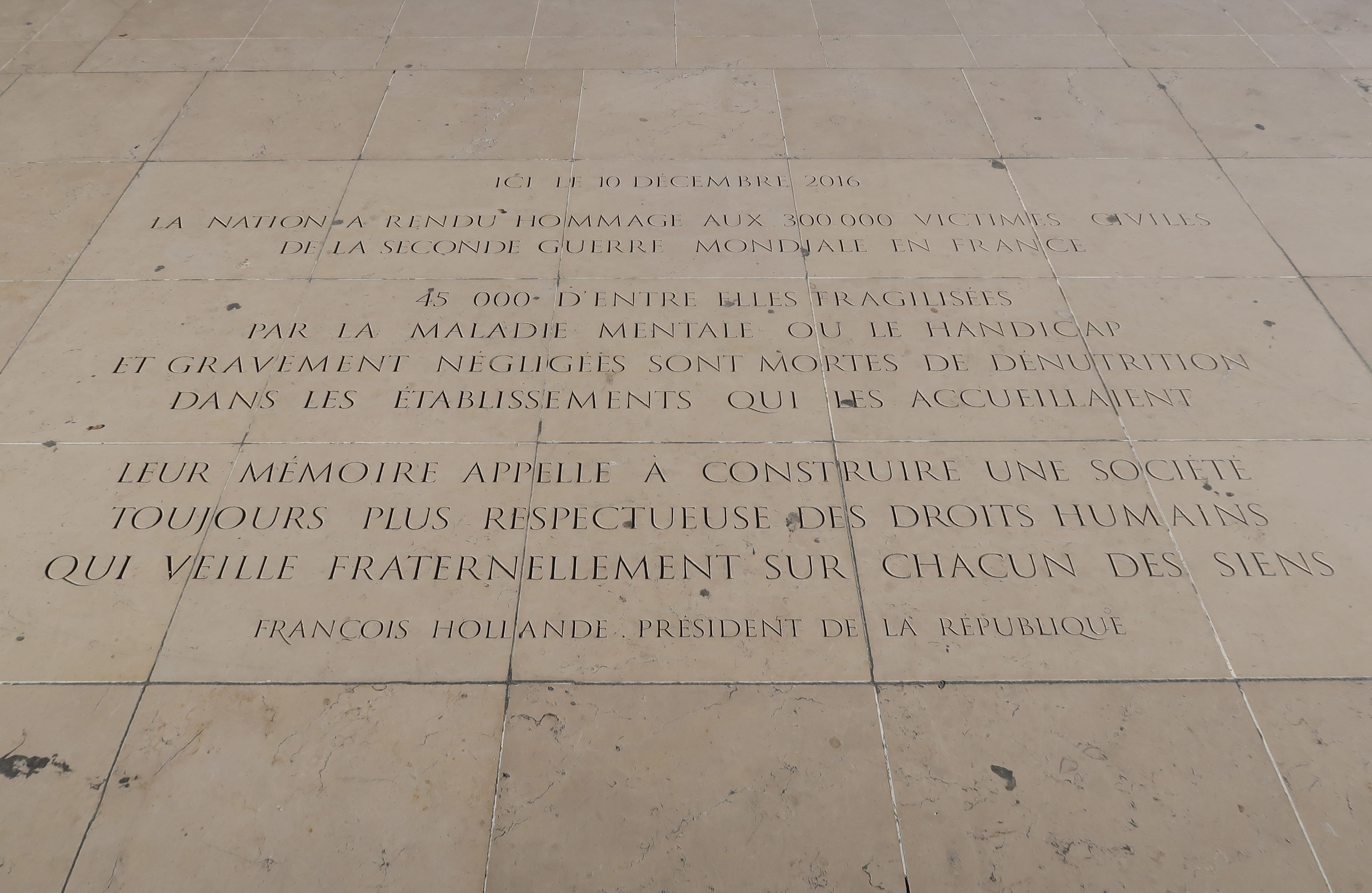
Plaque installed in 2016.

== In popular culture ==
- In the film Les Yeux sans visage (released in 1960) by Georges Franju, a young girl walks on this esplanade before meeting Edna Grüberg in a café at the Place du Trocadéro.
- In the film L'Homme de Rio (released in 1964) by Philippe de Broca, a scene is filmed on the esplanade.
- In the film Les Chinois à Paris (released in 1974) by Jean Yanne, a somber celebration takes place on this esplanade, failing to “unleash the forces of joy” in a France occupied by the Chinese People’s Liberation Army.
- In the film Le Professionnel (released in 1981) by Georges Lautner, characters drive across the esplanade.
- In the film Les Misérables (released in 2019) by Ladj Ly, Issa and his friends visit the esplanade before a football final.
- In the film John Wick Chapter 4 (released in 2023) by Chad Stahelski, John meets with the Marquis De Gramont to discuss the terms of their duel here.

== Bibliography ==
- La Restauration du parvis des Libertés-et-des-droits-de-l'Homme au palais de Chaillot [The Restoration of the Parvis des Libertés-et-des-droits-de-l’Homme at the Palais de Chaillot] (in French). Service national des travaux, D. Carré. 2004. p. 31.
- Ory, Pascal (2006). Le palais de Chaillot [The Palais de Chaillot]. Les grands témoins de l'architecture (in French). Cité de l’architecture et du patrimoine / Aristéas / Actes Sud.
