= Tillion =

Tillion is a surname. Notable people with the surname include:

- Clem Tillion (1925–2021), American politician for Alaska
- Émilie Tillion (1876–1945), French writer and art critic, and a French Resistance member, murdered in Ravensbrück concentration camp
- Germaine Tillion (1907–2008), French ethnologist, and a French Resistance member; daughter of Émilie

== See also ==
- Lycée Germaine Tillion (Le Bourget), a public secondary school in the northeastern suburbs of Paris, France
- Tillon, people with this name
