= Geneviève de Gaulle-Anthonioz =

French Resistance member, charity organiser (1920–2002)

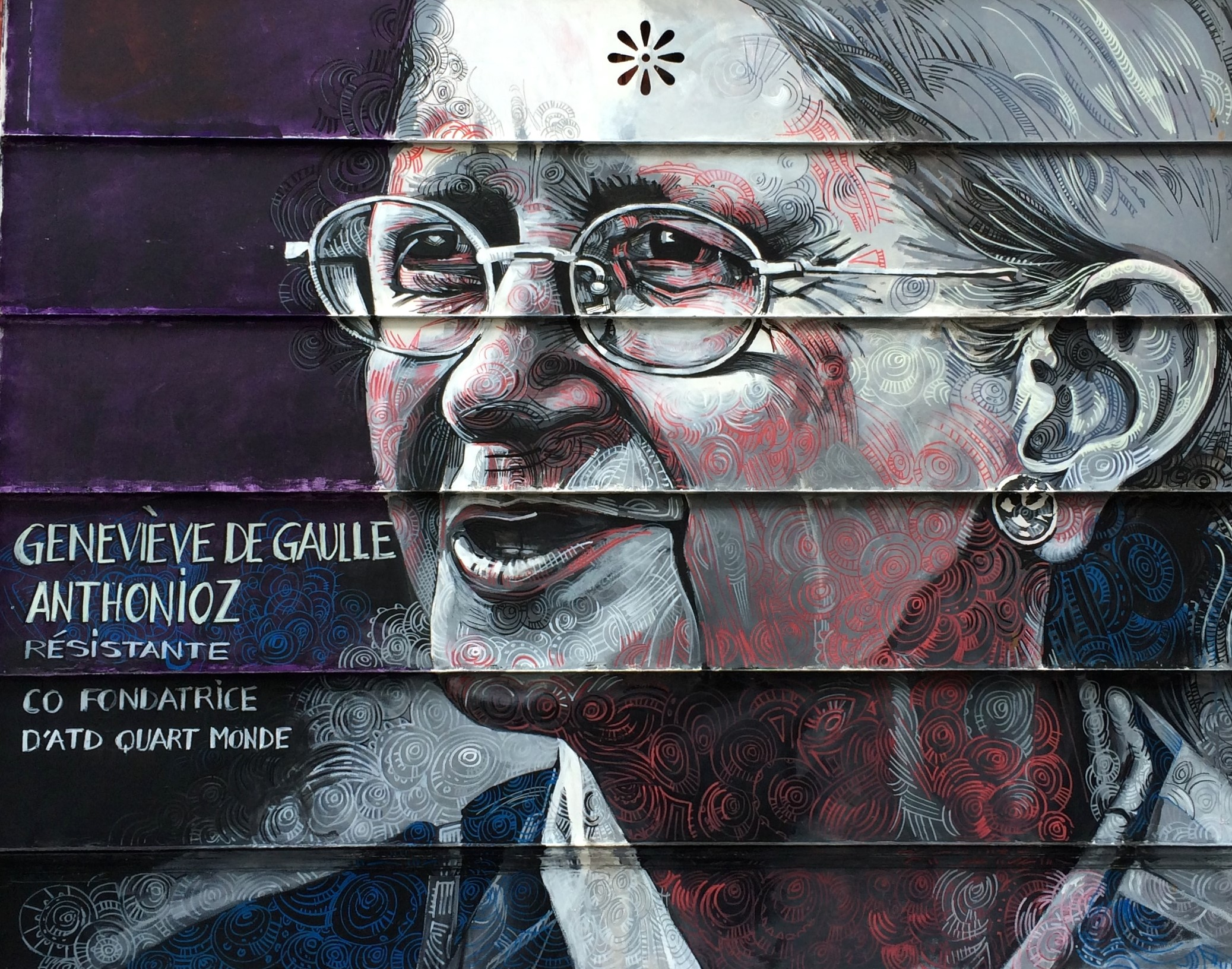
- Work by Ernesto Novo at the Rue de Tourtille and Rue Ramponeau, Paris, 2014
- Born: 25 October 1920; Saint-Jean-de-Valériscle, France
- Died: 14 February 2002 (aged 81); Paris, France
- Resting place: Panthéon, Paris
- Education: University of Paris; University of Rennes
- Occupations: President, ATD Quart Monde (1964–1998)
- Relatives: Charles de Gaulle (uncle)
- Honours: Grand Cross of the Legion of Honour

Geneviève de Gaulle-Anthonioz (25 October 1920 – 14 February 2002) was a member of the French Resistance in World War II, during which she was sent to Ravensbrück concentration camp. After the war, she was a human rights defender and president of the charity organisation ATD Quart Monde for poverty reduction. Her uncle was General Charles de Gaulle, who served as President of France from 1959 to 1969.

== French Resistance ==
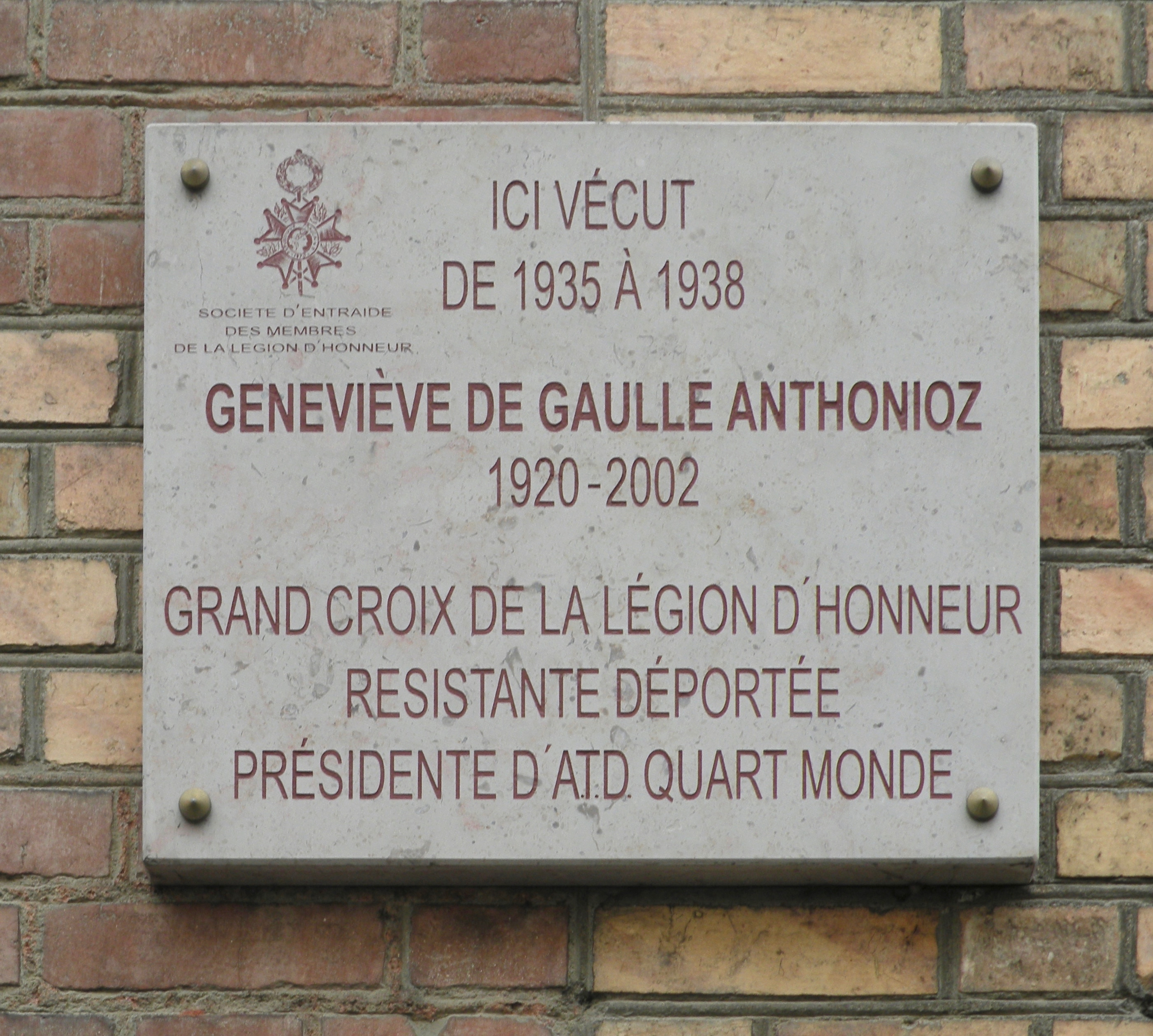
Commemorative plaque at the home of Geneviève de Gaulle, 10 Rue de Robin, Rennes

Geneviève de Gaulle joined the Resistance after the occupation of France in June 1940 and expanded its publicity networks, in particular that of Défense de la France. She was arrested by Pierre Bonny of the French Gestapo on 20 July 1943, imprisoned in Fresnes and deported to Ravensbrück concentration camp on 2 February 1944. Her fellow-prisoners included Jacqueline Fleury and Germaine Tillion.

In October 1944, de Gaulle was placed in isolation in the camp bunker. Heinrich Himmler made the decision to keep her alive to use her as a possible exchange prisoner. She was released in April 1945 after the camp's liberation. In 1946 she married Bernard Anthonioz, a fellow resistance member and art editor, with whom she had four children.

Fifty years after her release from Ravensbrück Geneviève de Gaulle-Anthonioz wrote the book La Traversée de la nuit (literally, The Crossing of the Night) about her life in the concentration camp and the mutual help among the women. It was translated into English and published by Arcade Publishing as The Dawn of Hope: A Memoir of Ravensbrück ISBN 1-55970-498-5, and re-published by Points in 1998 as God Remained Outside - An Echo of Ravensbruck.

== Career ==
As an active member and later president of the ADIR (Association of Deportées and Internées of the Résistance), she filed lawsuits against Nazi war criminals, then took part in the rise of the political movement launched by her uncle, Rassemblement du peuple français (Rally of the French People).

In 1958, de Gaulle-Anthonioz worked with the cabinet of André Malraux of which her husband was a member. She met Father Joseph Wresinski, then chaplain of the town of Noisy-le-Grand. The suffering of the families she met there revived those which she and other deportees had experienced.

Starting as a permanent volunteer, de Gaulle-Anthonioz served as president of the movement ATD Quart Monde from 1964 to 1998.

In 1987, she testified in the case of Klaus Barbie.

In 1988 she became a member of the French Economic and Social Council, and for ten years fought for the adoption of a law against poverty. Deferred in 1997 due to the dissolution of the French National Assembly, her law was enacted in 1998.

== Legacy ==
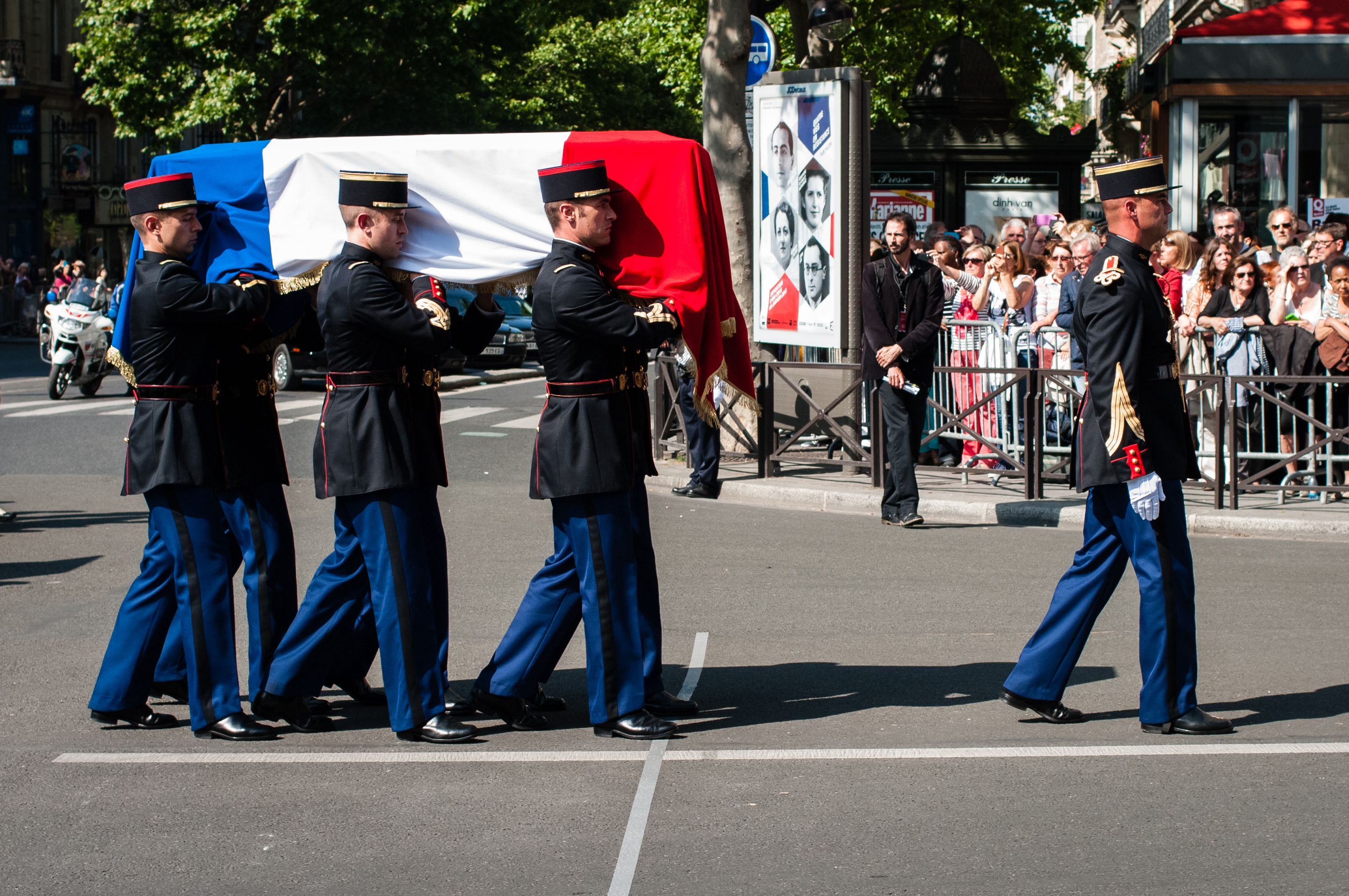
Interment at the Panthéon

On 21 February 2014, French President François Hollande announced that Mme. de Gaulle-Anthonioz would be interred in the Panthéon.

She was interred there in May 2015 in a symbolic funeral. The coffin of Geneviève de Gaulle-Anthonioz at the Panthéon does not contain her remains but soil from her gravesite, because her family did not want her remains to be parted from those of her husband.

== Works ==
- La traversée de la nuit, Editions du Seuil, Paris, 1998
- God Remained Outside - An Echo of Ravensbruck (Translation), 1999, ISBN 0-285-63530-1
- Le secret de l'espérance, Fayard/Editions Quart Monde, Paris, 2001

== Decorations ==
- Médaille de la Résistance
- Croix de guerre 1939-1945
- Grand-Croix de la Légion d'honneur (de Gaulle-Anthonioz was the first woman to be awarded this rank).

== Other ==
- General Charles de Gaulle dedicated his Mémoires de guerre to her.

== See also ==
- de Gaulle family

== Bibliography ==
- Benoit Cazenave, Geneviève de Gaulle, in Hier war das Ganze Europa, Stiftung Brandenburgische Gedenkstätte, Editions Metropol Verlag, Berlin 2004.
