= Tillen =

Tillen is a surname. Notable people with the surname include:

- Joe Tillen (born 1986), English footballer
- Sam Tillen (born 1985), English footballer

== See also ==
- Tillon, another surname
