= De Gaulle family =

List of members of the family of Charles de Gaulle

The de Gaulle family produced several 20th-century officers, Resistance members, and French politicians.

There is a widespread notion claiming that the particle in "de Gaulle" is derived from a dialectal form of the article (it should logically be written De Gaulle, for one writes Le Châtelier, but usage has always favoured the lowercase form). However, the genealogy of this ancient bourgeois family, established by the general's grandfather, Julien Philippe de Gaulle, alumnus of the École Nationale des Chartes, shows that his ancestors, capitaines-châtelains of Cuisery, Saône-et-Loire in the 17th century, have always written their name in this way.

Note: This family tree is not intended to be exhaustive, but rather aims to show the principal public figures of Charles de Gaulle's family.

== Descent from Julien de Gaulle ==
1. Julien de Gaulle (1801–1883), historian
  x 1835 to Joséphine Maillot, writer.
  1. Charles de Gaulle (1837–1880), specialist in Celtic languages and civilisation
  2. Henri de Gaulle (1848–1932), private school teacher.
    x 1886 to Jeanne Maillot.
    1. Xavier de Gaulle (1887–1955), soldier, Resistance member, twice married, five children.
      1. Geneviève de Gaulle-Anthonioz (1920–2002), president of the ATD Fourth World.
        1. Michel Anthonioz (1947–2009), writer and television director, diplomat.
    2. Marie-Agnès de Gaulle (1889–1982).
    3. Charles de Gaulle (1890–1970), general, President of France.
      x 1921 to Yvonne Vendroux (1900–1979).
      1. Philippe de Gaulle (1921–2024), admiral, senator.
        x 1947 to Henriette de Montalembert (1929–2014), four sons.
        1. Charles de Gaulle (1948– ), lawyer, elected official who switched from the UDF to the National Front.
        2. Yves de Gaulle (1951– ).
        3. Jean de Gaulle (1953– ), deputy from 1986 to 2007.
        4. Pierre de Gaulle (1963– ).
      2. Élisabeth de Gaulle (1924–2013).
        x 1946 to Major Alain de Boissieu (1914–2006).
        1. Anne de Boissieu (1959– ).
      3. Anne de Gaulle (1928–1948), born with Down syndrome, no issue.
    4. Jacques de Gaulle (1893–1946), disabled in 1926.
    5. Pierre de Gaulle (1897–1959), Resistance member, president of the Paris municipal council (1947–1951).
  3. Jules de Gaulle (1850–1922)

== Bibliography ==
- Biographies on the site of the Fondation Charles de Gaulle(in French)
