= Jacqueline Fleury =

French Resistance member (born 1923)

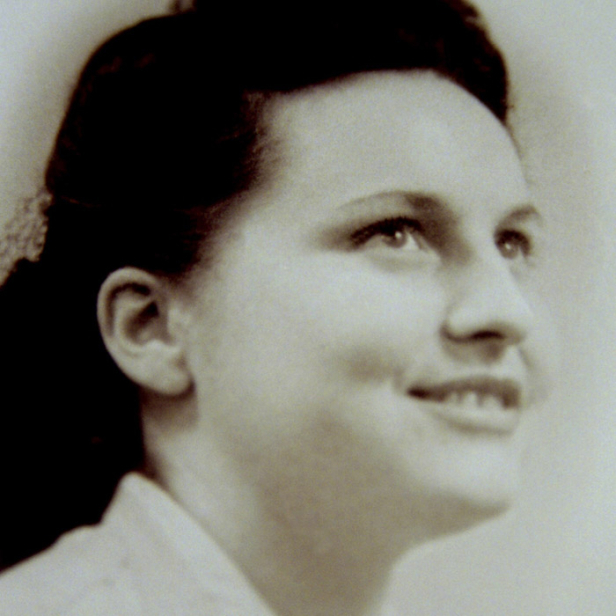
- Born: Jacqueline Marié; December 12, 1923 (age 102)
- Occupation: Member of the French Resistance

Jacqueline Marié-Fleury (born 12 December 1923) is a former member of the French Resistance.

== Life ==
Jacqueline Marié was born on 12 December 1923, as the daughter of a military engineer, Désiré Marié, who was working at Versailles when the Second World War broke out in 1939. She and her mother lost their home when the Germans invaded France in 1940, and she joined the Resistance, together with both her parents and her brother Pierre.

Jacqueline joined the team responsible for the publication of Défense de la France, and was responsible for distributing the underground magazine in the Versailles area, including the Renault works. She was also part of the "Réseau Mithridate" run by Pierre-Jean Herbinger to pass information to MI6.

Along with her parents, Jacqueline was arrested on 3 February 1944, and was held prisoner at Fresnes. She and her mother were both interned at Ravensbrück concentration camp, along with Geneviève de Gaulle-Anthonioz and Germaine Tillion. In April 1945, while on a forced "march of death" towards Czechoslovakia, she and her mother escaped; they were liberated by the Soviet army and reached France on 30 May. In 1946, she got married, becoming Madame Fleury, and subsequently had five children.

After the war, she joined the Association nationale des anciennes déportées et internées de la Résistance, and in 2002, she became president following the death of Geneviève de Gaulle-Anthonioz, when the organisation merged with the Société des familles et amis des anciennes déportées et internées de la Résistance. She was the 31st woman to be awarded the title of Grand Officier de la Légion d’Honneur.
