= Émilie Tillion =

French writer and art critic

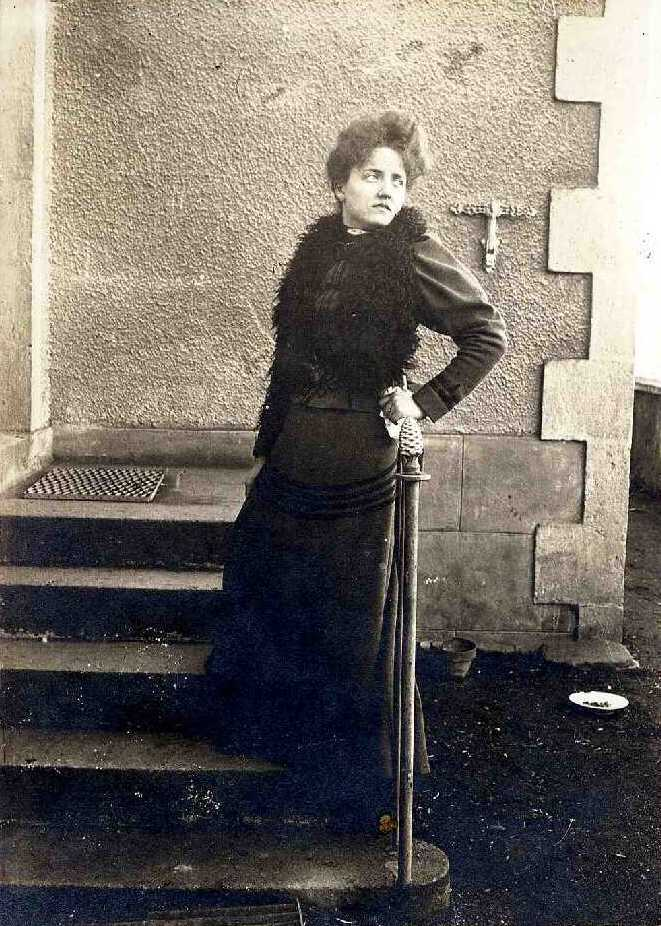
- Born: 20 February 1876; Talizat, France
- Died: 2 March 1945 (aged 69); Ravensbrück, Nazi Germany
- Occupation(s): Author, art critic
- Children: 2, including Germaine Tillion

Émilie Tillion (née Cussac; 20 February 1876 – 2 March 1945) was a French writer and art critic. Tillion is known for her work on the popular "Les Guides Bleus" and as a member of French Resistance during the Second World War.

Tillion was the mother of Germaine Tillion, who was also a Resistance fighter and a noted ethnologist.

== Biography ==
Tillion was born Émilie Cussac on 20 February 1876 in Talizat commune to a wealthy family of landowners in Cantal. Her father, Francois Cussac, was a notary of Puy-de-Dôme, and her mother was Antoinette Vivier. The Cussac family had produced a line of hereditary mayors of their town prior to the French Revolution.

In 1900, she married Lucien Tillion, a magistrate and a native of Charolais. Tillion, together with her husband, was the author of several tourist guidebooks in the Guides Bleus series, which is considered the oldest such publications in France. She was also a co-author of the Pays d'Europe volume.

Lucien Tillion died in 1925, leaving his wife to raise their two daughters, Germaine and Françoise, alone. In Paris, Émilie would be known as Madame Tillion. She gave lectures on art and was considered part of the milieu culturel, a group composed of intellectuals and ambassadors' wives.

== French Resistance ==
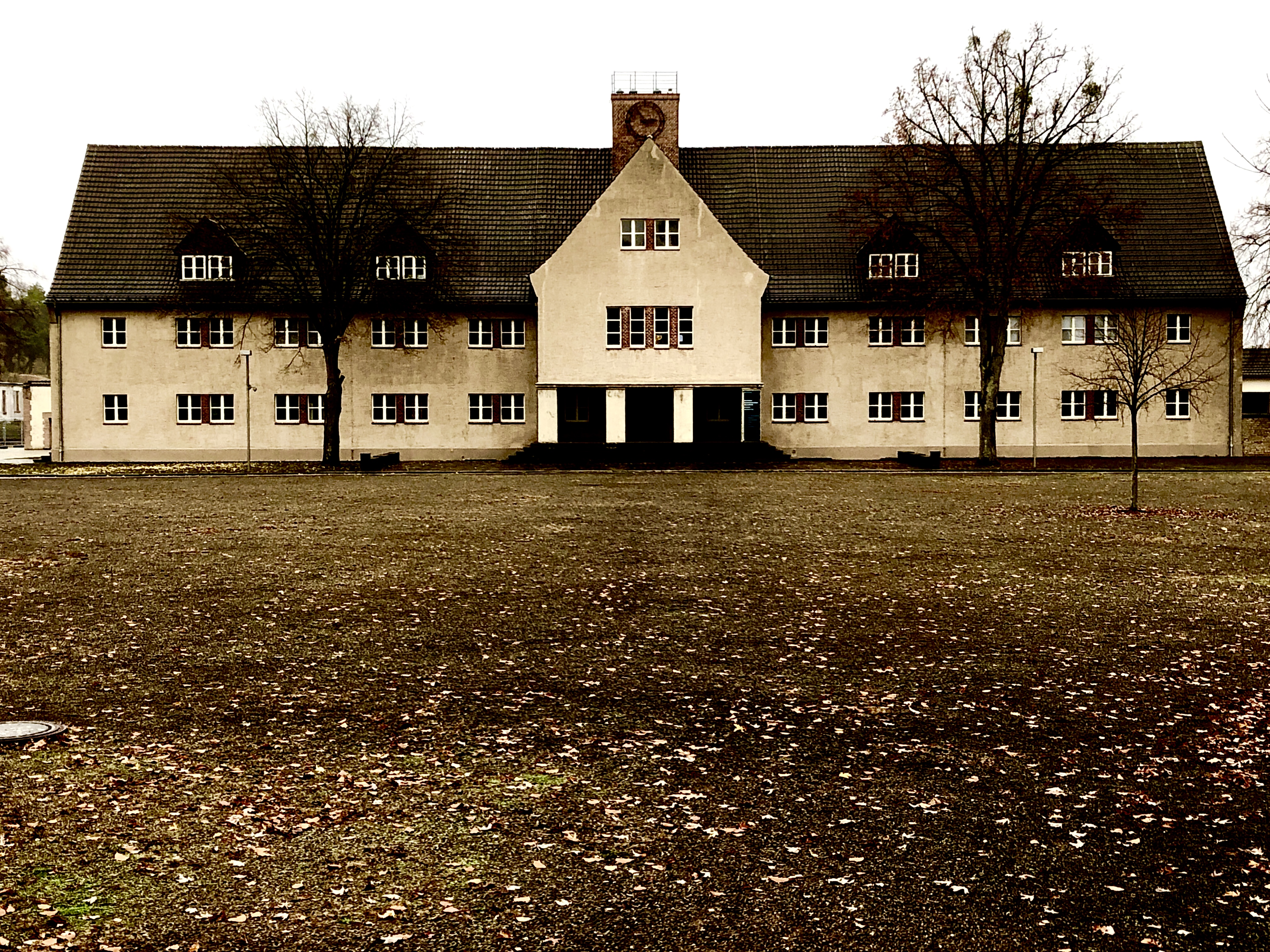
The main building of Ravensbrück concentration camp

Tillion's daughter Germaine spent six years in Algeria, studying desert tribes. Mother and daughter reunited when the latter returned to France on 9 June 1940, a few days before the German army occupied Paris. Both planned to escape to southern France until they found it pointless after hearing Philippe Pétain’s capitulation to the Nazis. By October of the same year, Tillion was an active member of the French Resistance serving as a liaison between the writers and artists who were part of the movement.

Tillion became one of the victims of the French collaborator, Father Robert Alesch. He reported her to the Abwehr for her participation in the attempted escape of Jean and Pierre de Vomécourt. Both were SOE agents incarcerated at the Fresnes Prison. She was deported to Ravensbrück four months after her daughter was arrested.

Tillion and 958 other women were transported in cattle wagons. An account by Geneviève de Gaulle-Anthonioz, a fellow prisoner, described her as around 70 years old during this ordeal but was looking forward to seeing her daughter. Upon meeting her at the camp, Tillion told Germaine, "Voyage exultant. Cologne, Düsseldorf, Elberfeld en ruines. La fin de la guerre est proche." (Great voyage. Cologne, Düsseldorf, Elberfeld in ruins. The end of the war is close.)

At Ravensbrück, prisoners who were 69 years old and above were targets of extermination. Through her contacts at the camp, Germaine managed to have her mother's age recorded as less than 60. Émilie Tillion, however, was killed on 2 March 1945. She was sentenced to death by gas chamber after she was selected from a targeted block because of her white hair. It is said that her mother's murder inspired Germaine to write the three-act operetta, Le Verfügbar aux Enfers.
