= Extreme poverty =

Condition characterized by severe deprivation of basic human needs

Above or below extreme poverty line world bank Population not in extreme poverty Population living in extreme poverty

Total population living in extreme poverty, by world region. Latin America and Caribbean East Asia and Pacific Islands South Asia Middle East and North Africa Europe and Central Asia Sub-Saharan Africa Other high income countries

Distribution of population poverty thresholds

Extreme poverty (Note: Also known as deep poverty, abject poverty, absolute poverty, destitution, or penury.) is the most severe type of poverty, defined by the United Nations (UN) as "a condition characterized by severe deprivation of basic human needs, including food, safe drinking water, sanitation facilities, health, shelter, education and information. It depends not only on income but also on access to services". Historically, other definitions have been proposed within the United Nations.

Extreme poverty mainly refers to an income below the international poverty line of $3 per day in 2025 ($2.99 in 2025 dollars), set by the World Bank. This is the equivalent of $1.00 a day in 1985 US prices, hence the widely used expression "living on less than a dollar a day". The vast majority of those in extreme poverty reside in Sub-Saharan Africa. As of 2026, it is estimated that the country with the most people living in extreme poverty is the Democratic Republic of the Congo, at 76.2 million.

In the past, the vast majority of the world population lived in conditions of extreme poverty. The percentage of the global population living in absolute poverty fell from over 80% in 1800 to around 10% by 2025. According to UN estimates, in 2025 roughly 831 million people or 10% remained under those conditions. In 2000, there had been 2.23 billion people in extreme poverty. Despite the significant number of individuals still below the international poverty line, these figures represent significant progress for the international community, as they reflect a decrease of more than one billion people over 25 years.

The reduction of extreme poverty and hunger was the first Millennium Development Goal (MDG1), as set by the United Nations in 2000. Specifically, the target was to reduce the extreme poverty rate by half by 2015, a goal that was met five years ahead of schedule. In the Sustainable Development Goal 1, which succeeded the MDGs, the goal is to end extreme poverty in all its forms everywhere. With this declaration the international community, including the UN and the World Bank have adopted the target of ending extreme poverty by 2030.

== Definition ==
=== Previous definitions ===
In July 1993, Leandro Despouy, the then UN Special Raporters on extreme poverty and human rights made use of a definition he adapted from a 1987 report to the French Economic and Social Council by Fr. Joseph Wresinski, founder of the International Movement ATD Fourth World, distinguishing "lack of basic security" (poverty) and "chronic poverty" (extreme poverty), linking the eradication of extreme poverty by allowing people currently experiencing it a real opportunity to exercise all their human rights:

The lack of basic security connotes the absence of one or more factors enabling individuals and families to assume basic responsibilities and to enjoy fundamental rights. The situation may become widespread and result in more serious and permanent consequences. The lack of basic security leads to chronic poverty when it simultaneously affects several aspects of people's lives, when it is prolonged and when it severely compromises people's chances of regaining their rights and of reassuming their responsibilities in the foreseeable future.

This definition was mentioned previously, in June 1989, in the preliminary report on the realization of economic, social and cultural rights by the UN Special Rapporteur Danilo Türk. It is still in use today, among others, in the current UN Guiding Principles on Extreme Poverty and Human Rights adopted by the UN Human Rights Council in September 2012.

=== Consumption-based definition ===
Share of population living in extreme poverty

Extreme poverty is defined by the international community as living below $3.00 a day, as measured in 2021 international prices (equivalent to $3.69 in 2026). This number, also known as the international poverty line, is periodically updated to account for inflation and differences in the cost of living; it was originally defined at $1.00 a day in 1996. The updates are made according to new price data to portray the costs of basic food, health services, clothing, and shelter around the world as accurately as possible. The latest revision was made in 2025 when the World Bank increased the line to international-$3.00.

Because many of the world's poorest people do not have a monetary income, the poverty measurement is based on the monetary value of a person's consumption. Otherwise the poverty measurement would be missing the home production of subsistence farmers that consume largely their own production.

=== Alternative definitions ===
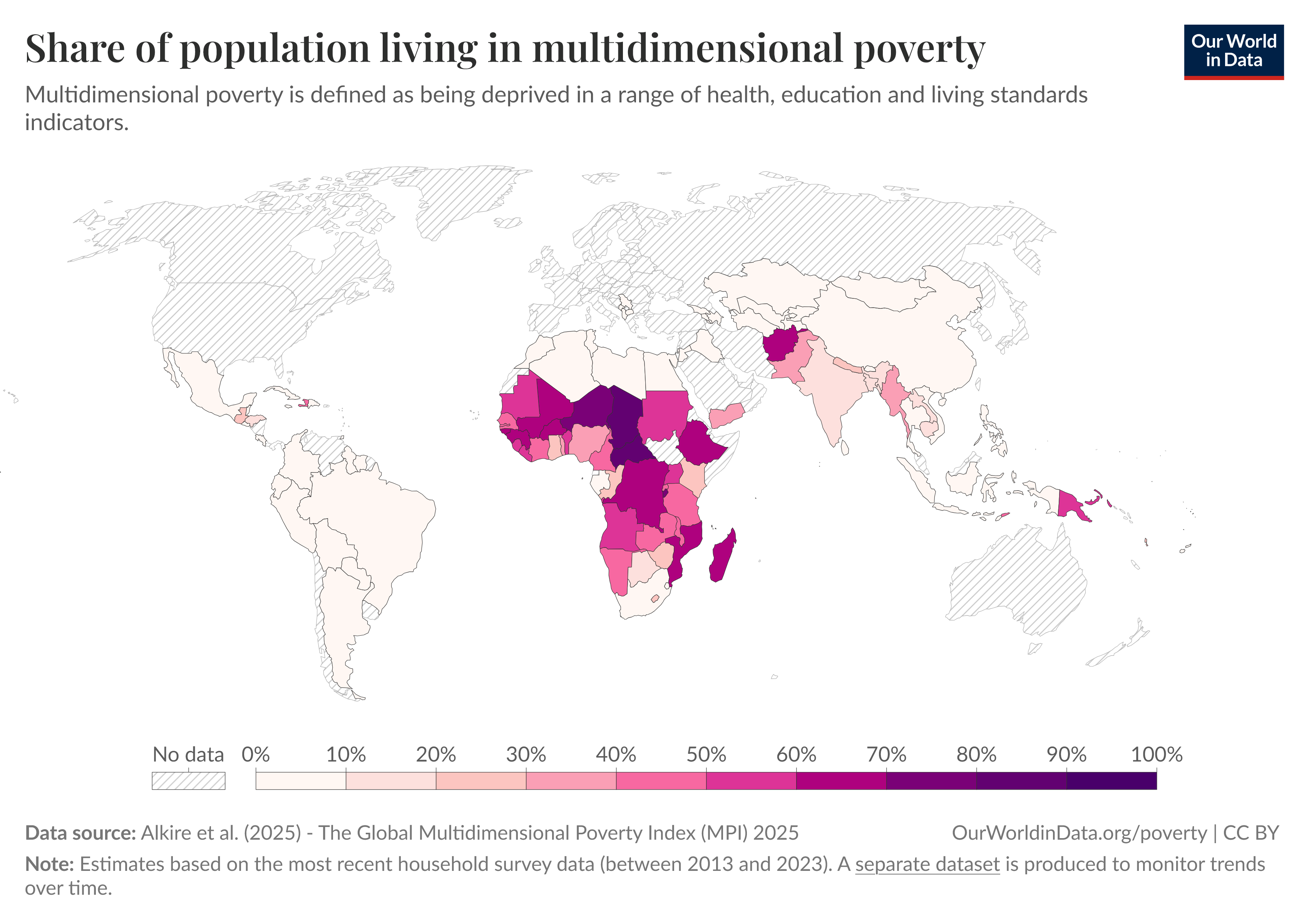
Graph of the share of population living in multidimensional poverty, 2025

The $3/day extreme poverty line remains the most widely used metric as it highlights the reality of those in the most severe conditions. Although widely used by most international organizations, it has come under scrutiny due to a variety of factors. For example, it does not account for how far below the line people are, referred to as the depth of poverty. For this purpose, the same institutions publish data on the poverty gap.

The international poverty line is designed to stay constant over time, to allow comparisons between different years. It is therefore a measure of absolute poverty and is not measuring relative poverty. It is also not designed to capture how people view their own financial situation (known as the socially subjective poverty line). Moreover, the calculation of the poverty line relies on information about consumer prices to calculate purchasing power parity, which are very hard to measure and are necessarily debatable. As with all other metrics, there may also be missing data from the poorest and most fragile countries.

Several alternative instruments for measuring extreme poverty have been suggested which incorporate other factors such as malnutrition and lack of access to a basic education. The Multidimensional Poverty Index (MPI), based on the Alkire–Foster Method, is published by the Oxford Poverty & Human Development Initiative (OPHI): it measures deprivation in basic needs and can be broken down to reflect both the incidence and the intensity of poverty. For example, under conventional measures, in both Chad and Guinea-Bissau about 40% of the population is considered extremely poor, but based on the MPI, 84% of Chadians and 64% of Bissau-Guineans are in multidimensional poverty.

The MPI is useful for development officials to determine the most likely causes of poverty within a region, using the M0 measure of the method (which is calculated by multiplying the fraction of people in poverty by the fraction of dimensions they are deprived in). For example, in the Gaza Strip of Palestine, using the M0 measure of the Alkire–Foster method reveals that poverty in the region is primarily caused by a lack of access to electricity, lack of access to drinking water, and widespread overcrowding. In contrast, data from the Chhukha District of Bhutan reveals that income is a much larger contributor to poverty as opposed to other dimensions within the region. However, the MPI only presents data from 105 countries, so it cannot be used for global measurements.

== Share of the population living in extreme poverty ==
Percentages of world's extreme poor by region (2025)
1. Sub-Saharan Africa (72.7%)
2. South Asia (11.7%)
3. East Asia & Pacific (5.00%)
4. Middle East & North Africa (5.37%)
5. Latin America & Caribbean (3.74%)
6. Other High Income Countries (0.96%)
7. Europe & Central Asia (0.53%)

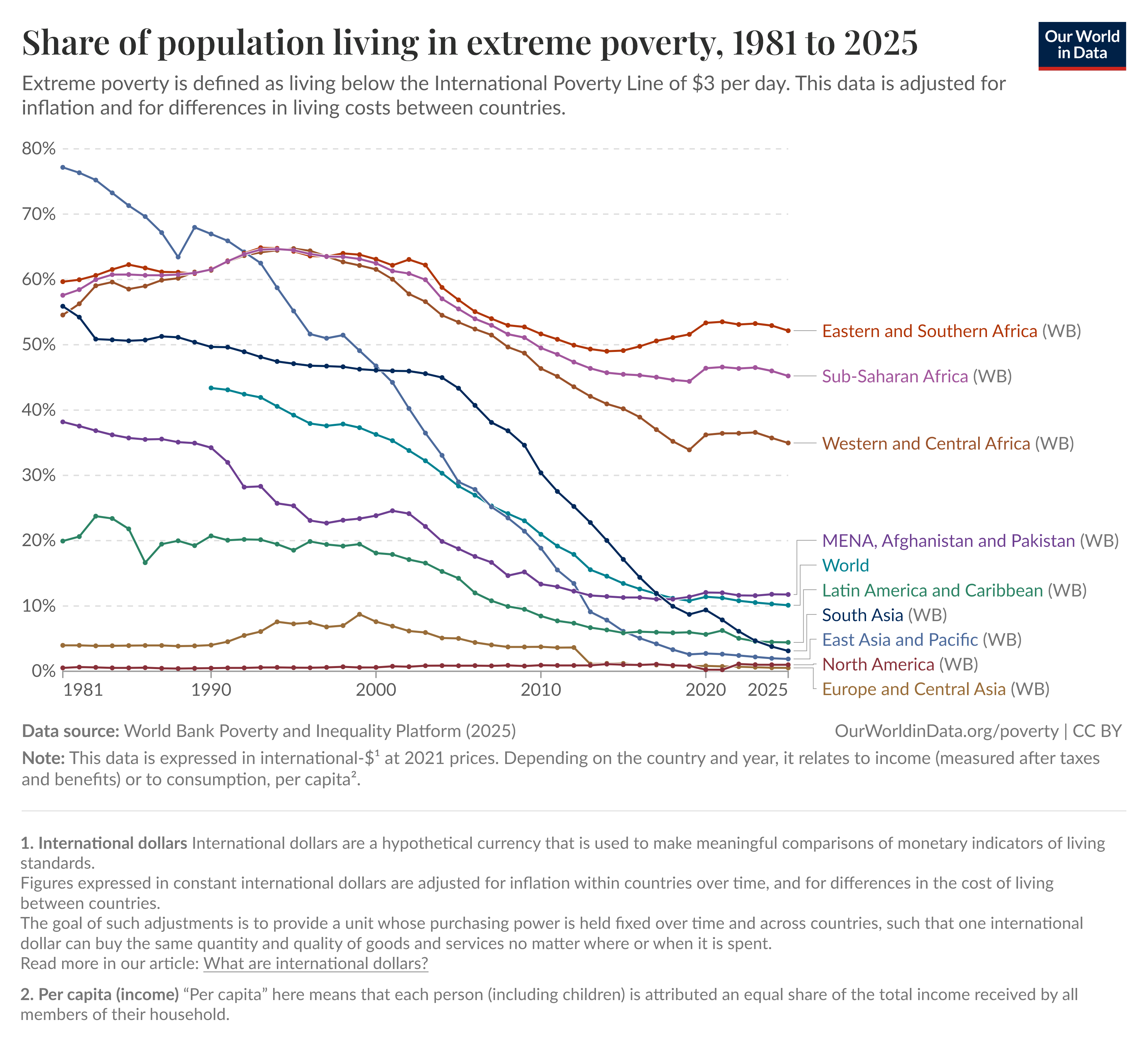
Line chart of the percent of certain regions living in extreme poverty from 1981 to 2025

Number of people pushed below the $3.00 ($2011 PPP) poverty line (in millions)
Region	1990	1995	2000	2005	2010	2015	2020	2025
North America	1.31	1.67	1.90	2.79	3.20	3.66	0.94	3.80
Latin America & Caribbean	91.36	89.18	94.16	79.01	49.73	36.40	36.41	29.45
Middle East & North Africa	131.24	111.21	117.91	104.42	83.35	78.47	91.17	97.19
South Asia	503.32	529.24	570.31	583.76	439.16	263.3	152.21	52.74
East Asia & Pacific	1217.27	1071.16	958.72	618.98	417.33	141.07	64.62	44.90
Europe & Central Asia	33.98	62.47	65.71	43.97	33.42	10.82	7.62	4.72
Sub-Saharan Africa	320.72	384.58	425.50	432.56	442.84	446.23	542.35	598.08
Total	2,300	2,250	2,230	1,870	1,470	1,000	895	831

== Current trends ==
=== Getting to zero ===
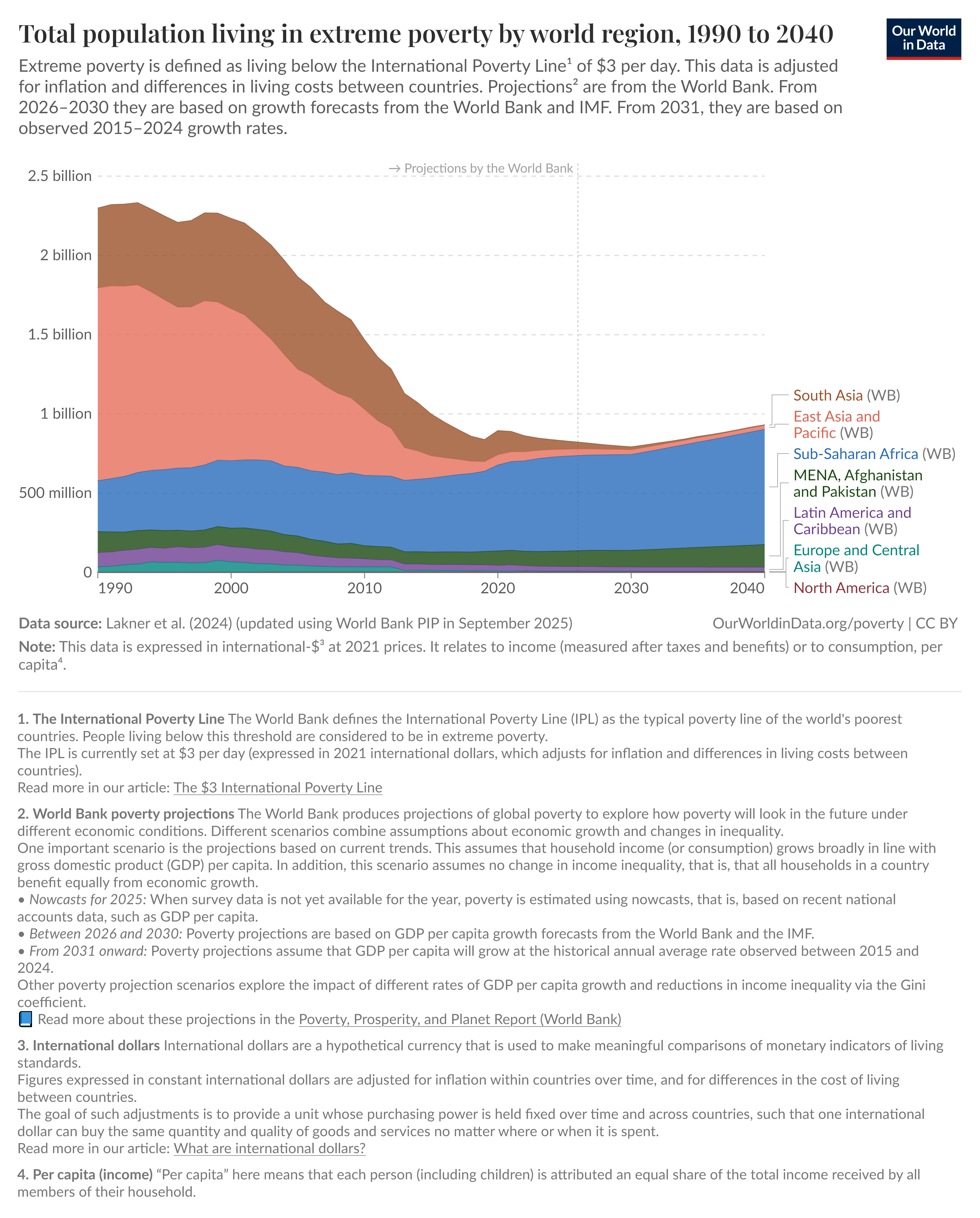
Stacked area chart of the total population living in extreme poverty by world region, 1990 to 2040

Using the World Bank definition of $3/day, as of 2021, roughly 613 million people remained in extreme poverty (or roughly 1 in 13 people worldwide). Nearly a quarter of them live in Nigeria and The Democratic Republic of the Congo. Since the mid-1990s, there has been a steady decline in both the worldwide poverty rate and the total number of extreme poor. In 1990, the percentage of the global population living in extreme poverty was 43%, but in 2015, that percentage had dropped down to 13.4%. This thirding of the extreme poverty rate falls in line with the first Millennium Development Goal (MDG1) proposed by former UN Secretary-General Kofi Annan, who called on the international community at the turn of the century to reduce the percentage of people in extreme poverty by half by 2015.

This reduction in extreme poverty took place most notably in China, India, Indonesia, and Pakistan. These five countries accounted for the alleviation of 1.5 billion people out of extreme poverty between 1990 and 2025, which would make the number of people in extreme poverty at around 820 million, less than the current amount of 831. This statistical oddity can be explained by the fact that the number of people living in extreme poverty in Sub-Saharan Africa rose from 321 million to 598 million over the same period. However, there have been many positive signs for extensive, global poverty reduction as well. Since 1990, the total number of people in extreme poverty has declined by an average of 42 million per year. Moreover, in 2005, for the first time in recorded history, poverty rates began to fall in every region of the world, including Africa.

As aforementioned, the number of people living in extreme poverty has reduced from 2.3 billion to 831 million over the span of the last decades. If we remain on our current trajectory, many economists predict we will still have 793 million people in poverty. Global zero entails a world in which fewer than 3% of the global population lives in extreme poverty (projected under most optimistic scenarios to be fewer than 200 million people). This zero figure is set at 3% in recognition of the fact that some amount of frictional (temporary) poverty will continue to exist, whether it is caused by political conflict or unexpected economic fluctuations, at least for the foreseeable future. However, the Brookings Institution notes that any projection about poverty more than a few years into the future runs the risk of being highly uncertain. This is because changes in consumption and distribution throughout the developing world over the next two decades could result in monumental shifts in global poverty, for better or worse.

More recent analyses in 2022 on real wages have questioned whether extreme poverty was a "natural" condition of humanity and decreased with the rise of capitalism.

=== Exacerbating factors ===
There are a variety of factors that may reinforce or instigate the existence of extreme poverty, such as weak institutions, cycles of violence and a low level of growth. Recent World Bank research shows that some countries can get caught in a "fragility trap", in which self-reinforcing factors prevent the poorest nations from emerging from low-level equilibrium in the long run. Moreover, most of the reduction in extreme poverty over the past twenty years has taken place in countries that have not experienced a civil conflict or have had governing institutions with a strong capacity to actually govern. Thus, to end extreme poverty, it is also important to focus on the interrelated problems of fragility and conflict.

USAID defines fragility as a government's lack of both legitimacy (the perception the government is adequate at doing its job) and effectiveness (how good the government is at maintaining law and order, in an equitable manner). As fragile nations are unable to equitably and effectively perform the functions of a state, these countries are much more prone to violent unrest and mass inequality. Additionally, in countries with high levels of inequality (a common problem in countries with inadequate governing institutions), much higher growth rates are needed to reduce the rate of poverty when compared with other nations. Additionally, up to 70% of the world's poor live in fragile states by some definitions of fragility. Extreme poverty has been increasingly concentrated in fragile, low-income states like Ethiopia, Nigeria and the Democratic Republic of the Congo. To help low-income earners, fragile states make the transition towards peace and prosperity, the New Deal for Engagement in Fragile States, endorsed by roughly forty countries and multilateral institutions, was created in 2011. This represents an important step towards redressing the problem of fragility as it was originally articulated by self-identified fragile states who called on the international community to not only "do things differently", but to also "do different things".

Civil conflict also remains a prime cause for the perpetuation of poverty throughout the developing world. Armed conflict can have severe effects on economic growth for many reasons such as the destruction of assets, destruction of livelihoods, creation of unwanted mass migration, and diversion of public resources towards war. Significantly, a country that experienced major violence during 1981–2005 had extreme poverty rates 21 percentage points higher than a country with no violence. On average, each civil conflict will cost a country roughly 30 years of GDP growth. Therefore, a renewed commitment from the international community to address the deteriorating situation in highly fragile states is necessary to both prevent the mass loss of life, but to also prevent the vicious cycle of extreme poverty.

Population trends and dynamics (e.g. population growth) can also have a large impact on prospects for poverty reduction. According to the United Nations, "in addition to improving general health and well-being, analysis shows that meeting the reproductive health and contraceptive needs of all women in the developing world more than pays for itself".

In 2013, a prominent finding in a report by the World Bank was that extreme poverty is most prevalent in low-income countries. In these countries, the World Bank found that progress in poverty reduction is the slowest, the poor live under the worst conditions, and the most affected persons are children age 12 and under.

== International initiatives ==
=== Millennium Summit and Millennium Development Goals ===
In September 2000, world leaders gathered at the Millennium Summit held in New York, launching the United Nations Millennium Project suggested by then UN Secretary-General Kofi Annan. Prior to the launch of the conference, the office of Secretary-General Annan released a report entitled "We The Peoples: The Role of the United Nations in the 21st Century". In this document, now widely known as the Millennium Report, Kofi Annan called on the international community to reduce the proportion of people in extreme poverty by half by 2015, a target that would affect over 1 billion people. Citing the close correlation between economic growth and the reduction of poverty in poor countries, Annan urged international leaders to indiscriminately target the problem of extreme poverty across every region. In charge of managing the project was Jeffrey Sachs, a noted development economist, who in 2005 released a plan for action called "Investing in Development: A Practical Plan to Achieve the Millennium Development Goals". Thomas Pogge criticized the 2000 Millennium Declaration for being less ambitious than a previous declaration from the World Food Summit due to using 1990 as the benchmark rather than 1996.

Overall, there has been significant progress towards reducing extreme poverty, with the MDG1 target of reducing extreme poverty rates by half being met five years early, representing 700 million people being lifted out of extreme poverty from 1990 to 2010, with 1.2 billion people still remaining under those conditions. The notable exception to this trend was in Sub-Saharan Africa, the only region where the number of people living in extreme poverty rose from 321 million in 1990 to 598 million in 2025, comprising more than half of those living in extreme poverty worldwide.

==== 2005 World Summit ====
The 2005 World Summit, held in September which was organized to measure international progress towards fulfilling the Millennium Development Goals (MDGs). Notably, the conference brought together more than 170 Heads of State. While world leaders at the summit were encouraged by the reduction of poverty in some nations, they were concerned by the uneven decline of poverty within and among different regions of the globe. However, at the end of the summit, the conference attendees reaffirmed the UN's commitment to achieve the MDGs by 2015 and urged all supranational, national and non-governmental organizations to follow suit.

=== Sustainable Development Goals ===
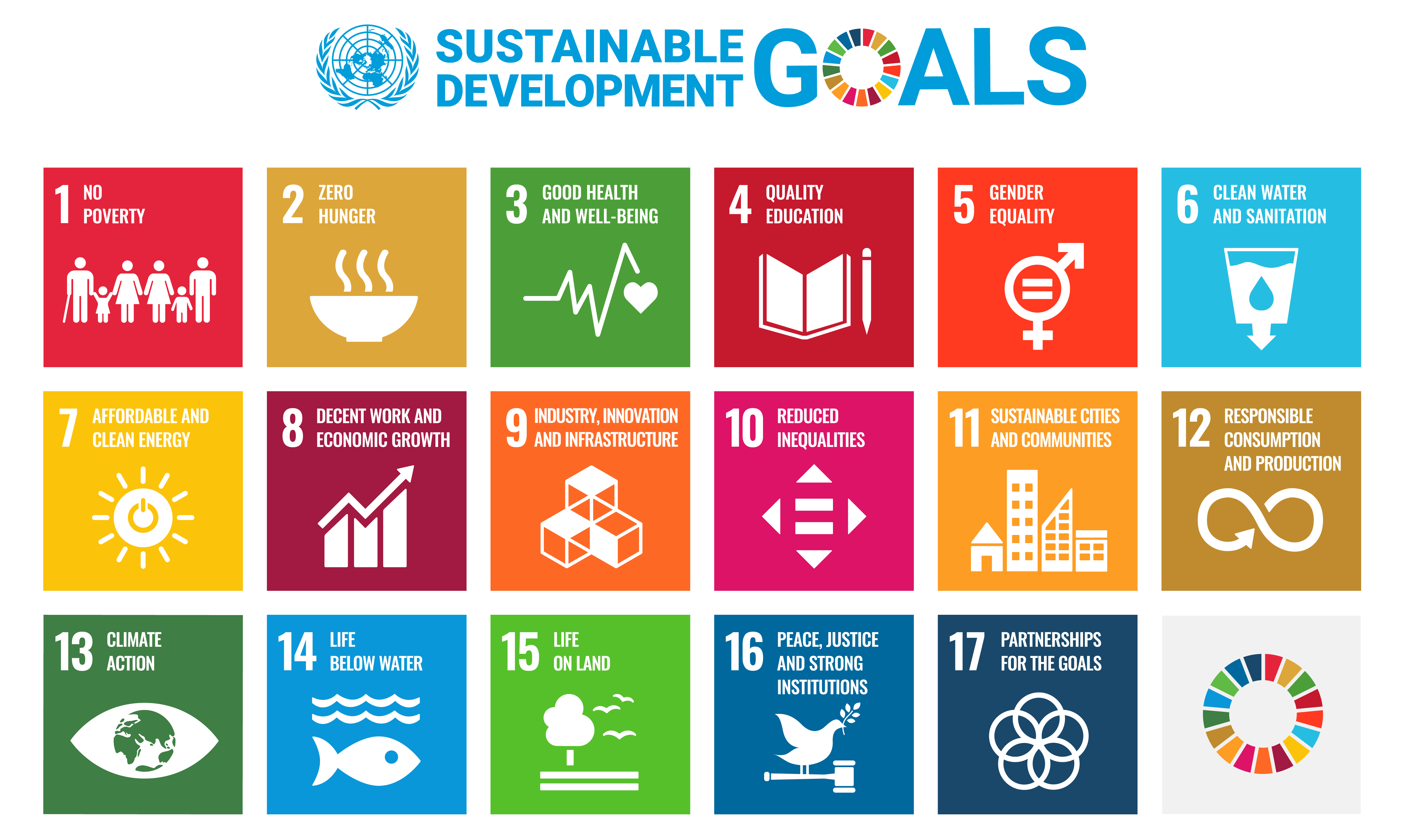
Sustainable Development Goals

As the expiration of the Millennium Development Goals approached in 2015, the UN convened a panel to advise on a Post-2015 Development Agenda, which led to a new set of 17 goals for 2030 titled the Sustainable Development Goals (SDGs). The first goal (SDG 1) is to "End poverty in all its forms everywhere."

The HLP report, entitled A New Global Partnership: Eradicate Poverty and Transform Economies Through Sustainable Development, was published in May 2013. In the report, the HLP wrote that:

Ending extreme poverty is just the beginning, not the end. It is vital, but our vision must be broader: to start countries on the path of sustainable development – building on the foundations established by the 2012 UN Conference on Sustainable Development in Rio de Janeiro, and meeting a challenge that no country, developed or developing, has met so far. We recommend to the Secretary-General that deliberations on a new development agenda must be guided by the vision of eradicating extreme poverty once and for all, in the context of sustainable development.

Therefore, the report determined that a central goal of the Post-Millennium Development agenda is to eradicate extreme poverty by 2030. However, the report also emphasized that the MDGs were not enough on their own, as they did not "focus on the devastating effects of conflict and violence on development ... the importance to development of good governance and institution ... nor the need for inclusive growth..." Consequently, there now exists synergy between the policy position papers put forward by the United States (through USAID), the World Bank and the UN itself in terms of viewing fragility and a lack of good governance as exacerbating extreme poverty. However, in a departure from the views of other organizations, the commission also proposed that the UN focus not only on extreme poverty (a line drawn at $1.25), but also on a higher target, such as $2. The report notes this change could be made to reflect the fact that escaping extreme poverty is only a first step.

In addition to the UN, a host of other supranational and national actors such as the European Union and the African Union have published their own positions or recommendations on what should be incorporated in the Post-2015 agenda. The European Commission's communication, published in A decent Life for all: from vision to collective action, affirmed the UN's commitment to "eradicate extreme poverty in our lifetime and put the world on a sustainable path to ensure a decent life for all by 2030". A unique vision of the report was the commission's environmental focus (in addition to a plethora of other goals such as combating hunger and gender inequality). Specifically, the Commission argued, "long-term poverty reduction ... requires inclusive and sustainable growth. Growth should create decent jobs, take place with resource efficiency and within planetary boundaries, and should support efforts to mitigate climate change." The African Union's report, entitled Common African Position (CAP) on the Post-2015 Development Agenda, likewise encouraged the international community to focus on eradicating the twin problems of poverty and exclusion in our lifetime. Moreover, the CAP pledged that "no person – regardless of ethnicity, gender, geography, disability, race or other status – is denied universal human rights and basic economic opportunities".

=== Least developed country conferences ===
The UN least developed country (LDC) conferences were a series of summits organized by the UN to promote the substantial and even development of the world's least developed countries.

== Organizations working to end extreme poverty ==
=== International organizations ===
==== World Bank ====
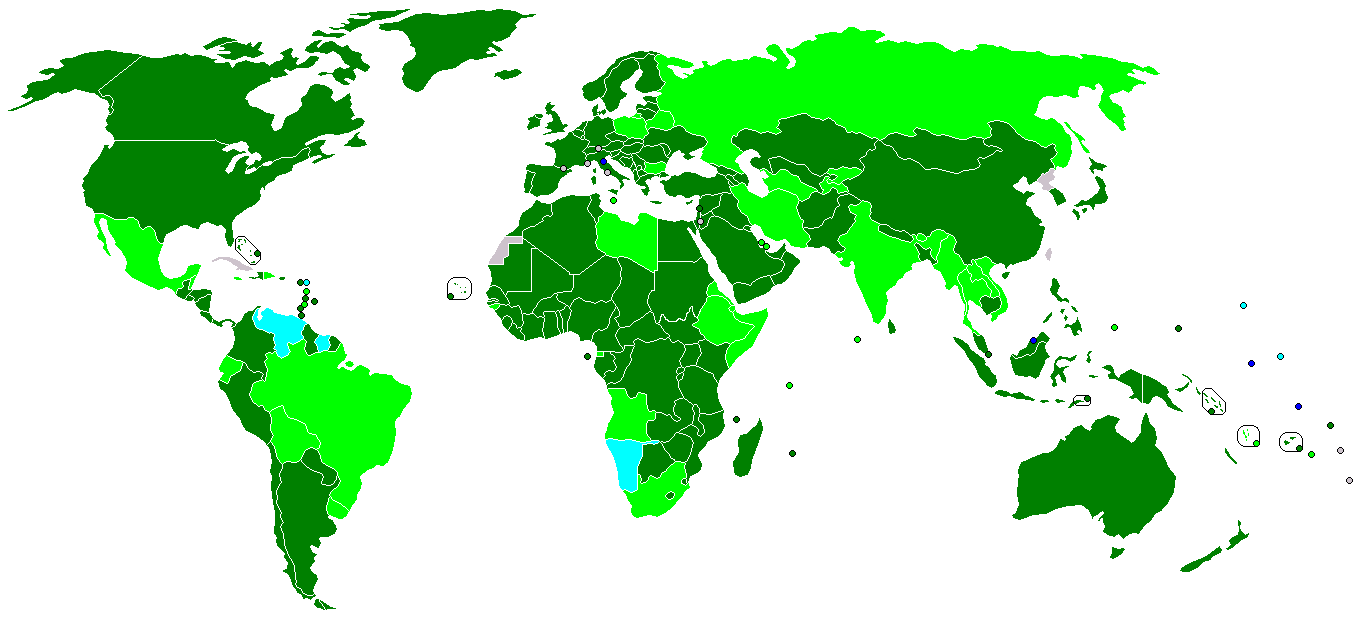
Nations of the World Bank Group (WBG)

World Bank logo

In 2013, the Board of Governors of the World Bank Group (WBG) set two overriding goals for the WBG to commit itself to in the future. First, to end extreme poverty by 2030, an objective that echoes the sentiments of the UN and the Obama administration. Additionally, the WBG set an interim target of reducing extreme poverty to below 9% by 2020, which was not reached. Second, to focus on growth among the bottom 40% of people, as opposed to standard GDP growth. This commitment ensures that the growth of the developing world lifts people out of poverty, rather than exacerbating inequality.

As the World Bank's primary focus is on delivering economic growth to enable equitable prosperity, its developments programs are primarily commercial-based in nature, as opposed to the UN. Since the World Bank recognizes better jobs will result in higher income, and thus less poverty, the WBG seeks to support employment training initiatives, small business development programs and strong labor protection laws. However, since much of the growth in the developing world has been inequitable, the World Bank has also begun teaming with client states to map out trends in inequality and to propose public policy changes that can level the playing field.

Moreover, the World Bank engages in a variety of nutritional, transfer payments and transport-based initiatives. Children who experience under-nutrition from conception to two years of age have a much higher risk of physical and mental disability. Thus, they are often trapped in poverty and are unable to make a full contribution to the social and economic development of their communities as adults. The WBG estimates that as much as 3% of GDP can be lost as a result of under-nutrition among the poorest nations. To combat undernutrition, the WBG has partnered with UNICEF and the WHO to ensure all small children are fully fed. The WBG also offers conditional cash transfers to poor households who meet certain requirements such as maintaining children's healthcare or ensuring school attendance. Finally, the WBG understands investment in public transportation and better roads is key to breaking rural isolation, improving access to healthcare and providing better job opportunities for the World's poor.

==== United Nations ====
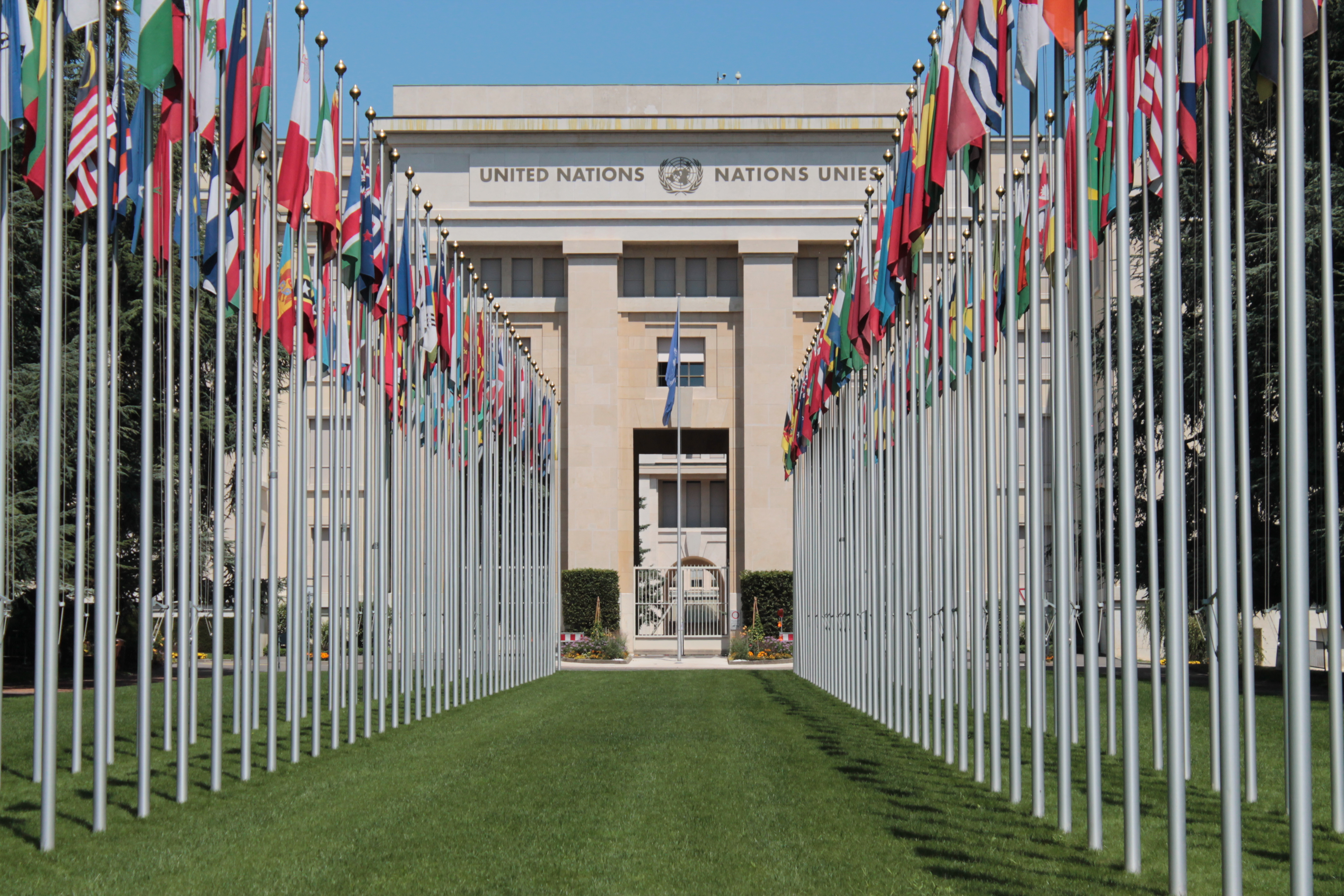
United Nations Headquarters, Geneva

United Nations Office for the Coordination of Humanitarian Affairs Logo

The UN Office for the Coordination of Humanitarian Affairs (OCHA) works to synchronize the disparate international, national and non-governmental efforts to contest poverty. OCHA seeks to prevent "confusion" in relief operations and to ensure that the humanitarian response to disaster situations has greater accountability and predictability. To do so, OCHA has begun deploying Humanitarian Coordinators and Country Teams to provide a solid architecture for the international community to work through.

The United Nations' Children's Fund (UNICEF) was created by the UN to provide food, clothing and healthcare to European children facing famine and disease in the immediate aftermath of World War II. After the UN General Assembly extended UNICEF's mandate indefinitely in 1953, it actively worked to help children in extreme poverty in more than 190 countries and territories to overcome the obstacles that poverty, violence, disease and discrimination place in a child's path. Its current focus areas are 1) Child survival & development 2) Basic education & gender equality 3) Children and HIV/AIDS and 4) Child protection.

The UN Refugee Agency (UNHCR) is mandated to lead and coordinate international action to protect refugees worldwide. Its primary purpose is to safeguard the rights of refugees by ensuring anyone can exercise the right to seek asylum in another state, with the option to return home voluntarily, integrate locally or resettle in a third country. The UNHCR operates in over 125 countries, helping approximately 33.9 million persons.

The World Food Programme (WFP) is the largest agency dedicated to fighting hunger worldwide. On average, the WFP brings food assistance to more than 90 million people in 75 countries. The WFP not only strives to prevent hunger in the present, but also in the future by developing stronger communities which will make food even more secure on their own. The WFP has a range of expertise from Food Security Analysis, Nutrition, Food Procurement and Logistics.

The World Health Organization (WHO) is responsible for providing leadership on global health matters, shaping the health research agenda, articulating evidence-based policy decisions and combating diseases that are induced from poverty, such as HIV/AIDS, malaria and tuberculosis. Moreover, the WHO deals with pressing issues ranging from managing water safety, to dealing with maternal and newborn health.

=== Governmental agencies ===
==== USAID ====
USAID logo

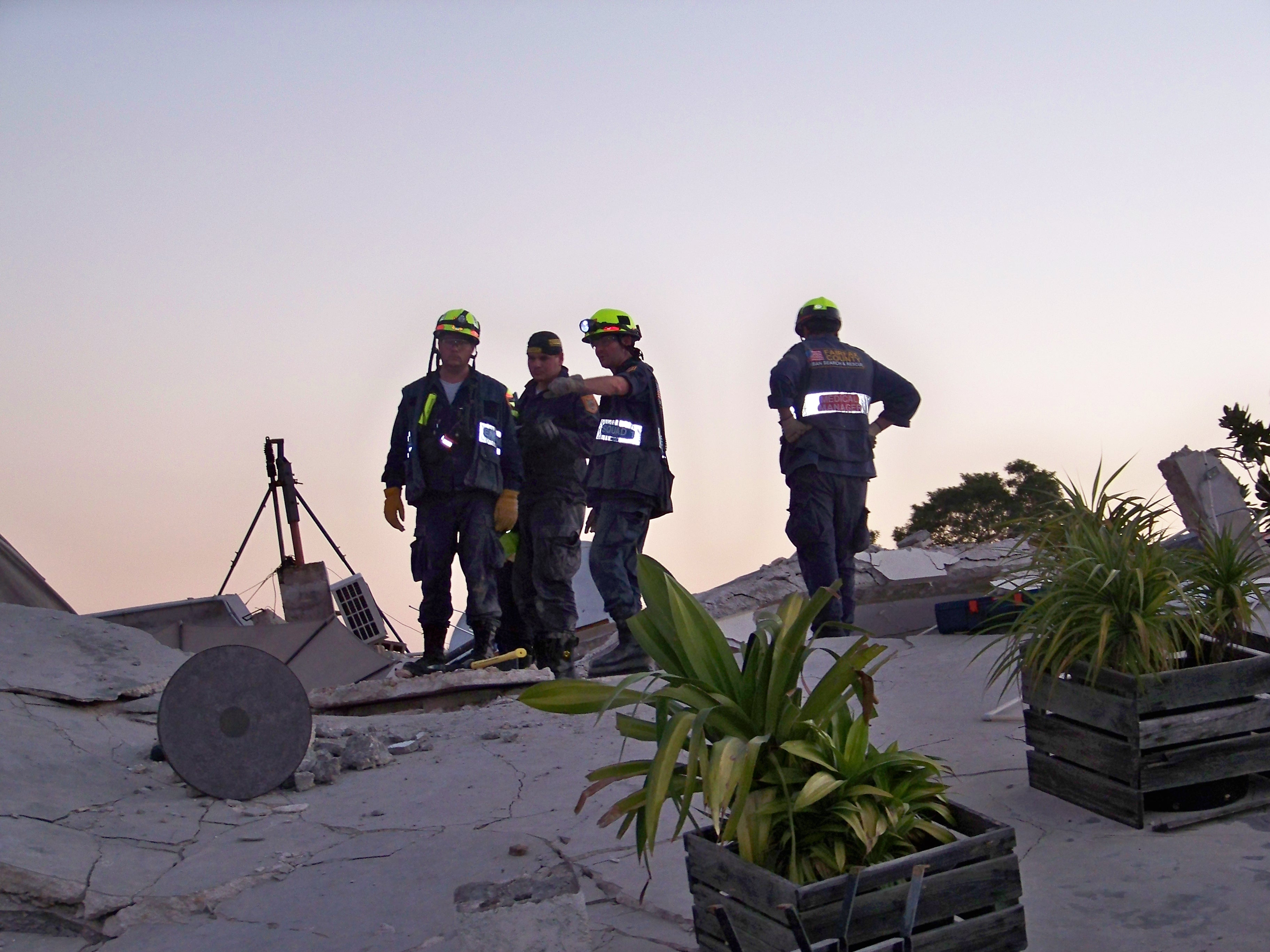
USAID Urban Search and Rescue team Fairfax County performs search and rescue operations in Haiti, 17 January 2010.

The US Agency for International Development (USAID) was the lead US government agency dedicated to ending extreme poverty. It was the largest bilateral donor in the world, and the United States channeled the majority of its development assistance through USAID and the US Department of State, up until 2025. In President Obama's 2013 State of the Union address, he declared, "So the United States will join with our allies to eradicate such extreme poverty in the next two decades ... which is within our reach." In response to Obama's call to action, USAID had made ending extreme poverty central to its mission statement. Under its New Model of Development, USAID sought to eradicate extreme poverty through the use of innovation in science and technology, by putting a greater emphasis on evidence based decision-making, and through leveraging the ingenuity of the private sector and global citizens.

A major initiative from the Obama administration was Power Africa, which brought energy to 28 million people in Sub-Saharan Africa. By reaching out to its international partners, whether commercial or public, the US had leveraged over $14 billion in outside commitments after investing only US$7 billion of its own. To ensure that Power Africa reaches the region's poorest, the initiative engaged in a transaction based approach to create systematic change. This includes expanding access to electricity to more than 20,000 additional households which had lived without power.

In terms of specific programming, USAID worked in a variety of fields from preventing hunger, reducing HIV/AIDS, providing general health assistance and democracy assistance, as well as dealing with gender issues. To deal with food security, which affects roughly 817 million people (who go to bed hungry each night), USAID coordinates the Feed the Future Initiative (FtF). FtF aims to reduce poverty and under-nutrition each by 20% over five years. However, in 5 years, it did not reach the requirements for both poverty & under-nutrition. Because of the President's Emergency Plan for AIDS Relief (PEPFAR) and a variety of congruent actors, the incidence of AIDS and HIV, which used to ravage Africa, reduced in scope and intensity. Through PEPFAR, the United States has ensured over five million people have received life-saving antiviral drugs, a significant proportion of the eight million people receiving treatment in relatively poor nations.

In terms of general health assistance, USAID had worked to reduce maternal mortality by over 30%, under-five child mortality by over 35%, and has accomplished a host of other goals. USAID also supported the gamut of democratic initiatives, from promoting human rights and accountable, fair governance, to supporting free and fair elections and the rule of law. In pursuit of these goals, USAID has increased global political participation by training more than 9,800 domestic election observers and providing civic education to more than 6.5 million people. From 2012 to 2025, the Agency had begun integrating critical gender perspectives across all aspects of its programming to ensure all USAID initiatives work to eliminate gender disparities. To do so, USAID sought to increase the capability of women and girls to realize their rights and determine their own life outcomes. Moreover, USAID supported additional programs to improve women's access to capital and markets, builds theirs skills in agriculture, and supports women's desire to own businesses.

==== Others ====
Other major government development agencies with annual aid programmes of more than $10 billion include: GIZ (Germany), FCDO (United Kingdom), JICA (Japan), European Union and AFD (France).

=== Non-governmental organizations ===
A multitude of non-governmental organizations (NGOs) operate in the field of extreme poverty, working to alleviate the conditions of those in extreme poverty. Some notable organizations include: Save the Children, the Overseas Development Institute, Concern Worldwide, ONE, Trickle Up and Oxfam.

Save the Children is the leading international organization dedicated to helping the world's indigent children. In 2013, Save the Children reached over 143 million children through their work, including over 52 million children directly. Save the Children also released their own report on "Getting to Zero" in 2015, in which they argued the international community could feasibly do more than lift the world's poor above $1.25/day.

The Overseas Development Institute (ODI) is a UK based think tank on international development and humanitarian issues. ODI is dedicated to alleviating the suffering of the world's poor by providing high-quality research and practical policy advice to the World's development officials. ODI also released a paper in 2014 entitled "The Chronic Poverty Report 2014–2015: The road to zero extreme poverty", in which its authors assert that though the international communities' goal of ending extreme poverty by 2030 is laudable, much more targeted resources will be necessary to reach said target. The report states that "To eradicate extreme poverty, massive global investment is required in social assistance, education and pro-poorest economic growth".

Concern Worldwide is an international humanitarian organization whose mission is to end extreme poverty by influencing decision makers at all levels of government (from local to international). Concern has also produced a report on extreme poverty in which they explain their own conception of extreme poverty from a NGO's standpoint. In this paper, named "How Concern Understands Extreme Poverty", the report's creators write that extreme poverty entails more than just living under $1.25/day, it also includes having a small number of assets and being vulnerable to severe negative shocks (whether natural or man made).

ONE, the organization co-founded by Bono, is a non-profit organization funded almost entirely by foundations, individual philanthropists and corporations. ONE's goals include raising public awareness and working with political leaders to fight preventable diseases, increase government accountability and increase investment in nutrition. Finally, Trickle Up is a micro-enterprise development program targeted at those living on under $1.25/day, which provides the indigent with resources to build a sustainable livelihood through both direct financing and considerable training efforts.

Oxfam is a non-governmental organization that works prominently in Africa; their mission is to improve local community organizations and it works to reduce impediments to the development of the country. Oxfam helps families suffering from poverty receive food and healthcare to survive. There are many children in Africa experiencing growth stunting, and this is one example of an issue that Oxfam targets and aims to resolve.

Religious organizations which focus on "the poorest of the poor" or "the most destitute" include the Missionaries of Charity and the Missionaries of the Poor.

Cash transfers appear to be an effective intervention for reducing extreme poverty, while at the same time improving health and education outcomes.

==== Campaigns ====
- Giving What We Can
- Global Poverty Project
- Live Below the Line
- Make Poverty History

== See also ==
- Cost of poverty
- Income inequality metrics
- Least developed countries
- List of countries by percentage of population living in poverty
- Millennium Development Goals (2015)
- Poverty reduction
- Poverty threshold
- Sustainable Development Goals (2030)
