= International Day for the Eradication of Poverty =

International observance on October 17

The International Day for the Eradication of Poverty is an international observance celebrated each year on October 17 throughout the world. The first commemoration, "World Day to Overcome Poverty" took place in Paris, France, in 1987 when 100,000 people gathered on the Human Rights and Liberties Plaza at the Trocadéro to honour victims of poverty, hunger, violence, and fear at the unveiling of a commemorative stone by Joseph Wresinski, founder of the International Movement ATD Fourth World. In 1992, four years after Wresinski's death, the United Nations officially designated October 17 as the International Day for the Eradication of Poverty.

The October 17 Commemorative Stone, that Father Joseph Wesinski unveiled at the Trocadero Plaza in 1987 is recognised as a symbol of humanity, which enshrines his words

Wherever men and women are condemned to live in extreme poverty, human rights are violated. To come together to ensure that these rights be respected is our solemn duty.

— Joseph Wresinski, Text Engraved on Original Commemorative Stone in Paris

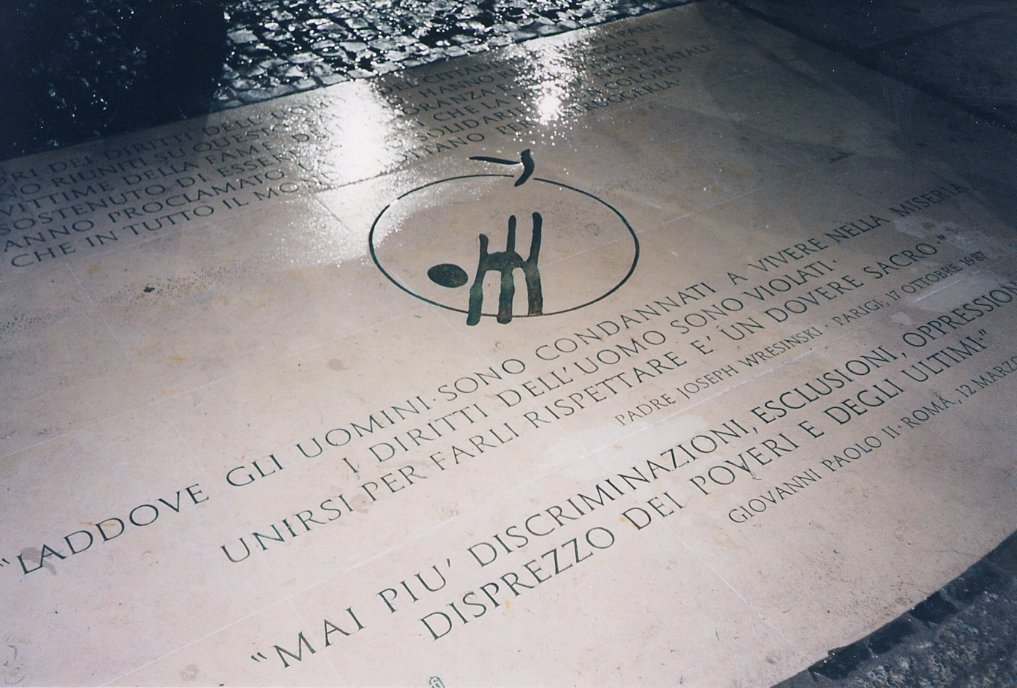
Replica of the October 17 Commemorative Stone, Rome - Italy

To date, there is a total of 53 replicas of the Commemorative Stone around the world including countries like Belgium, Burkina Faso, Canada, Germany, Philippines, Portugal Reunion Island, Switzerland, the UK and the USA. Replicas of the commemorative stone can also be found at the Council of Europe in Strasbourg and the United Nations headquarters in New York.

The International Day for the Eradication of Poverty promotes dialogue and understanding between people living in poverty and their communities, and society at large. “It represents an opportunity to acknowledge the efforts and struggles of people living in poverty, a chance for them to make their concerns heard and a moment to recognise that poor people are in the forefront in the fight against poverty.” (United Nations, Report of the Secretary General, A/61/308, para. 58).

The International Committee for October 17 was launched in 2008 to promote the International Day for the Eradication of Poverty in its founding spirit. The composition of the committee is unique with members including people with lived experience of extreme poverty and human rights defenders engaged in the fight against poverty. Every year, the International Committee engages in a consultation process through the Forum on Overcoming Poverty to select a theme for the annual observance of October 17 by the UN with input from people with lived experience of poverty.

== Purpose and philosophy ==
Early in his career as an activist, Wresinski recognized that governments often ignored the plight of those living in poverty, leading to feelings of rejection, shame, and humiliation. As a result, one of the primary goals of the Day is to recognize the struggles of the impoverished and to make their voices heard by governments and citizens. Participation by the poorest of people is an important aspect of the observance of the Day.

== See also ==
- International Year of the Child
- Poverty reduction
