= Henri de Gaulle =

French civil servant

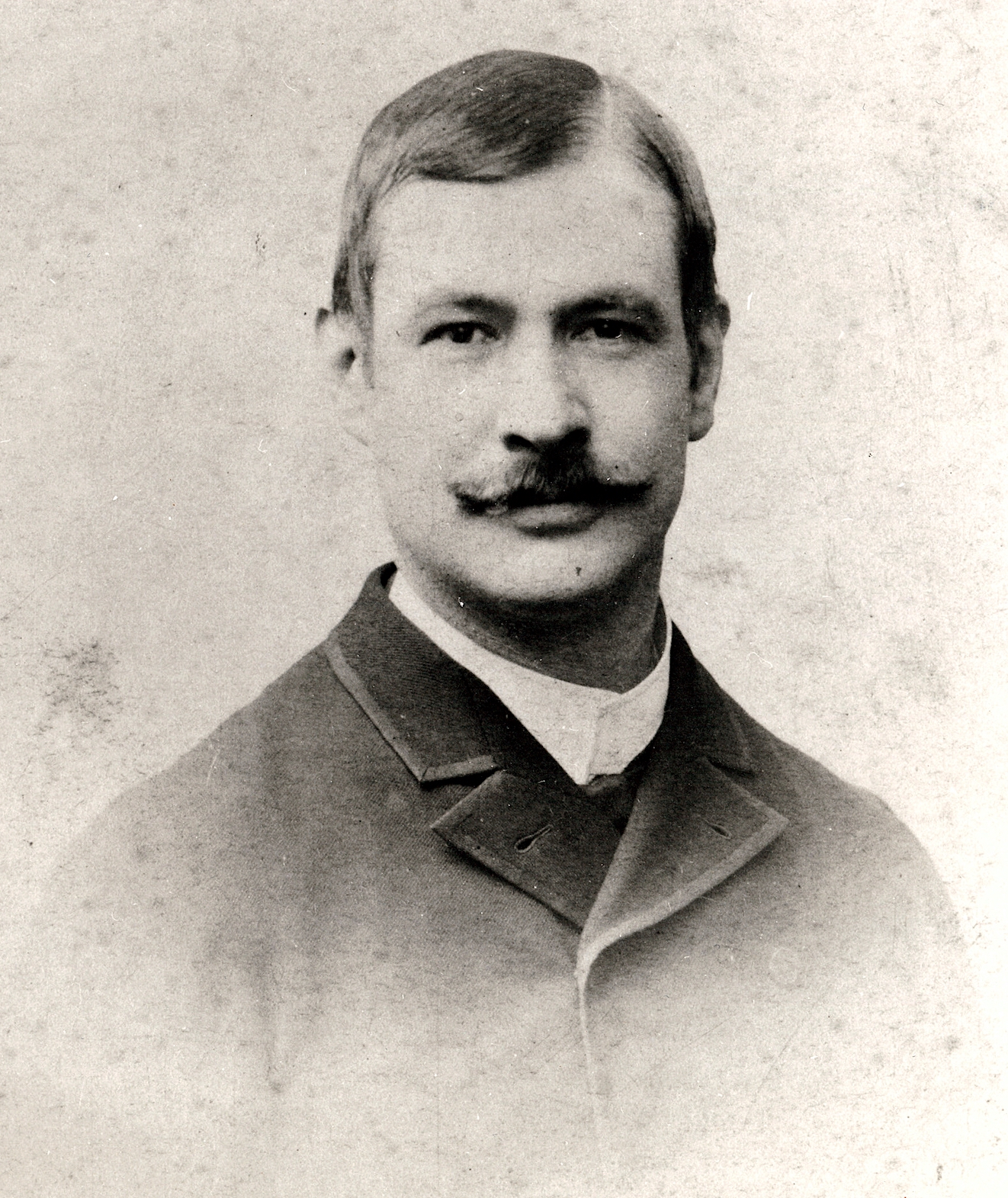
- Born: 22 November 1848; Paris, France
- Died: 3 May 1932 (aged 83); Sainte-Adresse, France
- Occupations: Civil servant, teacher
- Spouse: Jeanne Maillot
- Children: Xavier; Marie-Agnès Cailliau; Charles; Jacques; Pierre
- Parent(s): Julien Philippe de Gaulle; Joséphine Marie Anne Maillot

Henri Charles Alexandre de Gaulle (French: [də ɡol]; 22 November 1848 – 3 May 1932) was a French civil servant and later a schoolteacher. He was the father of Charles de Gaulle, a general of the French army and President of France.

== Biography ==
=== Early life ===
Henri de Gaulle was born on 22 November 1848 in Paris. His father, Julien Philippe de Gaulle, was an historian. His mother was Joséphine Marie Anne (Maillot) de Gaulle.

Henri de Gaulle came from a long line of parliamentary gentry from Normandy and Burgundy. The name is thought to be Dutch in origin, and may have derived from van der Walle, de Walle ("from the rampart, defensive wall") or de Waal ("the wall").

=== Career ===
He volunteered in the Franco-Prussian War; his men chose him as their second lieutenant on several occasions.

A civil servant in the interior ministry for fifteen years, in 1884 he resigned his post to protest against the anti-clerical policies of the Third Republic.

A "monarchist in feeling and a republican in thought" (monarchiste de regret et républicain de raison), as he liked to call himself, Henri de Gaulle began working at a Jesuit high school in Paris, teaching French, Latin and Ancient Greek. Among his students were his four sons, as well as Georges Bernanos and the future marshals Philippe Leclerc and Jean de Lattre de Tassigny. He was nicknamed PDG (père de Gaulle – "Father de Gaulle"), but was respected and esteemed for the quality of his teaching.

=== Personal life ===
On 2 August 1886 he married his second cousin, Jeanne Maillot (28 April 1860, Lille – 16 July 1940, Sainte-Addresse), with whom he had a daughter and four sons:

- Xavier Joseph Marie (1887–1955)
- Marie-Agnès Caroline Julie (1889–1982)
- Charles André Joseph Marie (1890–1970)
- Jacques Henri Jules Marie (1893–1946)
- Pierre Julien Joseph Marie (1897–1959)

He retired with his wife to Sainte-Adresse, close to Le Havre, at the home of their daughter Marie-Agnès Cailliau. There, he helped his son Charles refine his first military books.

=== Death ===
He died at Sainte-Adresse, on 3 May 1932, and is buried there with his wife.

== See also ==
- de Gaulle family
