= Germaine Tillion =

French anthropologist, member of the French Resistance in World War II (1907–2008)

- Born: 30 May 1907; Allègre, France
- Died: 18 April 2008 (aged 100); Saint-Mandé, France
- Resting place: Panthéon, Paris
- Education: École du Louvre; École Pratique des Hautes Études; École des langues orientales
- Occupation: Anthropologist
- Employer: École Pratique des Hautes Études
- Mother: Émilie Tillion

Germaine Tillion (French: [ʒɛʁmɛn tijɔ̃]; 30 May 1907 – 18 April 2008) was a French ethnologist, known for her work in Algeria in the 1950s on behalf of the Government of France. A member of the French Resistance in World War II, she spent time in Ravensbrück concentration camp.

== Biography ==
Tillion was born on May 30, 1907, in Allegre (Haute-Loire) in south-central France. She was the daughter of Lucien Tillion, a magistrate, and Émilie Cussac Tillion. Her mother was also noted as an art historian and a French resistance fighter. She had a sister called Francoise. Germaine Tillion's family belongs to the french bourgeoisie, they are both republicans and catholics.

=== Youth and studies ===
Tillion spent her youth with her family in Clermont-Ferrand. At the age of 8, Germaine Tillion and her sister Françoise Tillion were sent to Jeanne d'Arc Institution, in Clermont-Ferrand. She studied there from primary to secondary school, at the start of World War One.

In 1922, her parents moved to Saint-Maur, in her maternal grandparents' house, François Cussac (1849-1927) et Marie-Antoinette Vivier (1851-1945).

She left for Paris to study social anthropology with Marcel Mauss and Louis Massignon, obtaining degrees from the École pratique des hautes études, the École du Louvre, and the INALCO. Four times between 1934 and 1940 she did fieldwork in Algeria, studying the Chaoui Berber people in the Aures region of northeastern Algeria, to prepare for her doctorate in anthropology.

=== French Resistance ===
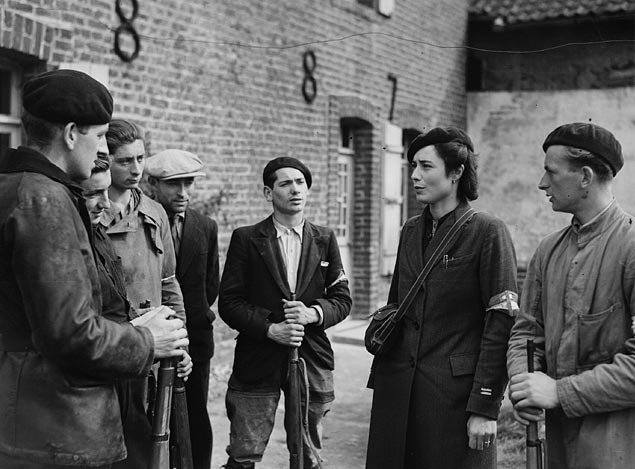
French resistance in 1944

As Tillion returned to Paris from the field in 1940, France had been invaded by Germany. As her first act of resistance, she helped a Jewish family by giving them her family's papers. She became one of the members in the French Resistance in the network of the Musée de l'Homme in Paris. Her missions included helping prisoners to escape and organizing intelligence for the allied forces from 1940 to 1942.

Betrayed by the priest Robert Alesch who had joined her resistance network and gained her confidence, she was arrested on August 13, 1942. She was transported in the Convoi des 31000 in 1943.

=== Ravensbrück ===
On 21 October 1943, Tillion was sent to the German concentration camp of Ravensbrück, near Berlin with her mother, Émilie, also a résistante. From her arrival on 21 October 1943 to the fall of the camp in spring 1945, she secretly wrote an operetta comedy to entertain the fellow prisoners. "Le Verfügbar aux Enfers" describes the camp life of the "Verfügbar" (German for "available", the lowest class of prisoners who could be used for any kind of work). At the same time she undertook a precise ethnographic analysis of the concentration camp. Other prisoners included Geneviève de Gaulle-Anthonioz, Jacqueline Fleury and Fleury's mother.

Her mother was killed in the camp in March 1945. Tillion escaped Ravensbrück in the spring of that year in a rescue operation of the Swedish Red Cross that had been negotiated by Folke Bernadotte.

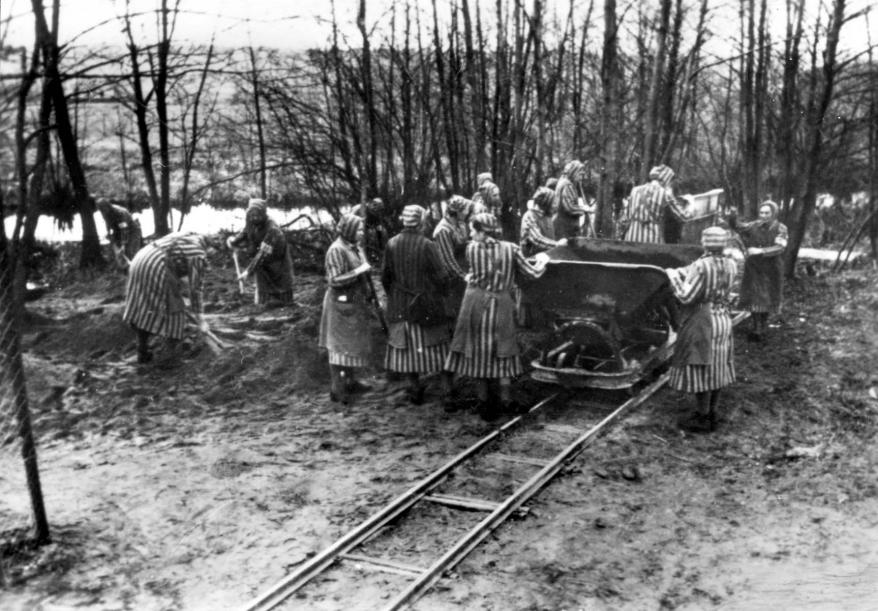
Female prisoners in Ravensbrück

In 1946, she published a text entitled “A la recherche de la verité” ("In search of truth"), in the collective volume Ravensbrück (Neuchâtel: Éditions de la Baconnière). In 1973 and 1988, she published revised and expanded versions detailing both her own personal experiences as an inmate as well as her remarkable contemporary and post-war research into the functioning of the camps, movements of prisoners, administrative operations and covert and overt crimes committed by the SS. She reported the presence of a gas chamber at Ravensbruck when other scholars had written that none existed in the Western camps, and affirmed that executions escalated during the waning days of the war, a chilling tribute to the efficiency and automated nature of the Nazi "killing machines."

She documented the dual but conflicting purposes of the camps; on the one hand, to carry out the Final Solution as quickly as possible, and on the other, to manage a very large and profitable slave labor force in support of the war effort (with profits reportedly going to SS leadership, a business structure created by Himmler himself).

Finally, she gives chilling vignettes of prisoners, prison staff, and the "professionals" who were central to the operation and execution of increasingly bizarre Nazi mandates in an attempt to explore the twisted psychology and outright evil behavior of often average participants who were instrumental in allowing, and then nurturing the death machines.

=== After the war ===
After the war, Tillion worked on the history of the Second World War, the war crimes of the Nazis and the Soviet Gulags from 1945 to 1954. She started an education program for French prisoners. As a professor (directeur d'études) of the École des hautes études en sciences sociales she undertook 20 scientific missions in North Africa and the Middle East.

=== Algerian war ===
Tillion returned to Algeria in 1954 to observe and analyze the situation at the brink of the Algerian War of Independence. She described as the principal cause of the conflict the pauperization ("clochardisation") of the Algerian population. In order to ameliorate the situation, she launched 'Social Centres' in October 1955, intended to make available higher education as well as vocational training to the rural population, allowing them to survive in the cities.

On 4 July 1957, during the battle of Algiers, she secretly met with National Liberation Front leader Yacef Saadi, at the instigation of the latter, to try to end the spiral of executions and indiscriminate attacks. Tillion was among the first to denounce the use of torture by French forces in the war. At the same time, she attended the International Meetings of the monastery of Toumliline in Morocco, conferences on contemporary challenges and interreligious dialogue.

=== Later life ===
Tillion remained vocal on several political topics:

- against the pauperization of the Algerian population
- against the French use of torture in Algeria
- for the emancipation of women in the Mediterranean

In 2004, along with several other French intellectuals, she launched a statement against torture in Iraq.

To celebrate her 100th birthday, her operetta "Le Verfügbar aux Enfers" premiered in 2007 at the Théâtre du Châtelet in Paris. She was Honorary Professor at France's School of Advanced Studies in the Social Sciences (EHESS) at the time of her death in 2008.

== Honours ==
=== Medals and awards ===
- Grand-croix de la Légion d'honneur (Only five women ever received this award.)
- Grand-Croix de l'Ordre national du Mérite
- Prix mondial Cino Del Duca (1977)
- Croix de Guerre 1939-1945
- Médaille de la Résistance
- Médaille de la déportation et de l'internement pour faits de Résistance
- Grand Cross of the German Merit (2004)
- On 21 February 2014, French President Francois Hollande announced that she would be interred in the Panthéon. She was interred there in May 2015 in a symbolic burial. The coffin of Germaine Tillion at the Panthéon does not contain her remains but soil from her gravesite, because her family didn't want the body itself moved.
- On 11 May 2015, the Maison des Sciences Humaines (MSH) at the University of Angers, a social science research center, was renamed after her and became Maison de la Recherche Germaine Tillion.

=== Tributes ===
- The Musée de l'Homme paid tribute to Germaine Tillion with the exhibition “Germaine Tillion: Ethnologue et résistante” (May 30, 2008 - September 8, 2008).
- On February 21, 2014, President François Hollande announced the transfer of her remains to the Panthéon alongside resistance fighters Pierre Brossolette and Geneviève de Gaulle, as well as former minister Jean Zay.
- Exhibitions-tributes to Germaine Tillion presented from May 26 to September 20, 2015 by the Musée de la Résistance et de la Déportation and museum Comtois in the Citadelle of Besançon.

== Publications ==
- L'Algérie aurésienne (in French). a collaboration with Nancy Woods. Martinière. 2001. ISBN 2-7324-2769-1.
- Tillion, Germaine (2000). Il était une fois l'ethnographie. Biographie (in French). Seuil. ISBN 2-02-025702-5.
- Les ennemis complémentaires (in French). 1960.
- Le harem et les cousins (in French). 1966.
- Algeria: The Realities. Translated by Ronald Matthews. Knopf. 1958.
- L'Algérie en 1957 (in French). 1956.
- L'Afrique bascule vers l'avenir (in French). 1959.
- Tillion, Germaine (1975) [1st pub. Les cahiers du Rhône:1946 (French)]. Ravensbrück: An eyewitness account of a women's concentration camp. Translated by Satterwhite, Gerald (Anchor Books ed.). Garden City, New York: Doubleday Publishing. ISBN 978-0-385-00927-0. OCLC 1256078.
