= Tillon =

Tillon is a French surname. Notable people with the surname include:

- Charles Tillon (1897–1993), French metal worker, trade union leader, politician and French Communist Resistance leader
- Raymonde Tillon (1915–2016), French politician (1945–1951) and a former Communist member of the French Resistance, wife of Charles

== See also ==
- Tillion, people with this name
