= International Movement ATD Fourth World =

ATD Fourth World
- Abbreviation: ATD Fourth World
- Types: non-governmental organization, nonprofit organization
- Legal status: non-profit organisation
- Headquarters: Pierrelaye
- Country: France, Belgium
- Coordinates: 40°43′47″N 73°59′02″W

The International Movement ATD Fourth World is a nonprofit organization working towards the eradication of chronic poverty through a human-rights based approach. It works in partnership with communities across the world to end the exclusion and injustice of persistent poverty, and focuses on learning from and supporting families living in poverty, through grass-roots presence and involvement in disadvantaged communities. Although founded by a priest, Fr. Joseph Wresinski, ATD (All Together in Dignity) Fourth World is an organization with no religious or political affiliations. It runs projects in over 30 countries on five continents, and is in touch with individuals and small non-profits in 146 countries through the Forum for Overcoming Extreme Poverty.

== History ==
ATD Fourth World was founded in 1957 by Joseph Wresinski in a shanty-town of Noisy-le-Grand, near Paris, France.

=== The Founder and Foundations of ATD Fourth World ===
Joseph Wresinski was born to immigrant parents in 1917, in a detainment camp for nationalities considered suspicious during World War I. He grew up living in great poverty and social exclusion. He was ordained as a priest in 1946 and in 1956 he was assigned to be a chaplain to 250 families placed in an emergency housing camp in Noisy-le-Grand, near Paris, France. The families lived in quonset huts erected in a muddy field with just four public spigots providing water for all of them. Joseph Wresinski was opposed to the soup kitchen there, and closed it, stating that "it is not so much food or clothes that these people are in need of, but dignity, and to not have to depend on other people's goodwill". With the parents, he created a kindergarten, a library, then a chapel, a laundry, a workshop, and a beauty parlour. He and the adults created an association that would become ATD Fourth World. Joseph Wresinski used this term as one that evoked the aspirations of creating a new world order, and that held promise and hope for families living in extreme poverty. He wished "to get [people living in poverty] to appear in public, in the places where future is shaped". He stated that he would get "[his] people to climb the steps of the UN, the Elysée and the Vatican".

=== Expansion in France ===
Joseph Wresinski’s firm purpose was to unite all sections of society around people living in chronic poverty. With this aim he met leaders of state, religious groups and international bodies from all over the world. He believed that every man or woman he met represented an opportunity in fighting poverty and he was determined that ATD Fourth World would remain open to people of all cultures, faiths and races. His appointment to France’s Economic and Social Council in 1979 was a significant step in his quest for official representation of people in extreme poverty. With France's publication of the Wresinski Report in 1987, he succeeded in gaining recognition of people in poverty as partners in society, and further, on gaining acknowledgment that poverty is a violation of human rights. It paved the way for the creation of the RMI (revenu minimum d'insertion, a French type of social welfare aimed at people of working age who have not worked sufficient hours to enjoy contributions-based unemployment benefits), and for a law designing a framework for fighting social exclusion that was adopted by France in July 1998.

=== International Growth ===
ATD Fourth World has teams or active members in Belgium, Bolivia, Bulgaria, Burkina Faso, Canada, the Central African Republic, the Democratic Republic of the Congo, the Dominican Republic, El Salvador, France and Reunion Island, Germany, Guatemala, Haiti, Honduras, Ireland, Italy, the Ivory Coast, Lebanon, Luxemburg, Madagascar, Mali, Mauritius, Mexico, the Netherlands, Peru, the Philippines, Poland, Portugal, Senegal, Spain, Switzerland, Tanzania, Thailand, the United Kingdom, and the United States of America. The International Movement ATD Fourth World strives for the voice of people living in the worst forms of poverty to be heard at the heart of international institutions, in order that their viewpoint and aspirations help to shape international policy. It holds general consultative status at the United Nations, UNICEF, UNESCO, the ILO and participatory status at the Council of Europe. This gives greater weight to its work in the human rights field and other essential issues in the fight against chronic poverty. It also maintains a permanent delegation to the European Union.

=== International Day for the Eradication of Poverty ===
On 17 October 1987, in the presence of 100,000 people from every social background and continent, Joseph Wresinski unveiled a commemorative stone at the Trocadero Human Rights Plaza in Paris. On this marble stone, his call is engraved: "Wherever men and women are condemned to live in poverty, human rights are violated. To come together to ensure that these rights be respected is our solemn duty." The United Nations declared 17 October to be "International Day for the Eradication of Poverty" in 1992. Since then, more than thirty similar Commemorative Stones have been laid around the world, from Manega, Burkina Faso, to the European Parliament in Brussels, and from Rizal Park in the Philippines to the gardens of the United Nations in New York. Each one bears that same text. In many countries, each 17 October, people gather for a commemoration in honour of all those who suffer from extreme poverty, and to renew their commitment to fighting poverty.

== Principles of the Organization ==
=== The fight to eradicate poverty - a human rights approach ===
Rather than distributing emergency aid, ATD Fourth World seeks to create sustainable cultural projects designed together with people living in great poverty. It attempts to change the way society sees people living in poverty and social exclusion. "We are not here to manage poverty, but to destroy it", said Joseph Wresinski.

=== Priority given to people living in the most extreme situations of poverty ===
ATD Fourth World works with individuals, families and groups struggling with poverty, in urban and rural areas. It breaks with traditional top-down ways of dealing with chronic poverty, by enabling those with first-hand experience of poverty and exclusion to meet policy makers, researchers and others on equal ground to pool their expertise in the struggle against poverty.

== Activities ==
=== To promote access to culture and education ===
The Organization creates projects aimed at stimulating access to knowledge, culture and education for all. Activities aim to show that every person can learn, that everyone has some knowledge to share and some skill to use. One such activity that takes place throughout the world is the Street Library: volunteers go with books to places where children and their families live in conditions of extreme poverty. Through reading, crafts and theatre activities, relationships are built with children and their families and links are created with the society from which the families have been marginalised. During a trip to India in 1965, Joseph Wresinski met a group of children who lived by themselves in Bombay train station. The children shared between themselves any leftovers they found on the trains. They were called "Tapoori." In 1967 a children’s network was created within the Fourth World movement in solidarity with the children of the emergency housing camp of Noisy-le-Grand, in France. The Tapori network is a worldwide network of children whose motto is, "We want all children to have the same chances". Through Tapori, children, aged 5 to 12, learn from and about one another through a newsletter and website relating true stories of children’s acts and expressions of friendship, empathy, and fairness. Hands-on activities invite children to create and add their own ideas, actions, and projects for a world without poverty.

=== To promote and support the right to live as a family, decent work and social well-being ===
ATD Fourth World is involved in projects to protect the right of parents to raise their own children, setting up for example a Live-In Family Development Programme in Noisy-le-Grand. Family holiday homes have also been created – in Frimhurst for example, in the United Kingdom – which are places where families living in chronic poverty can go in order to take a break from their daily struggles. ATD Fourth World also organises projects aimed at improving disadvantaged communities' access to decent work and social well-being, such as in Madagascar for example or in the United States, with the Learning Co-op, which promotes the free exchange of knowledge and skills within isolated communities.

=== Awareness-raising ===
As well as having a permanent delegation at the European Union and holding general consultative status with UNICEF, UNESCO, ECOSOC, the International Labour Organization and participatory status at the Council of Europe, ATD Fourth World takes part in public debates and conferences to change the way society thinks about poverty and to invite individuals and institutions to unite in creating a world without poverty. At the Council of Europe's INGO Conference, the International Movement ATD Fourth World is currently chairing the Human Rights Committee (until 2014), working on the protection of human rights defenders, media and human rights, religion and human rights, children and human rights, the European Social Charter, and economic, social and cultural rights. The NGO is also involved in the UN Draft guiding principles (DGPs) on extreme poverty and human rights, which addresses the issue of extreme poverty within the human rights framework.

=== Research ===
ATD Fourth World created a Research and Training Institute in 1960 with the aim of building knowledge, research and training in all areas affecting the lives of people living in extreme poverty, taking into account their personal knowledge and experiences as well as the contributions made by practitioners and academics. The Joseph Wresinski Archives and Research Centre (JWC) aims to assemble, protect and promote the stories and histories of people living in chronic poverty, through all types of medium (written, audio, video, film, photo, objects). The JWC thus serves to "reinforce the collective identity of people living in poverty" as well as an important tool for researchers investigating poverty and issues that interlink with poverty. As one researcher put it, "The issue of poverty is the subject of many reports, analysis, debate and resolutions. However, the experiences of those living in poverty are often not reflected in high level policy documents or economic reports. For UN staff, poverty and development experts, government representatives, and NGOs, the use of an expert language grounded in statistics has become the prevailing way to discuss poverty. In contrast, a reduction in the percentage of people living within the World Bank definition of extreme poverty has little impact upon those for whom poverty persists. What is unseen to most experts in the field of poverty is the story of real people – the mother who goes to the rubbish dump every day to work so her children can go to school; the father who walks the streets looking for work so he can bring home food to his family; the woman who refuses to be re-housed out of her cemetery home because she cannot bear to have a better life while others are left behind". In 2011 the ATD Fourth World sourced proposal paper Extreme Poverty and World Governance was published by the Forum for the new World Governance. The aim of the report is to place the eradication of extreme poverty at the heart of the political goals pursued by a renewed world governance, and to recognize the participation of the poorest members of humanity in elaborating new principles or shaping future world governance as an essential condition in the success of the enterprise.

== See also ==
- Extreme poverty
- Poverty
- Poverty in France
- Revenu minimum d'insertion
- Joseph Wresinski
- Human rights
- The Despouy Report on Human Rights and Extreme Poverty at Wikisource
