= Joseph Wresinski =

French priest and humanitarian activist

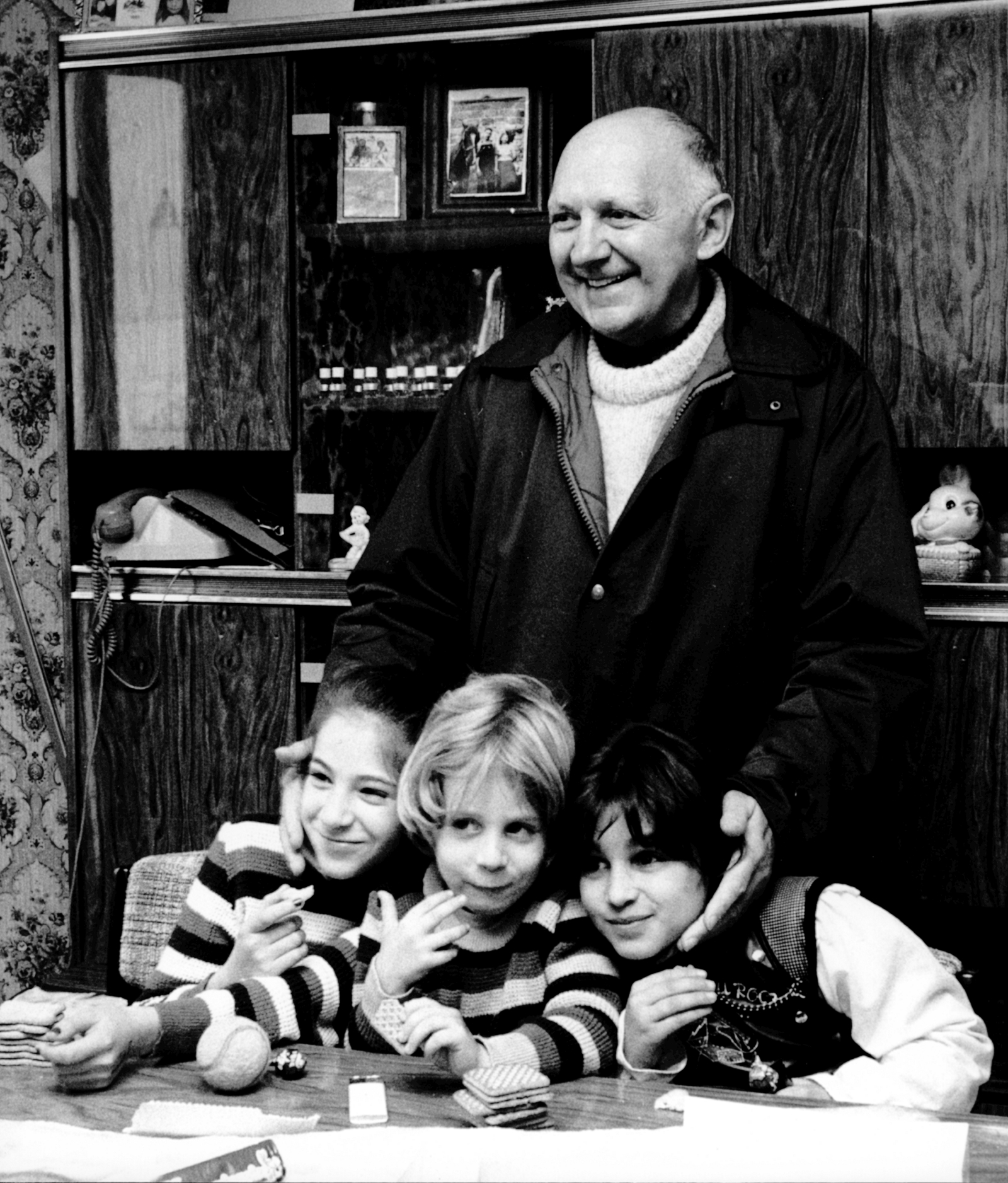
Joseph Wresinski

Joseph Wresinski (12 February 1917 – 14 February 1988) was a French priest and humanitarian activist who was born in Angers and died in Suresnes.

== Biography ==
Born to immigrant parents, Wresinski grew up in poverty and experienced social exclusion. He established major landmarks throughout his life in the fight against the worst forms of poverty, in collaboration with the very poor themselves and other partners. He also developed a blueprint for a civilisation without exclusion based on his work in the field of human activity, a civilisation with the contributions of all people, and for the benefit of all.

Wresinski was ordained as a Catholic priest in 1946. Consequently, in 1956, he was assigned by his bishop to be chaplain for 250 families placed in emergency housing in Noisy-le-Grand. A year later, in response to this, he founded the International Movement ATD Fourth World in 1957. He authored the report Grande pauvreté et précarité économique et sociale (Chronic Poverty and Lack of Basic Security), which was commissioned by the French Economic and Social Council, and later adopted by this council, of which he was a member. This report paved the way for substantial work undertaken by the United Nations Commission on Human Rights, the European Union, and the Council of Europe. It also paved the way for the law against social exclusion that was adopted by France in July 1998.

In 1987, Fr. Wresinski launched the International Day for the Eradication of Poverty (17 October), later recognised by the United Nations General Assembly.
