= De Gaulle (2020 film) =

- Directed by: Gabriel Le Bomin
- Screenplay by: Gabriel Le Bomin; Valérie Ranson-Enguiale
- Produced by: Aïssa Djabri; Farid Lahouassa
- Starring: Lambert Wilson; Isabelle Carré
- Cinematography: Jean-Marie Dreujou
- Edited by: Bertrand Collard
- Music by: Romain Trouillet
- Distributed by: Samuel Goldwyn Films
- Release date: 2020
- Running time: 108 minutes
- Country: France
- Language: French
- Budget: $11.8 million
- Box office: $8.1 million

De Gaulle is a 2020 French biographical historical drama film written and directed by Gabriel Le Bomin, starring Lambert Wilson and Isabelle Carré as Charles and Yvonne de Gaulle.

== Plot ==
Paris, June 1940. The country is facing military and political collapse as the Battle of France rages. A married couple, Charles de Gaulle and his wife Yvonne, are trying to cope with the situation at hand. When de Gaulle goes to war as a brigadier general in the battle against the invading German army, his wife Yvonne remains at home and takes care of their three children: Elisabeth, Philippe and little Anne.

As the Germans activate Fall Rot, Paul Reynaud appoints de Gaulle as Defence Minister, under the command of Deputy Prime Minister Philippe Pétain, who was responsible for collaboration with the British. While attending a cabinet meeting, de Gaulle is not met kindly by Pétain, General Maxime Weygand and Geoffroy Chodron de Courcel, who all feel that de Gaulle is not fit for office.

Following his visit to Weygand, who was aiming for a truce between French and the Germans, de Gaulle decides to fly to Britain to meet the British Prime Minister Winston Churchill to discuss the evacuation of the French army to French North Africa. It's only after that trip that Reynaud, Pétain, and Weygand change their view about de Gaulle. During the same month, de Gaulle attends a couple of Anglo-French Supreme War Council meetings where he meets Churchill and General Edward Spears on 11 June, and two days later meets the Earl of Halifax.

Following the successful meetings, de Gaulle offers his resignation, but the Interior Minister Georges Mandel urges him to stay. An escape from French North Africa with Edward Spears and Jean Laurent makes the German government suspicious and an arrest warrant is issued in de Gaulle's name. De Gaulle ends up landing in Britain and goes directly to Churchill, who suggests he should work for BBC Radio on 17 June. The next day, de Gaulle issues an appeal to the French people not to be demoralized and to continue fighting against the German aggressors.

It was during this time that Yvonne and her children left Colombey-les-Deux-Églises, as German forces continue to advance throughout France. By 25 June 1940, de Gaulle becomes the leader of the Free France and eventually becomes the President of the Republic.

== Cast ==
- Lambert Wilson as Charles de Gaulle
- Isabelle Carré as Yvonne de Gaulle
- Olivier Gourmet as Paul Reynaud
- Catherine Mouchet as Marguerite Potel
- Pierre Hancisse as Geoffroy Chodron de Courcel
- Sophie Quinton as Suzanne Rerolle
- Gilles Cohen as Georges Mandel
- Laurent Stocker as Jean Laurent
- Alain Lenglet as General Maxime Weygand
- Philippine Leroy-Beaulieu as Hélène de Portes
- Tim Hudson as Winston Churchill
- Nicolas Vaude as Paul Baudouin
- Philippe Laudenbach as Deputy Prime Minister Philippe Pétain
- Clémence Hittin as Anne de Gaulle
- Félix Back as Philippe de Gaulle
- Lucie Rouxel as Elisabeth de Gaulle
- Victor Belmondo as Claude Hettier de Boislambert
- Stanislas Hittin as Jacques-Henri Rerolle
- Amicie Hittin as Marguerite Rerolle
- Andrew Bicknell as Edward Spears
- Ross Donnelly as German soldier
- Évelyne Buyle as The aunt
- Frédéric Épaud
- Marilou Aussilloux as Elisabeth de Miribel
- Kester Lovelace as barman
- Conor Lovett as Earl of Halifax
- Jean-Noël Martin as a Frenchman in London
- Derek Simon Robin as minister
- Nicolas Robin as Alex Surchamp
- Chris Zastera
- Sam Huntley-Poole as delivery boy
- Erik Martens as German soldier (uncredited)
- Franck Viltart as man in the barracks

== Reception ==
On review aggregator website Rotten Tomatoes, the film has an approval rating of 40% based on 10 critics, with an average rating of 6.3/10.

Sandra Hall of The Sydney Morning Herald wrote "Wilson makes a very plausible de Gaulle. He has the height, the slimness and the posture and once he has the uniform on, it's easy to overlook the fact that he's much too handsome for the part".

Jordan Mintzer of The Hollywood Reporter called the film "A bland piece of hero worship".

== See also ==
- De Gaulle, 2026 film
