= Germaine Deschanel =

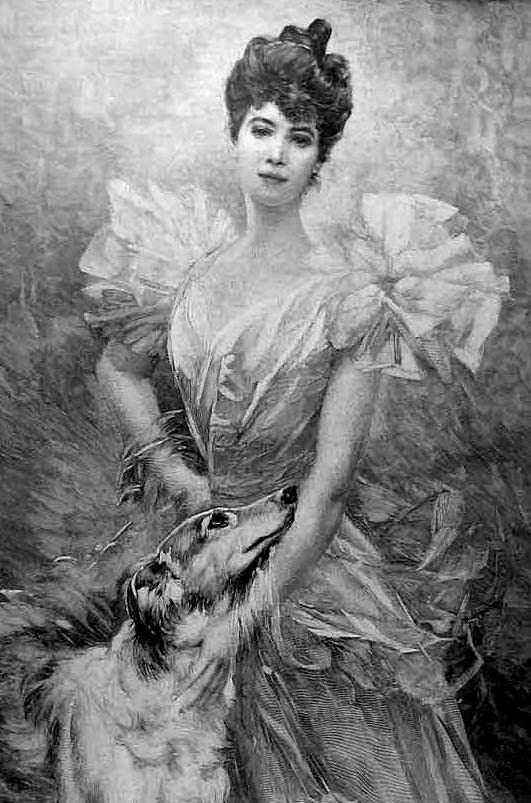

Spouse of the President of France
- In office 18 February 1920 – 21 September 1920
- President: Paul Deschanel
- Preceded by: Henriette Poincaré
- Succeeded by: Jeanne Millerand

Personal details
- Born: Camille Armande Marie Germaine Brice de Vièle; September 13, 1876 Montigny, Vezin-le-Coquet, Ille-et-Vilaine, France
- Died: July 8, 1959 (aged 82) Neuilly-sur-Seine, Seine-et-Oise, France
- Children: 3
- Parent(s): René Joseph Brice de Vièle (1839-1921); Louise Antoinette Doucet

Germaine Deschanel (born Germaine Brice de Vièle: 13 September 1876 - 8 July 1959) was the well-born wife of Paul Deschanel, the French statesman-academician who served as President of France from 18 February to 21 September 1920.

== Biography ==
=== Provenance and early years ===
Camille Armande Marie Germaine Brice de Vièle was born at two in the morning in Montigny (Vezin-le-Coquet), a short distance to the west of Rennes, into which it has for most purposes subsequently been subsumed. Rennes was and is the principal commercial and political centre of Upper Brittany. It was here that she grew up. Her father was René Joseph Brice de Vièle (1839-1921), a lawyer who had been prominent locally as an outspoken opponent of the "Second Empire" regime. The return of republican government in 1870 found him in sympathy with the political mainstream. He represented the department as a "Moderate Republican" ("Républicain modéré") deputy ("member of parliament") in the National Assembly between 1871 and 1889, and again between 1893 and 1921. He combined his parliamentary duties with senior directorial postings, principally in the banking and finance sector. As the only grand-child to the dramatist-academician Camille Doucet (1812-1899), Germaine Brice was also heiress to talent and privilege through her mother, born Louise Antoinette Doucet.

=== Marriage ===
On 13 February 1901 Germaine Brice de Vièle married the President of the Chamber of Deputies, Paul Deschanel, a leading member of the Democratic Republican Alliance (party), noted for the impact of his oratory. The church ceremony was conducted in the Saint-Germain-des-Prés in the left bank 6th arrondissement of Paris. Conducted on Paul Deschanel, the ceremony was a grand affair. More than 10,000 invitations were sent out, and President Loubet and Ernest Legouvé, by this time respected as a "grand old man" of the Académie Française, were the witnesses. Germaine Deschanel was younger than her husband by more than 21 years.

The marriage was followed by the births of the couple's three children:

- Renée Antoinette Deschanel (1902-1977) married Henry Waldmann in 1923 and, following divorce, married Charles-Claude Duval in 1930. Through this second marriage Germaine Deschanel later became a grandmother.
- Jean Deschanel (1904–1963), senior government official and politician, married but childless.
- Louis-Paul Deschanel (1909-1939), historian

=== Wife of the President of the Republic ===
Having long before taken to the life of a society hostess, Germaine Deschanel made the easy transfer to the Élysée Palace with her husband following his election to the presidency in January 1920. The three children came too. She was nevertheless considered reassuringly discrete and reserved by the political class, evidently hardly ever engaging in public affairs, but preferring to focus on her role as the presidential hostess. It was reported that she conquered with her charm all who approached her.

President Paul Deschanel's massive margin of victory in the presidential election of 17 January 1920 was almost without precedent. (Note: 868 of the 888 members of parliament entitled to vote in the presidential election did so. 734 of the 868 (84.5%) voted for Paul Deschanel.) Behind the scenes all was not well, however. At 23.15 on 23 May 1920, travelling on the presidential train to Montbrison, where he was scheduled to unveil a statue to a war hero the next day, the president felt short of breath. He got out of bed, went to the carriage window which he opened wide, leaned out and fell through it. The train had reached a section of track that was being repaired, and was therefore travelling at only around 50 km/h (30 mph): Deschanel was shaken by the fall, but his physical injuries were only superficial. André Radeau, the railway worker responsible for the stretch of track beside which he had landed, viewed with scepticism the assertion of this elderly confused gentleman in pyjamas that he was the President of France. Assuming that he had found a lost drunkard who had strayed from the usual path home, Radeau took the man to the home nearby of Gustave Dariot, the level-crossing keeper, who was impressed by Deschanel's dignified bearing and the coherence of his explanations: the president was put lie down in order that he might, during what remained of the night, recover from his ordeal. The wife of the level crossing keeper could see that their guest was no run-of-the-mill lost soul. The pyjamas the old man wore were of good quality and, as she later explained to journalists, "I could see that he was a proper gentleman: he had clean feet!" Early next morning train staff noticed that the president was missing. A presidential reception committee headed up by Interior Minister Théodore Steeg endured a long wait without news on the platform at Roanne station. Eventually a message arrived from the local sub-prefect at Montargis, close to where the president's mishap had taken place, explaining in outline what had happened. A few hours later it was the president himself who telephoned the Élysée Palace with the necessary reassurances. Two days after that, Paul Deschanel presided in person at a cabinet meeting. The government issued a statement seeking to play down the incident. Nevertheless, the story proved irresistible: press coverage was extensive. Printed cartoons and hastily adapted popular songs in the music halls were far from respectful.

Despite official attempts to present a "business as usual" picture, the fall from the train window was not the first instance of unconventional behaviour by the president since his election. Deschanel and those close to him recognised that he was suffering from an acute combination of insomnia, exhaustion and depression, and he was keen to resign the presidency at once, in order to be able to take a "complete rest". (It emerged only in 1948 that doctors had diagnosed his condition as Elpénor Syndrome.) The president nevertheless allowed himself to be persuaded by Prime Minister Millerand that "a few months of calm" over the summer would be sufficient to restore political normality. At the end of May the Deschanel family quietly moved their base to Castle Monteillerie, a manor house owned by their friend, the widow Laure Brouardel, located between Lisieux and Pont-l’Evêque. This was far more accessible to Paris than the couple's Brittany home, but nevertheless more restful than the Élysée Palace. In July 1920 the presidential family moved again, this time to the Château de Rambouillet, the "presidential summer residence" on the south side of Paris. On 10 September 1920 Paul Deschanel made his way downstairs before breakfast and went out into the park surrounding the Château, where he briefly engaged a park worker in a conversation which seems to have been unremarkable, except that the president was still in a state of semi-undress. He then stepped into the water basin surrounding an ornamental fountain, which he appeared to have mistaken for a bath tub. After he had been led back to his bed he woke up properly, with absolutely no recollection of his early-morning walk in the park. Paul Deschanel finally resigned the presidency on 21 September 1920 due to the "state of his health" which no linger "permitted him to undertake the high functions" to which he had been elected. While the family appear to have been permitted to live Rambouillet till the end of the year, the ex-president himself was taken to a Paris sanatorium at Rueil-Malmaison where his condition rapidly improved. According to one horrified historian, Germaine Deschanel told friends later that the ex-president's hospitalisation had left her treated as "an employee", she was forced to carry her own suitcases through the rain when vacating the Élysée Palace. On 9 January 1921 Paul; Deschanel was elected to membership of the senate. A full return to robust good health eluded him, however. In April 1922, following an Influenza attack, he suffered a relapse after leaving the house contrary to medical advice before being sufficiently recovered. Forced by his condition to return to his bed, suffering from a pulmonary abscess and pleural empyema, Paul Deschanel was now looked after by two doctors who were unable to save his life. He died aged 67 on 28 April 1922.

Germaine Deschanel was 45 when her husband died. Her widowhood lasted 37 years, during which she lived a private life. The media ridicule which she had briefly endured in consequence with her husband's mental illness was replaced with public oblivion. She resurfaced briefly on 24 October 1926, when she was photographed with her three children and her recently acquired son-in-law arriving in Nogent-le-Rotrou, arriving for the unveiling of a statue celebrating her late husband. Germaine Deschanel never remarried, and turned down all offers of a government pension. She died at Neuilly-sur-Seine on 8 July 1959.

Her body was buried alongside the mortal remains of her husband and their younger son (who had been killed early in the war) in the family vault at Montparnasse.
