= Anne de Gaulle =

Daughter of Charles de Gaulle (1928-1948)

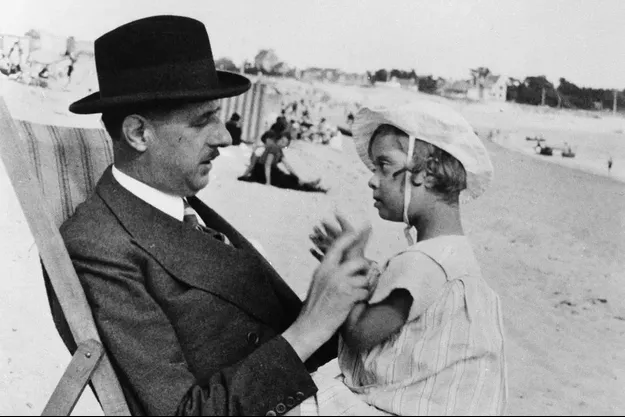
- Anne and her father Charles in 1933
- Born: 1 January 1928; Trier, Germany
- Died: 6 February 1948 (aged 20); Colombey-les-Deux-Églises, France
- Resting place: Colombey-les-Deux-Eglises Parish Churchyard
- Known for: La Fondation Anne de Gaulle
- Parent(s): Charles de Gaulle; Yvonne de Gaulle
- Relatives: Philippe de Gaulle (brother)
- Website: https://fondation-anne-de-gaulle.org/

Anne de Gaulle (1 January 1928 – 6 February 1948) was the youngest daughter of General Charles de Gaulle and his wife, Yvonne. She was born in Trier, Germany, where her father was stationed with the Army of Occupation in the Rhineland.

She was born with Down syndrome and lived with her family until her death. General de Gaulle, who was normally undemonstrative and stoic in his affections for his family, was more open and extroverted with Anne. De Gaulle would entertain her with songs, dances, and pantomimes. She could only say one word clearly: "Papa".

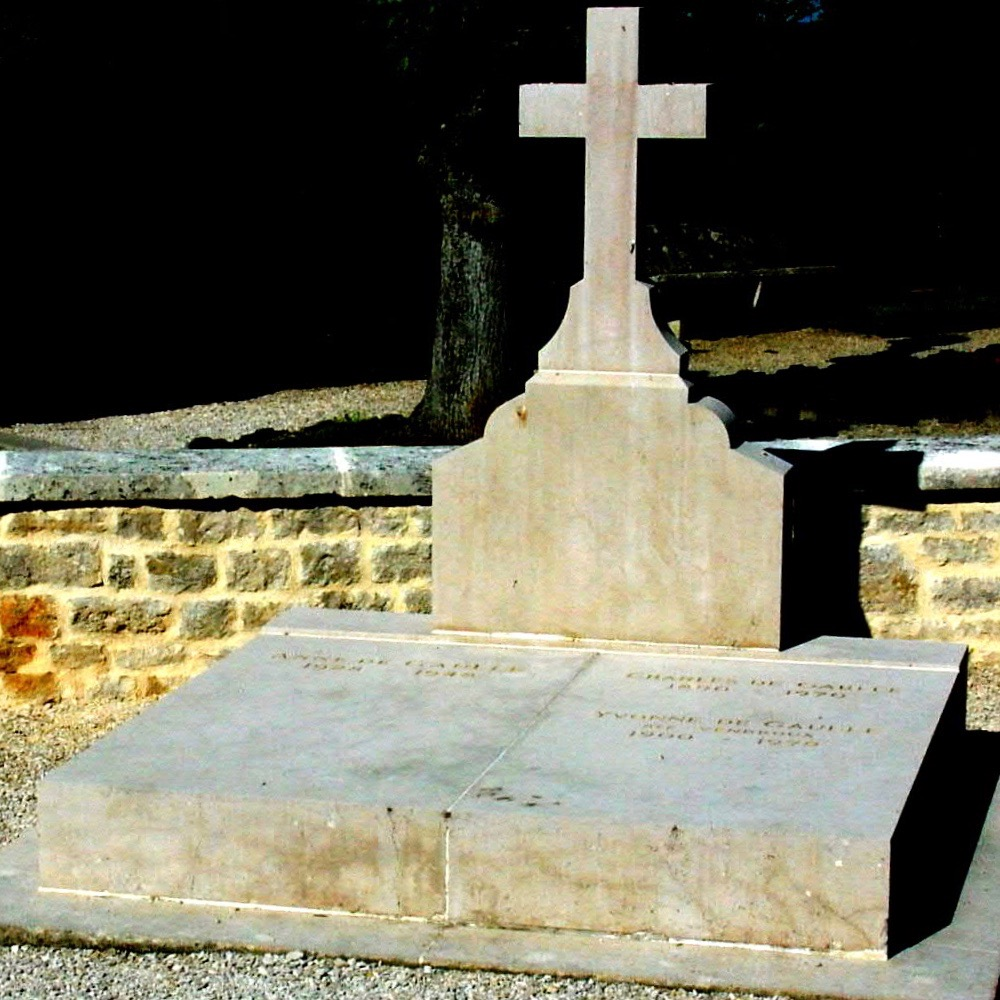
The grave of Anne beside her parents

In October 1945, Yvonne de Gaulle bought the Château de Vert-Cœur at Milon-la-Chapelle (Yvelines), where they installed a private hospital for disabled young girls: the Fondation Anne de Gaulle ('Anne de Gaulle Foundation').

Anne died on 6 February 1948 after catching bronchitis, aged 20, at Colombey-les-Deux-Églises. Upon her death, her father said: "Now, she is like the others" ("Maintenant, elle est comme les autres").

On 22 August 1962, Charles de Gaulle was the victim of an attempted assassination at Petit-Clamart. He later said that the potentially fatal bullet had been stopped by the frame of the photograph of Anne that he always carried with him; placed this particular day on the rear shelf of his car. When he died in 1970, he was buried in the cemetery of Colombey-les-Deux-Églises beside his beloved daughter.

She is portrayed by Clémence Hittin in the 2020 film De Gaulle. From 3 to 10 December 2022, Paris Charles de Gaulle Airport was named Paris-Anne de Gaulle. The occasion was the International Day of Persons with Disabilities.
