= Germaine Coty =

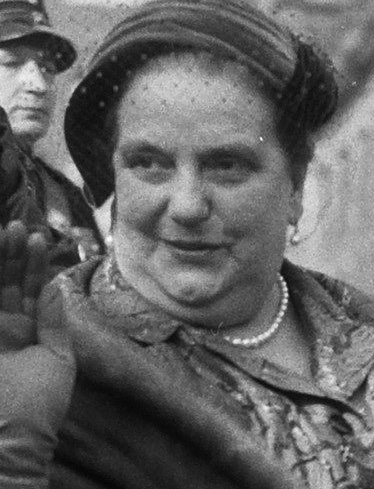
- Coty in 1954

Spouse of the President of France
- In office 16 January 1954 – 12 November 1955
- President: René Coty
- Preceded by: Michelle Auriol
- Succeeded by: Yvonne de Gaulle (1959)

Personal details
- Born: Germaine Alice Corblet; 9 April 1887 Le Havre, Seine-Inférieure, France
- Died: 12 November 1955 (aged 68) Château de Rambouillet, Seine-et-Oise, France
- Spouse: René Coty (m. 1905)
- Children: 2

Germaine Alice Coty (French pronunciation: [ʒɛʁmɛn kɔti]; née Corblet; 9 April 1887 – 12 November 1955) was the daughter of a Normandy ship owner who became the wife of the French lawyer-politician René Coty. When she died, slightly less than 22 months after her husband became president of France, she became the first wife of a French president to die while her husband was still in office. By that time she had become popular with the French public "for her simplicity and kindness: hostile commentators who had mocked her when she moved into the presidential "Élysée Palace" quickly ceased their mockery in response to vehement public protests". (Note: "Germaine Coty séduit immédiatement les Français par sa simplicité et sa gentillesse.. Les chansonniers qui la raillent font vite taire leurs moqueries en raison des protestations véhémentes du public".)

== Biography ==
=== Provenance and childhood ===
Germaine Corblet was born in Le Havre, a major port city in northern France, located at the mouth of the Seine. She was the second-born of her parents' three recorded children, and the eldest daughter of Edouard Corblet (1847–1913) by his marriage in 1875 to Marie Jeanne Clotilde Belhomme. Edouard Corblet was a ship owner and, in 1896, the co-founder with a sea captain called Cicero Brown of the company "Brown & Corblet", a business created to specialise in the potentially lucrative business of shipping nickel from New Caledonia to Europe. Much of Germaine's education was provided by church institutions, first in France and later in England: she would remain a practicing Catholic throughout her life. Because of the time she spent at a convent school across the sea to the north, in Southampton, she also became fluent in the English language.

=== Marriage and family ===
By the time she met the young lawyer-notary René Coty early in 1905 for she already knew both Nelly and Marthe, his two elder sisters. The engagement was short. On 21 May 1905, Germaine Coty married René Coty. The marriage was solemnised at St Michael's Church (subsequently destroyed and replaced with a modern structure) in Le Havre. (Note: Marriages in France must be effected by means of a civil ceremony at a town hall in order to be accepted by the government and its agencies as legally constituted; but it is open to the parties to follow through with a church ceremony. Many couples do that.) Later that year her new husband launched himself on a political career, elected as a local councillor, and identifying himself on the ballot paper as a "radical and radical-socialist" candidate. It is not clear why the election was subsequently formally invalidated, but the next year he stood for election again and was re-elected: René Coty continued to be listed as a local councillor between 1908 and 1919.

The couple's marriage was followed by the births of their two daughters in 1907 and 1909. The daughters married in 1929 and 1932, and Germaine Coty very soon became a multiple hands-on grandmother, a role which she greatly relished for the rest of her life. The younger of the two daughters, Anne-Marie (1909–1987), married the otorhinolaryngologist turned politician Maurice Georges, who in 1974 was among those who signed the so-called "Call of the 43 [politicians]", urging Valéry Giscard d'Estaing to stand for the presidency in that year's presidential election (though he subsequently left the "group of 43" following a disagreement).

=== Middle years ===
The Cotys were separated during the First World War after René Coty volunteered for military service. He served with the 129th Infantry Regiment (which had its home base at Le Havre); and fought at Verdun. The letters that the couple exchanged during this period indicate that their partnership was a close one and that Germaine Coty handled the separation and associated worry with her customary quiet strength.

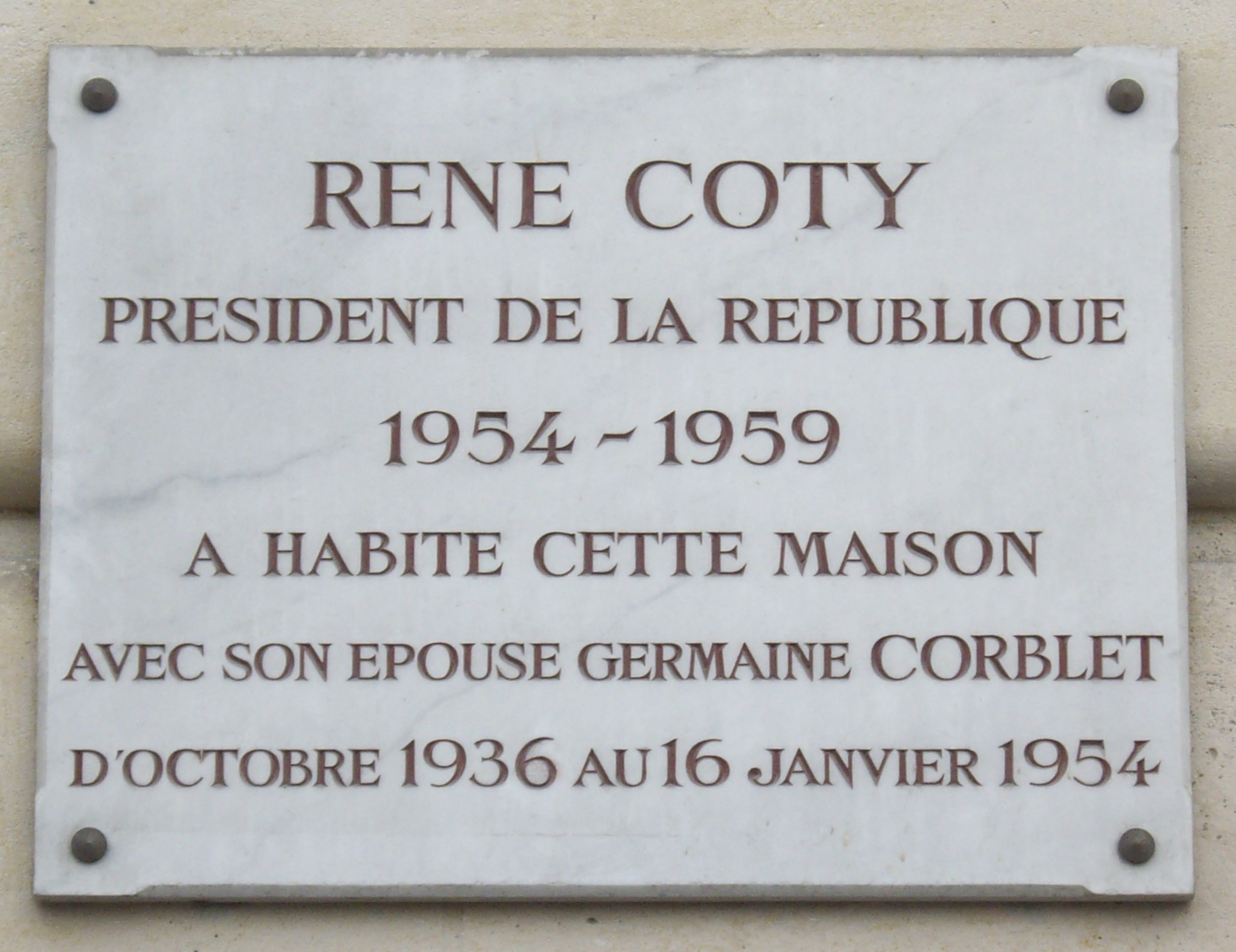
A plaque on an outside wall identifies the Paris apartment building in which René and Germaine Coty lived between October 1936 and January 1954.

After the war René Coty resumed his legal work. He had been a member of the bar at Le Havre, specialising in maritime and commercial law. The quality of his advocacy and court-room oratory meant he was on occasion called upon to appear in other cases, both civil and criminal. However, his political work became increasingly time-consuming, and in 1932 he was obliged to terminate his court room work. In May 1923 he moved on from local to national politics, elected to membership of the Chamber of Deputies (lower house) of the French Parliament in a bye-election triggered by the deaths of Jules Siegfried and Pierre de Bagneux. For electoral purposes he described himself as a member of the Democratic Union ("Union démocratique"), referencing a centrist nineteenth century political grouping. René Coty continued to sit as a member of the Chamber of Deputies without a break till 1936 without ever pinning his colours very clearly to any of the main political parties. At the end of 1935 he was elected to membership of the senate. Throughout this period he was supported, in the background, with unceasing fortitude and unquestioning devotion by Germaine, who ran the family and the household with shrewd efficiency, leaving her husband to focus on his career. In the context of the times the arrangement was evidently one that suited them both very well.

=== First Lady ===
The 1953 presidential election, conducted between 17 and 23 December, by a combined electorate comprising all the members from both houses of parliament, was a convoluted affair which, some believed, brought the French Fourth Republic into disrepute: René Coty's victory and came only at the thirteenth ballot, after the other candidates had been eliminated one by one, round by round. René Coty's emergence as the winner of the last men standing came as a surprise to colleagues and commentators alike. Germaine Coty was informed of it by a news reporter who had found his way to the front door of her apartment in the 4th arrondissement of Paris, which René and Germaine Coty had shared since relocating from Normandy in 1936. The reporter rang the bell, hoping for a reaction from the wife of the new president. He was not disappointed. Germaine Coty had been in the kitchen and had not bothered to remove her apron before opening the door to the unexpected visitor. Her reaction was direct: "I'll make him a tart". (Note: "Je vais lui faire une tarte.")

The populist press reacted to the appearance of a new wife of the president with astonishment. Michelle Auriol, her predecessor in the role, dressed extravagantly and cultivated a sophisticated elegance. The contrast with Germaine Coty, a comfortably corpulent woman who did not baulk at the simple chores associated with keeping house, and who was perfectly happy to wear an apron when welcoming journalists who had come to meet the wife of the new head of state, could hardly have been more complete. Although some commentators have inferred an element of contrivance in the public face presented by Germaine Coty, most sources accept that she was totally genuine, without either the inclination or the ability to create any sort of "alternative version of herself for public consumption". In 1954 a second version of "Nouveaux Portraits" appeared in which the respected writer-politician Françoise Giroud stressed what she saw as the natural humility of Germaine Coty: "Immediately after [reading in newspapers the result of the presidential election] she was both shocked and suddenly saddened: Look at me ... I do not pretend to be thin, but in the end, all the same ...". (Note: «Regardez-moi ... je ne prétends pas être mince, mais enfin tout de même ...») She is also quoted at around the same time sharing her shock accompanied by the insight, "I'm no pin-up: I'm a grandmother!". (Note: «... je ne suis pas une pin-up, je suis une grand-mère.») During the early months of 1954 a number of the soubriquets she attracted in print and on the streets were brutal: "Madame without the corset", "Christmas log", "Madame plenty"

Germaine Coty quickly became very popular with the wider public, however, and the public criticism targeting her perceived vulnerabilities ceased because of the protests it generated. The French appreciated and empathised with her powerful maternal drive. It became known that she had several rooms in the presidential "Élysée Palace" in order to make it possible to accommodate all ten of her grandchildren. Sources also reference instances of her "child-like simplicity". A particularly frequently repeated anecdote concerns the time she acted as an incognito guide for two American students visiting the Château de Rambouillet. On another occasion her actions were widely reported when she distributed pastries to children in the streets of Vizille, near to what was at that time still an official presidential residence (and one of which President Coty was particularly fond). It became known that Germaine Coty always took particular care to befriend and look after palace staff at "the Élysée". She was also seen to be generous with her time, scheduling five hours each day for her work on different social and welfare projects. It was also noticed that with Germaine Coty running the house, letters addressed to "la dame de l’Élysée" (approximately, "the lady of the palace"), received serious attention and proper replies. Notwithstanding reports of her underlying humility, she acquired a certain beneficent personal authority.

It should be added that Germaine Coty's public image was much enhanced, both during her lifetime and posthumously, by influential sections in the "women's press" and by a campaign in her defence led by Le Pèlerin, the mass-circulation weekly magazine of the Catholic Church in France, even if the perspective offered by the traditionalist catholic magazine is underpinned by attitudes that might invite incredulity or ridicule two generations later: "We [the French] are a people who recommend that wives should stay home, care for their husbands, their children: and yet when [one of these wives] is called by the dice of democracy to the top job [of wife of the president], the press mocks her because she does not look like a fashion model, because her priorities are family-related". (Note: "Nous sommes un peuple qui recommande à ses femmes de rester au foyer, de s'occuper de leur mari, de leurs enfants, et voilà qu'au moment où l'une d'elles est appelée à la situation suprême par le jeu de la démocratie, la presse la ridiculise parce qu'elle ne ressemble pas à un mannequin, parce que son horizon est familial".)

There was no major restoration or redecoration of "the Élysée" on the Cotys' watch. The presidential palace had been thoroughly modernised between 1947 and 1953 under Président and Présidente Auriol. A noteworthy rearrangement to the palace gardens was nevertheless undertaken by the Cotys, and the presidential chapel was dusted down and reopened.

=== Death ===
Germaine Coty suffered a fatal heart attack and died almost at once, shortly before dawn on 12 November 1955. She had been acutely fatigued for two days, and the previous day, during an Armistice Day celebration at the Arc de Triomphe, she had unexpectedly sat down for twenty minutes. Intimates knew that she had already encountered serious "cardiac problems", but for most of the French people and their commentariat the death came as a great shock. It was the first time in the history of the republic that a president's wife had died while the president was in office. René Coty seriously contemplated resignation but then changed his mind, persuaded that he should not wish to unleash another political crisis on the country. The Cotys' grandchildren were more or less grown up, and during the rest of Coty's incumbency his daughters supported him with his presidential duties.

The unexpected death of Germaine Coty was followed by a widespread outburst of public emotion. Writing in "Le Prestige français" in January 1956, Claude Salvy reported that "Madame René Coty received the funerary respect [normally reserved for] a monarch". (Note: "Madame René Coty eut des obsèques de souveraine".) The president stubbornly refused to have the associated costs funded by the state, however. On 14 November 1955 the scheduled business of the National Assembly was deferred in order that the President of the Assembly, Pierre Schneiter, might deliver a eulogy on behalf of the assembly to "a great French woman, with high qualities of heart and mind", before closing the sitting as a mark of mourning. Sensitive to the public mood, which the crowds gathering outside the "Élysée Palace" made impossible to ignore, President Coty agreed to the government's request that a condolence register should be made available, and that an official ceremony should be organised at the Église de la Madeleine in central Paris. Slightly under 22,000 people attended.

The body was then removed to her home town, Le Havre, where it was buried in the "Cimetière Sainte-Marie" (main cemetery). When the time came, the body of her husband would be placed alongside.

== Celebration ==
Numerous elementary schools and pre-schools across France, but especially in Normandy, have been renamed to celebrate the memory of Germaine Coty, along with a number of other public buildings, retirement homes, streets and town squares.

== Notes ==
Unofficial roles
Preceded by Michelle Auriol	Spouse of the President of France; 1954–1955	Vacant Title next held by Yvonne de Gaulle
