= Charles de Gaulle (politician, born 1948) =

French politician (born 1948)

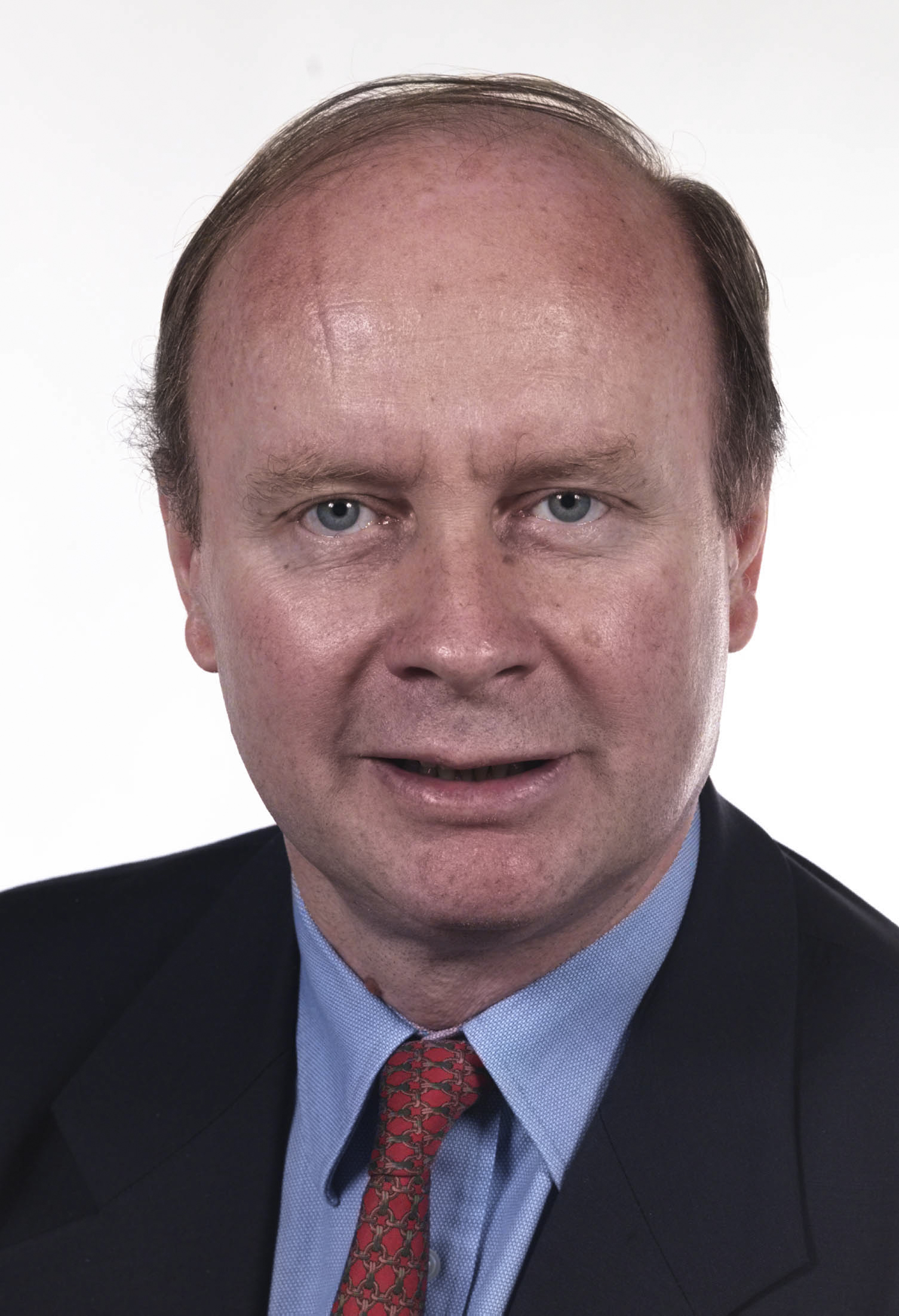
- Official portrait, 1999

Member of the European Parliament for France
- In office 1993–2004

Personal details
- Born: Charles Roger René Jacques de Gaulle; 25 September 1948 (age 78) Dijon, France
- Party: National Rally (since 1999)
- Other political affiliations: Union for French Democracy (until 1994)
- Parent: Philippe de Gaulle (father)
- Relatives: Charles de Gaulle (grandfather)

Charles Roger René Jacques de Gaulle (French: [ʃaʁl(ə) də ɡol]; born 25 September 1948) is a French retired politician. He is the eldest child of Admiral Philippe de Gaulle and a grandson of General and statesman Charles de Gaulle. He served as a member of the European Parliament (MEP) from 1993 to 2004, as a successive member of the Union for French Democracy (until 1994), Movement for France (until 1999) and National Front (until 2004).

== Career ==
Born in Dijon, De Gaulle became a lawyer in Paris in 1971. He was a regional councillor of Nord-Pas-de-Calais from 1986 to 1992, as a member of the Union for French Democracy (UDF) right-of-centre party. From 1989 to 1990, he was the mayor's first deputy in Rueil-Malmaison in the Hauts-de-Seine department. He was present on Valéry Giscard d'Estaing's electoral list at the 1989 European election, and following resignations from UDF members who preceded him, he took his seat in Strasbourg in 1993.

At the 1994 European election, he was elected on Philippe de Villiers's Movement for France (MPF) list. Charles de Gaulle became close to Jean-Marie Le Pen's National Front (FN) in 1998. He refused to vote the suspension of Le Pen's parliamentary immunity in Strasbourg. He joined the FN in 1999, and then ran in the 1999 European election and 2001 Paris municipal election on National Front lists. He did not seek a fourth term at the European Parliament in 2004.
