= Hélène Casimir-Perier =

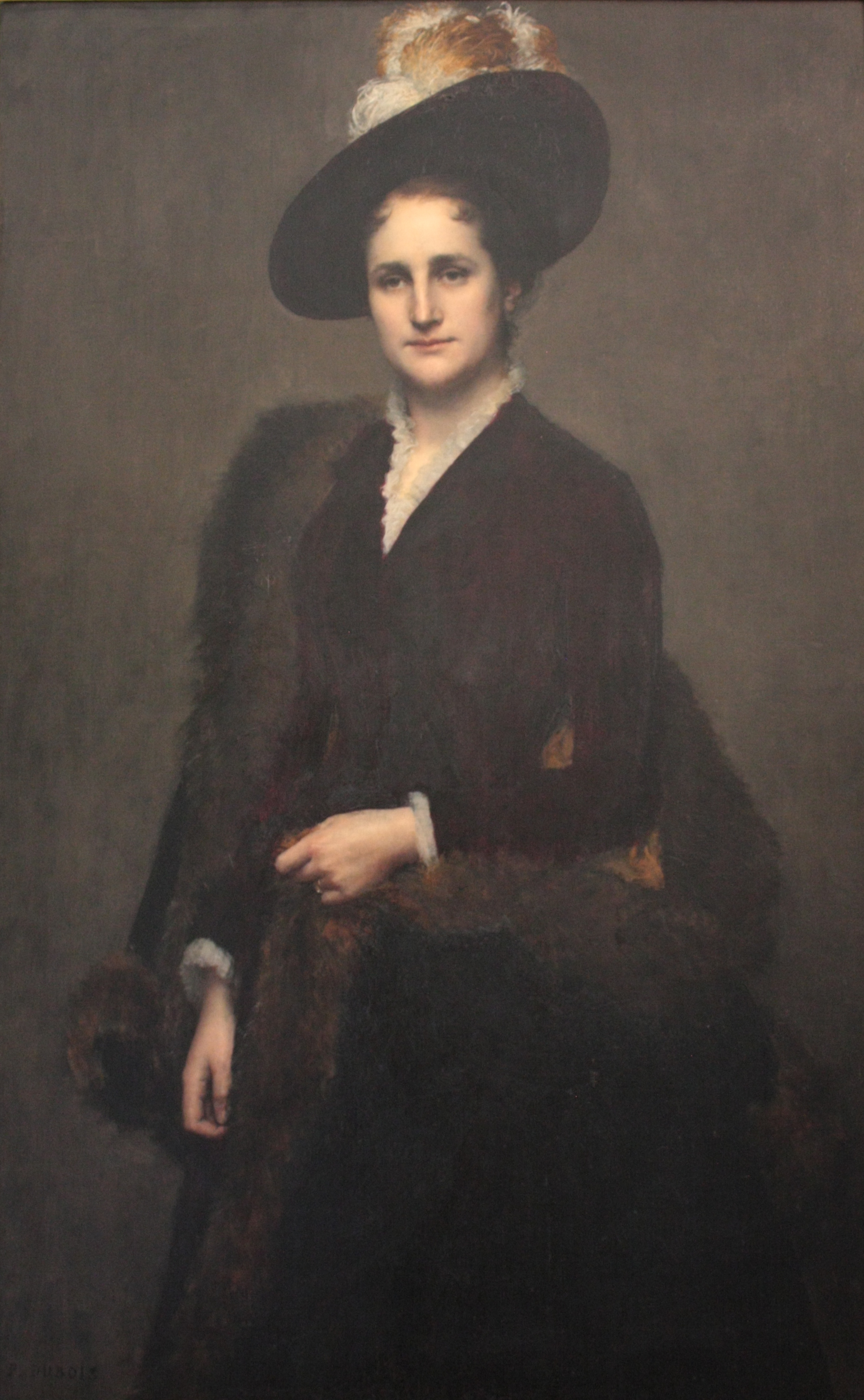
- Hélène Casimir-Perier

Spouse of the President of France
- In role 27 June 1894 – 16 January 1895
- President: Jean Casimir-Perier
- Preceded by: Cécile Carnot
- Succeeded by: Berthe Faure

Personal details
- Born: Hélène Perier-Vitet; September 5, 1854 Groslay, Val-d'Oise, France
- Died: March 3, 1912 (aged 57) Paris, France
- Spouse: Jean Casimir-Perier
- Children: Claude Casimir-Perier; Germaine Casimir-Perier

Hélène Casimir-Perier (1854–1912) was the wife of Jean Casimir-Perier, who was the President of France from 1894 to 1895.

== Biography ==
Hélène Perier-Vitet was born in Grosley-sur-Risle in Val-d'Oise. She married Jean Casimir-Perier, a distant cousin, on 17 April 1873. He was the grandson of Casimir Pierre Périer, president of the Council of Ministers under Louis Philippe I. Her influence on him was strong; she was the driving force behind his run for the presidency.

== Wife of the President of the Republic ==
The presidential couple, Jean and Hélène, and their two children Claude and Germaine, moved into the Élysée Palace from the family home, Château de Vizille, on 27 June 1894. Jean Casimir-Perier resigned just seven months after coming to power, giving him the shortest presidency in the history of the French Republic. His wife did not welcome the news of his resignation. She told him, "If you had consulted me, I would have prevented you from such foolishness!" (French: Si vous m'aviez consultée, je vous aurais empêché de faire une telle sottise!) to which he responded, "That's why I did not tell you." (French: C'est bien pourquoi je ne vous ai rien dit.)

Unofficial roles
Preceded by Cécile Carnot	Spouse of the President of France; 1894–1895	Succeeded by Berthe Faure
