= Coralie Grévy =

French spouse of the president (1811–1893)

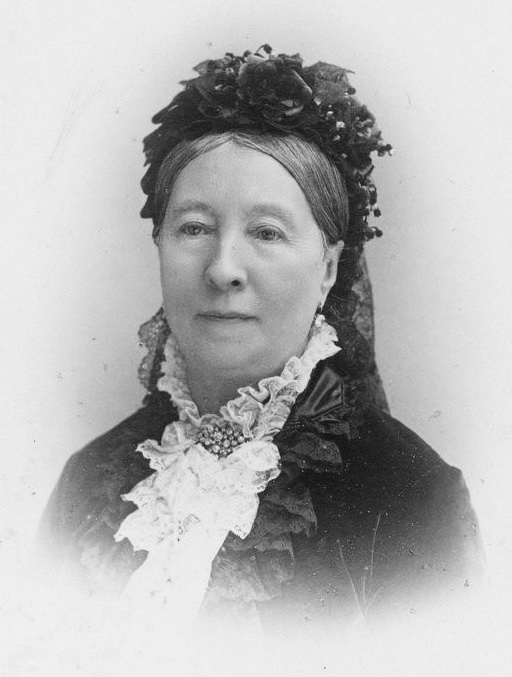
Coralie Grévy

Coralie Grévy (1811–1893) was the wife of President of France Jules Grévy.

She was born Coralie Fraisse in 1811, and was the daughter of a leatherworker in Narbonne.

She married Jules Grévy in 1848, and they had one daughter, Alice. In 1881, Alice married the Deputy President, Daniel Wilson.

Coralie Grévy and her spouse wished to live a simple life and not burden the finances of the state. She agreed to host three balls a year and continue the charity set up by her predecessor, but saw to it that all official events were as inexpensive as possible and benefited the French workforce, such as in the work on the Presidential Palace. In high society, she was mocked and made fun of because of her middle-class background and lack of practice at mixing with the aristocracy, and exposed to social snubs and gossip about her mistakes in this regard.

Unofficial roles
Preceded by Élisabeth de Mac Mahon	Spouse of the President of France; 1879–1887	Succeeded by Cécile Carnot
