= Hélène de Portes =

French woman; lover of Paul Reynaud (1920–1940)

Hélène de Portes (née Rebuffel; 1902 – 28 June 1940) was a Frenchwoman best remembered for the strong influence she exerted on her lover Paul Reynaud, premier of France under the Third Republic, shortly before and at the time France's June 1940 debacle at the hands of Nazi Germany. A Fascist sympathizer, she was described as '..a middle aged woman, with a shrill voice, and a clamorous, demanding manner, who chatted like a magpie and lost her temper with ease.' Charles de Gaulle called her 'a turkey', while Winston Churchill nicknamed her 'the parrot'.

== Life ==
Hélène de Portes was born Hélène Rebuffel in 1902, the daughter of Charles Rebuffel, an engineer and director of Société des Grands Travaux de Marseille from 1917 to 1939. She married Count Henri de Portes, but they separated after she had given him two children. She became Paul Reynaud's mistress in 1930, the year Reynaud entered the cabinet.

=== Reynaud's premiership ===
As Reynaud rose in the 1930s through the upper ranks of his party, the Democratic Republican Alliance, de Portes' status moved upwards with him. She was described by insiders as la porte à côté, the side door through which interested persons could gain access to the state of mind of the highest echelon of the French government.

As the power of Nazi Germany grew, Reynaud was identified by many French voters and deputies as a strong voice of resistance to Germany. He became Minister of Finance in 1938 and on 21 March 1940, after the German occupation of Poland, became Prime Minister of France. As such, he led a government whose status depended on its alliance with the United Kingdom. However, while the French alliance with England was strategic policy from the standpoint of the fight against Hitler, the alliance was obnoxious to the Countess, who has been described as "so violently anti-British that Hitler had once sent an emissary to woo her favours."

Reynaud's ability to lead his government against the Axis was compromised by his partner, who was on terms of friendship with the ambassadors from Mussolini's Italy and Hitler's Germany.

=== Battle of France ===
After the catastrophic Battle of Sedan, the French forces and the government were forced to fall back from Paris. On 10–13 June 1940, Reynaud tried to re-establish his government at Tours. To reorganize the forces, he opened intensive negotiations on 12 June with General Charles de Gaulle, but Hélène de Portes personally intervened in their discussion and threw a temper tantrum, in their presence, at the prospect of what she considered to be futile further warfare. De Portes had a particular antipathy towards Winston Churchill and, according to Churchill's bodyguard Walter H. Thompson, caused a "hysterical" scene during Churchill's visit to Tours on 13 June 1940 and had to be restrained; Thompson also wrote that a knife was later found on her person. Churchill's own war memoirs do not mention de Portes at all, a silence noted by historian Antoine Capet.

As the French front continued to collapse, Reynaud, his government and his mistress briefly relocated at the Hotel Splendid, Bordeaux on 15 June. De Portes intensified her efforts to persuade her partner to offer terms of surrender, going to the length of intriguing with a key diplomat from the United States. The disgusted envoy later recalled that "I don't think her role in encouraging the defeatist elements during Reynaud's critical last days as prime minister should be underestimated. She spent an hour weeping in my office to get us to urge Reynaud to ask for an armistice."

Hélène de Portes' final intervention on 16 June was aimed at the last-ditch plan, strongly supported by Winston Churchill and Jean Monnet, to merge France and the United Kingdom into an emergency Franco-British Union. The document to create the Union was meant to be presented to the French Cabinet that evening as an alternative to requesting an armistice, but de Portes entered the stenographer's room where the document was being typed, read it, and then left to spread its contents among the Cabinet ministers who were leaning toward defeatism. Forewarned, the Cabinet rejected both the Union and Reynaud's government. The beaten premier resigned that evening.

=== Death ===
Now private citizens, Reynaud and de Portes left Bordeaux, driving southeast, away from the advancing German armies, intending to stop at Reynaud's holiday home at Grès, Herault, before fleeing to North Africa. On 28 June, with Reynaud at the wheel, their car inexplicably left the road and hit a plane tree at La Peyrade, between Frontignan and Sète; de Portes was all but decapitated, while Reynaud escaped with relatively minor head injuries. Hospitalized at Montpellier, Reynaud was arrested on his discharge and imprisoned for the rest of the war. At about the same time, French diplomat Dominique Leca was apprehended by police in Madrid while in possession of a diplomatic bag containing gold and jewellery destined for de Portes' children evacuated to the United States. The affair was used as propaganda by the Vichy government to further discredit the Third Republic.

=== Epitaphs ===
The British journalist Noel Barber characterized Hélène as follows:

The most powerful woman in France, she exercised a malign influence on the destinies of her country.

The American journalist and author Vincent Sheean added:

She was not chic, she was not charming, and she was not intelligent. Reynaud was used to her, depended on her, needed her: that was all.

== Depictions ==
Hélène de Portes is portrayed in Jean Marboeuf's 1993 film Pétain by Frédérique Tirmont. She was also the basis of the fictionalized character "Baronne de Porte" in Dennis Wheatley's novel, The Black Baroness.

In the 2020 biopic De Gaulle, she is played by French actress Philippine Leroy-Beaulieu.
