= List of spouses or partners of the president of France =

First Lady of France
- Première dame de France
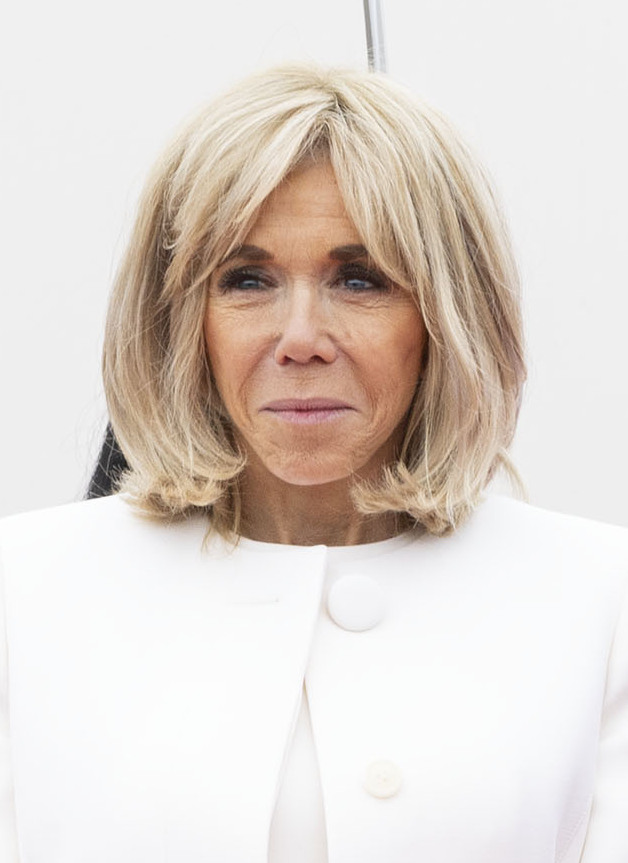
- Incumbent; Brigitte Macron since 14 May 2017
- Residence: Élysée Palace
- Inaugural holder: Élise Thiers
- Formation: 1848; 178 years ago

Spouses and companions of the president of France often play a protocol role at the Élysée Palace and during official visits, though they possess no official title. Brigitte Macron is the spouse of the current president, Emmanuel Macron, who took office on 14 May 2017.

== List ==
Portrait	Name	President	Period	Notes
	Élise Thiers (1818–1880)	Adolphe Thiers	1871–1873	
	Élisabeth de Mac Mahon (1834–1900)	Patrice de Mac-Mahon	1873–1879	
	Coralie Grévy (1811–1893)	Jules Grévy	1879–1887	
	Cécile Carnot (1841–1898)	Marie François Sadi Carnot	1887–1894	
	Hélène Casimir-Perier (1854–1912)	Jean Casimir-Perier	1894–1895	
	Berthe Faure (1842–1920)	Félix Faure	1895–1899	
	Marie-Louise Loubet (1843–1925)	Émile Loubet	1899–1906	
	Jeanne Fallières (1849–1939)	Armand Fallières	1906–1913	
	Henriette Poincaré (1858–1943)	Raymond Poincaré	1913–1920	
	Germaine Deschanel (1876–1959)	Paul Deschanel	1920	
	Jeanne Millerand (1864–1950)	Alexandre Millerand	1920–1924	
	Jeanne Doumergue (1879–1963)	Gaston Doumergue	1931	
	Blanche Doumer (1859–1933)	Paul Doumer	1931–1932	
	Marguerite Lebrun (1878–1947)	Albert Lebrun	1932–1940	
	Michelle Auriol (1896–1979)	Vincent Auriol	1947–1954	First presidential spouse of the Fourth Republic.
	Germaine Coty (1886–1955)	René Coty	1954–1955	
	Yvonne de Gaulle (1900–1979)	Charles de Gaulle	1959–1969	First presidential spouse of the Fifth Republic.
	Claude Pompidou (1912–2007)	Georges Pompidou	1969–1974	
	Anne-Aymone Giscard d'Estaing (born 1933)	Valéry Giscard d'Estaing	1974–1981	
	Danielle Mitterrand (1924–2011)	François Mitterrand	1981–1995	
	Bernadette Chirac (1933–2026)	Jacques Chirac	1995–2007	
	Cécilia Sarkozy (born 1957)	Nicolas Sarkozy	2007	Cécilia Ciganer-Albéniz and Nicolas Sarkozy divorced during his first year in office. Sarkozy and Bruni married several months later.
	Carla Bruni-Sarkozy (born 1967)	Nicolas Sarkozy	2008–2012	Cécilia Ciganer-Albéniz and Nicolas Sarkozy divorced during his first year in office. Sarkozy and Bruni married several months later.
	Valérie Trierweiler (born 1965)	François Hollande	2012–2014	Trierweiler and Hollande were never married, but she was widely considered the "de facto first lady".
	Brigitte Macron (born 1953)	Emmanuel Macron	2017–present	

== Current living presidential spouses or companions ==
Living French presidential spouses or companions as of September 7, 2026 (from oldest to youngest):

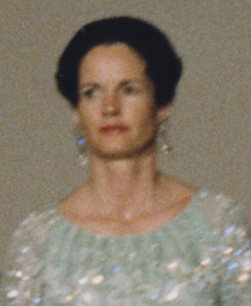
Anne-Aymone Giscard d'Estaing
(1974–1981)
Born 10 April 1933 (age 93)

== See also ==
- First Lady
- President of France
