= Henriette Poincaré =

French spouse of the president (1858–1943)

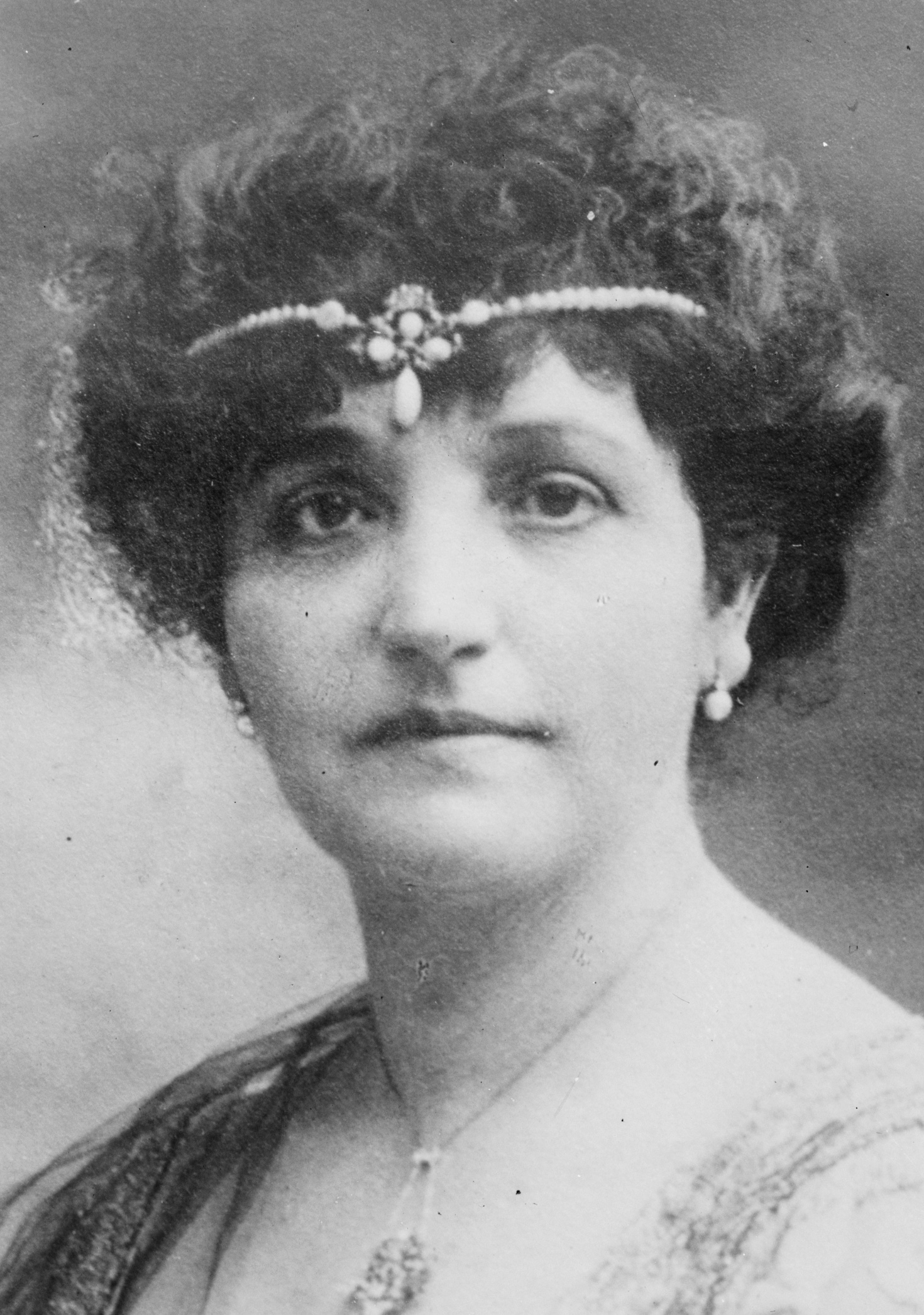

Spouse of the President of France
- In office 18 February 1913 – 18 February 1920
- President: Raymond Poincaré
- Preceded by: Jeanne Fallières
- Succeeded by: Germaine Deschanel

Personal details
- Born: Henriette Adeline Benucci; 8 May 1858 Passy, France
- Died: 19 May 1943 (aged 85) Paris, France
- Spouse(s): Dominic Killoran (m. 1883; div. 1890) Arthur Bazire (m. 1891; died 1892) Raymond Poincaré (m. 1904; died 1934)

Henriette Poincaré (born Henriette Adeline Benucci, (8 May 1858 – 19 May 1943) was the wife of French statesman Raymond Poincaré.

== Early life ==
Henriette Adeline Benucci was born in Passy, France on 8 May 1858. Her parents were Louise Mossbauer, a young servant and Raphael Benucci a coachman of Italian origin. She served for a time as a companion to old ladies of the bourgeoisie.

== Marriage ==
She was married twice before her marriage to Raymond Poincaré. Her first marriage ended in divorce in 1890; her second marriage ended with her husband's death in 1892.

She married Raymond Poincaré in a civil ceremony in Paris on 17 August 1904. The marriage was secretly solemnised religiously on 5 May 1913, a few months after Raymond was elected to the presidency of France, in their apartment at 10 Rue de Babylone (7th arrondissement of Paris) by the rector of the Catholic Institute of Paris, Mgr. Baudrillart, who had been a high school friend of Raymond's. When this secret leaked out, it gave the Radicals a way to criticise Raymond. The press also insulted Henriette for her love life.

Poincaré was a member of Aéroclub féminin la Stella, founded by Marie Surcouf.

In 1917, she was surprised in the garden of the Élysée Palace by an orangutan escaped from a circus that was then held at the nearby Rond-Point theater (or possibly, as another version of the incident has it, a chimpanzee escaped from his master's house, his master being a diplomat lodged near the palace).

Unofficial roles
Preceded by Jeanne Fallières	Spouse of the President of France; 1913–1920	Succeeded by Germaine Deschanel
