= Jeanne Fallières =

French spouse of the president (1849–1939)

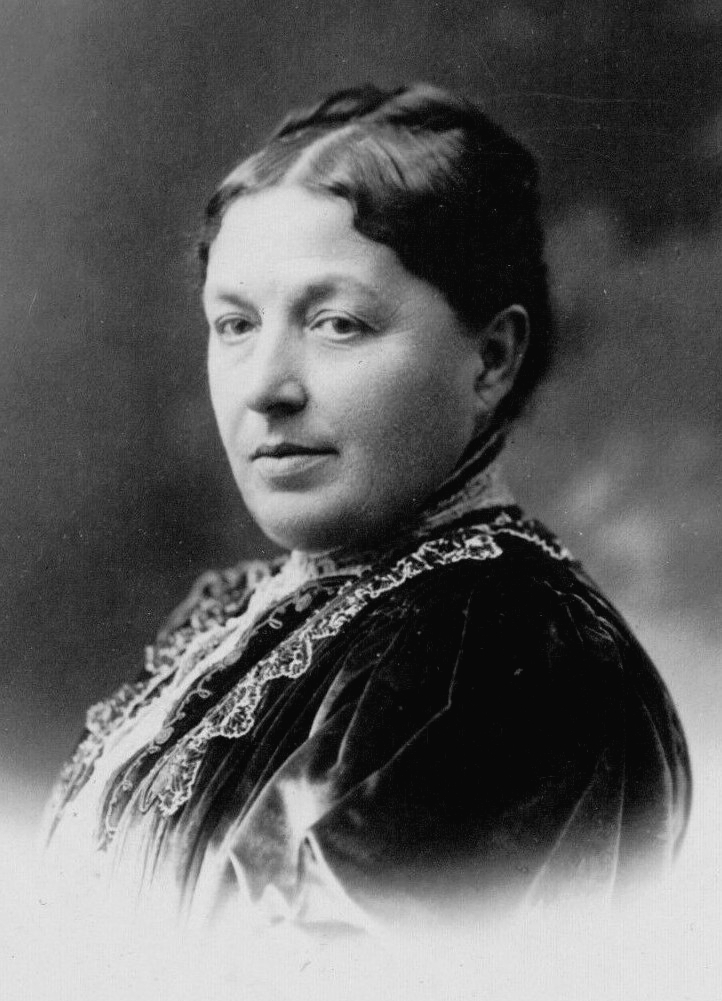

Spouse of the President of France
- In office 18 February 1906 – 18 February 1913
- President: Armand Fallières
- Preceded by: Marie-Louise Loubet
- Succeeded by: Henriette Poincaré

Personal details
- Born: Jeanne Bresson; May 24, 1849 Nérac, France
- Died: October 23, 1939 (aged 90) Mézin, France

Jeanne Fallières (24 May 1849 – 29 September 1939) was the spouse of French president Armand Fallières.

She did not like her public duties and was given a name for being stingy and misusing her position for economic purposes.

== See also ==
- List of wives and companions of the President of France
- Armand Fallières

Unofficial roles
Preceded by Marie-Louise Loubet	Spouse of the President of France; 1906–1913	Succeeded by Henriette Poincaré
