= Cécile Carnot =

French first lady

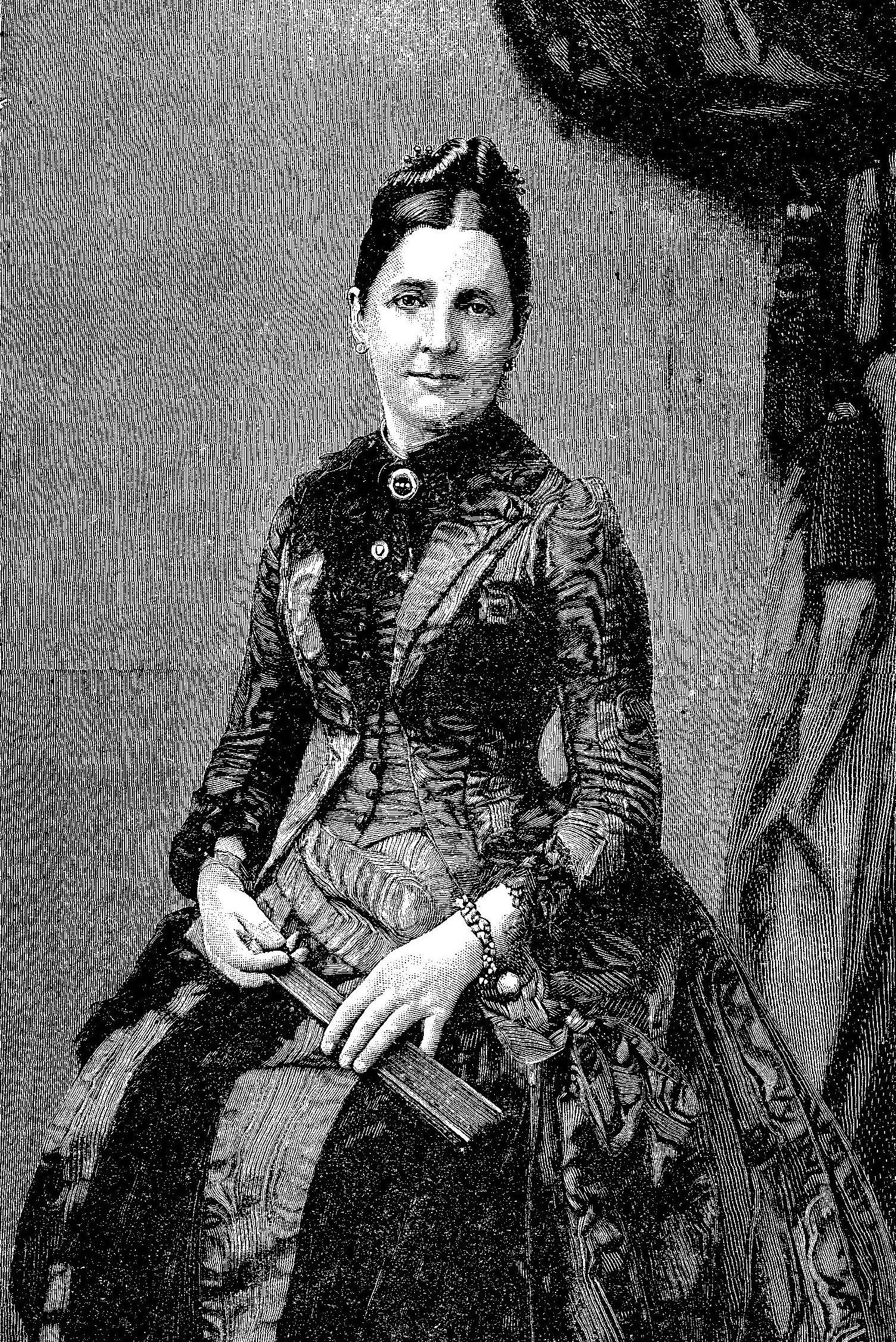
- Born: Marie Pauline Cécile Dupont-White; 20 July 1841; Paris, France
- Died: 30 September 1898 (aged 57)
- Other name: Marie Pauline Cécile Carnot
- Spouse: Marie François Sadi Carnot
- Children: Four
- Parents: Charles Brook Dupont-White (father); Cécile Olympe Corbie (mother)

Marie Pauline Cécile Carnot, née Dupont-White (English: /kɑːrˈnoʊ/ kar-NOH, French: [sesil kaʁno]; 20 July 1841 – 30 September 1898) was the wife of Marie François Sadi Carnot, the President of France from 1887 until his assassination in 1894.

== Life and work ==
Known as Cécile, she was born in the sixth arrondissement of Paris, the daughter of Charles Brook Dupont-White and Cécile Olympe Corbie. Her father was an economist. Cécile married Marie François Sadi Carnot in 1863.

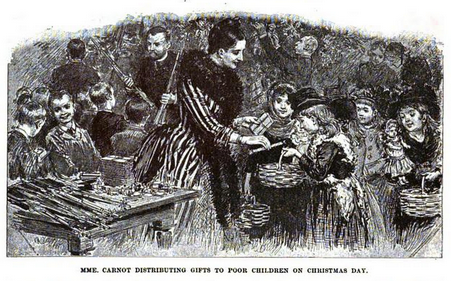
Illustration of Mme. Carnot distributing gifts to poor children on Christmas Day, from an 1894 publication.

Sadi and Cécile Carnot had four children together: Claire (who would marry Paul Cunisset ), Sadi, Ernest and François. The couple were particularly united and no extra-marital relationships are attributed to them. Cécile Carnot often advised her husband in political matters.

As the wife of the president, Cécile Carnot devoted a lot of her time to representation in public and entertaining at the Presidential Palace. She hosted three balls annually and arranged garden parties at which she introduced tennis. She regarded representation as an important part of the political career for her spouse. In 1889 she introduced the annual Christmas dinner for poor children, and it became a tradition and has been held ever since.

Cécile Carnot (around 1890)

She played a political role when she negotiated with Georges Ernest Boulanger, preventing a coup. After her husband's assassination, she lived in seclusion. She had four children, a daughter Claire and three sons, Sadi, Ernest, and François.

She died of heart disease at the Château de Presles de Cerny, on 30 September 1898, at the age of 57, four years after her husband. Unable to join him in the Pantheon, she is buried in the cemetery of Passy.

== Honors ==
- Poet George Williamson wrote a poem, "To Mme Sadi Carnot, On the Death of her Husband, Late President of France" (1894).
- A variety of rose was named in her memory.

Unofficial roles
Preceded by Coralie Grévy	Spouse of the President of France; 1887–1894	Succeeded by Hélène Casimir-Perier
