= Berthe Faure =

Félix Faure's spouse (1842–1920)

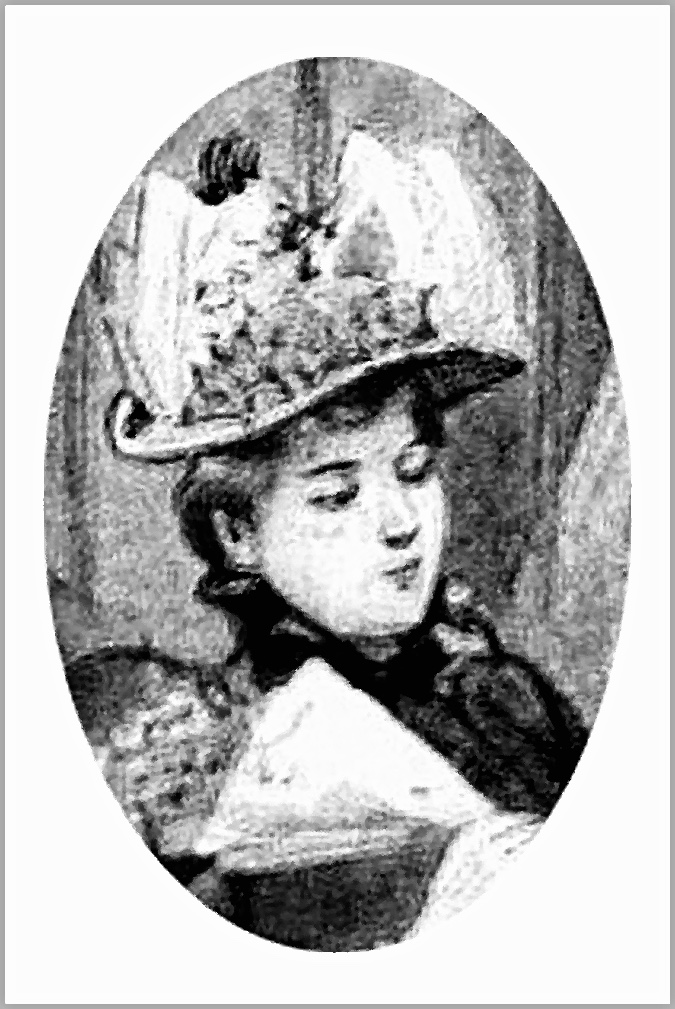

Berthe Faure (1842-1920) was the wife Félix Faure, who was President of France from 1895 to 1899.

As wife of the president, Berthe Faure was required by her spouse to fulfill representational duties. She hosted two balls annually and gala dinners for 8.000 guests. At Saturdays, she had her own gatherings; among her friends were the father of Marcel Proust. Berthe Faure reportedly worshiped her spouse and was regarded by her family as naive. She did know about the adultery of her spouse but preferred to pretend not to notice.

Unofficial roles
Preceded by Hélène Casimir-Perier	Spouse of the President of France; 1895–1899	Succeeded by Marie-Louise Loubet
