= Marie-Louise Loubet =

Spouse of the President of France (1843–1925)

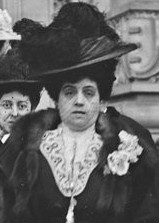
- Marie-Louise Loubet in 1906.

Spouse of the President of France
- In role 18 February 1899 – 18 February 1906
- President: Émile Loubet
- Preceded by: Berthe Faure
- Succeeded by: Jeanne Fallières

Personal details
- Born: Marie Louise Picard; 23 September 1843 Montélimar, Drôme, France
- Died: 10 September 1925 (aged 81) Montélimar, Drôme, France
- Spouse: Émile Loubet

Marie-Louise Loubet (1843–1925) was the wife of the President of France Émile Loubet.

She was reportedly not interested in participating in representation but did so anyway, hosting garden parties and accompanying her spouse to the theatre and opera. Her daughter performed many of her tasks. She was however reportedly somewhat interested in diplomacy and once referred to as the presidential adviser in foreign policy.

She received the Grand Cordon of the Order of Charity of the Ottoman Empire in early 1900. When Marie Curie was invited to the Elysée palace this happened:

In the course of the evening, a lady came up to Marie and said, "Would you like me to present you to the king of Greece." Marie innocently and politely replied, "I don't really think so. I don't see the utility of it." The lady was shocked and Marie suddenly realized that it was Madame Loubet. She blushed, and said quickly, "But-but, naturally, I shall do whatever you please. Just as you please, Madame, just as you please."

Unofficial roles
Preceded by Berthe Faure	Spouse of the President of France; 1899–1906	Succeeded by Jeanne Fallières
