= Yvonne de Gaulle =

Wife of Charles de Gaulle (1900–1979)

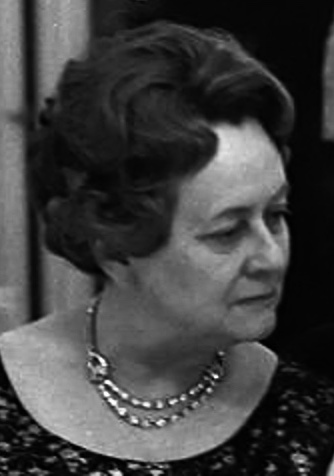
- Yvonne in 1968

Spouse of the President of France
- In role 8 January 1959 – 28 April 1969
- President: Charles de Gaulle
- Preceded by: Germaine Coty (1955)
- Succeeded by: Claude Pompidou

Personal details
- Born: Yvonne Charlotte Anne Marie Vendroux; 22 May 1900 Calais, France
- Died: 8 November 1979 (aged 79) Paris, France
- Spouse: Charles de Gaulle (m. 1921; died 1970)
- Children: Philippe; Élisabeth; Anne

Yvonne Charlotte Anne-Marie de Gaulle (French pronunciation: [ivɔn ʃaʁlɔt an maʁi də ɡol]; née Vendroux [vɑ̃dʁu]; 22 May 1900 – 8 November 1979) was the wife of Charles de Gaulle. The couple had three children: Philippe de Gaulle (1921–2024), Élisabeth de Gaulle (1924–2013), and Anne de Gaulle (1928–1948), who was born with Down syndrome. Yvonne de Gaulle, along with her husband, set up a charity, La fondation Anne-de-Gaulle, to help children with disabilities.

Yvonne and Charles were married on 6 April 1921. She is known for the quote, "The presidency is temporary—but the family is permanent." She and her husband narrowly escaped an assassination attempt on 22 August 1962, when their Citroën DS was targeted by machine gun fire arranged by Jean Bastien-Thiry at the Petit-Clamart.

Like her husband, Yvonne de Gaulle was a conservative Catholic, and campaigned against prostitution, the sale of pornography in newsstands, and the televised display of nudity and sex, which was echoed in her famous nickname, Tante Yvonne (“Auntie Yvonne”). Later, she unsuccessfully tried to persuade de Gaulle to outlaw miniskirts in France.

As first lady of France, Yvonne de Gaulle was reputed to be very discreet; as such, despite numerous appearances, she never gave any radio or televised interviews, and the broader public never learned the sound of her voice.

== Biography ==
=== Origins ===
Yvonne Vendroux came from a family of Calais industrialists with Burgundian roots. The family name actually originated in The Netherlands, changed from the Dutch Van Droeg when the family emigrated during the era of William III of England (William of Orange). Yvonne's ancestor then married a Calaisienne during the French Revolution.

Her father, Jacques, was the chairman of the board of directors of a biscuit company. Her mother, Marguerite (née Forest), came from a family in the Ardennes and became the fourth (some say sixth) woman in France to obtain a driving licence. She was the granddaughter of Alfred Corneau, an industrialist from Charleville-Mézières. The Vendroux family spent their summers in the chateau in Notre-Dame de Sept-Fontaines abbey, in the Ardennes.

Her eldest brother, Jacques Vendroux, (born 1897) became deputy and mayor of Calais. Her younger brother, Jean (born 1901), married Madeleine Schallier (1907–2000), fathered seven children, and died in an auto accident in 1956. Her sister, Suzanne Vendroux (28 February 1905, in Calais – 27 December 1980 in Worthing, England), married Jean Rerolle (12 July 1897, in Châteauroux – 23 March 1978, Neuilly-sur-Seine) on 5 March 1934 in Fagnon. They had two children, Jacques-Henri (21 January 1935, 17th arrondissement, Paris) and Marguerite-Marie.

=== Education ===
Yvonne's parents provided her with a strict education, in keeping with their elevated social status and the customs of the era.

She learned to read at home and studied with the Dominican Order of Asnières-sur-Seine (later moving to Périgueux), and was encouraged, as many girls were at the time, to become proficient in needlework. The children were expected to vousvoyer (i.e. use the formal "vous" with) their elders, and during World War I went with their governesses to Canterbury, England, not returning to their parents in France until the end of the year. They later settled in Wissant, a seaside community in Calais on the English Channel.

=== Marriage to Charles de Gaulle ===
Yvonne met Charles de Gaulle in 1920, who was then a military captain returning from a mission in Poland. The meeting was secretly arranged by the Vendroux family.

Their first date was to the Grand Palais during the fall exhibition to see the painting The Woman in Blue by Kees van Dongen. At a tea shortly after, Charles spilled his cup on Yvonne's dress: nonplussed, she laughed, and they continued courting.

Charles invited Yvonne to a Saint-Cyr military ball at the Hotel des Réservoirs, in Versailles, in support of the institution where he had studied from 1912 to 1918. Two days later, Yvonne declared to her parents, "It will be him, or no one."

They were engaged on 11 November, before the end of Captain de Gaulle's leave, and married on 7 April 1921 in the church of Notre-Dame de Calais. De Gaulle played on Yvonne's family business when he expressed his joy on the occasion, writing to a friend, "I am marrying the biscuits of Vendroux."

They honeymooned in Northern Italy and went on to have three children, a boy and two girls:

- Philippe de Gaulle, (28 December 1921 – 13 March 2024)
- Élisabeth de Gaulle, (later Boissieu) (15 May 1924 – 2 April 2013)
- Anne de Gaulle (1 January 1928 – 6 February 1948)

Anne de Gaulle was born with Down syndrome, and unlike common practice of the time she was kept with the family her whole life, until she died of bronchial pneumonia at only twenty years of age.

=== The Boisserie ===
In 1934, the de Gaulle family acquired the "Brasserie" property, renaming it "La Boisserie", at Colombey-les-Deux-Églises. The choice of area was made in consideration of her husband's occupation as a military officer, as it was about midway between Paris, where the Ministry of Defence was situated, and the eastern part of the country, that bordered the then-traditional enemy country of Germany.

As a horticulturist, Yvonne de Gaulle often tended to the garden. The high-walled surroundings also protected their daughter Anne de Gaulle from the indiscretion of the public.

=== The war years ===
In June 1940, Yvonne evacuated herself and the children to Bretagne, where her husband briefly visited them, advising her to, if necessary, go south with the children. Despite this advice, she and the children went to Brest and left on a Dutch ferry that took them to Falmouth. This ferry turned out to be the last ship leaving the port before the advancing Germans took over the area. After arriving in Falmouth, the family rejoined Charles in London, where Philippe then joined the Free French Naval Forces (FNFL). Yvonne and their two daughters stayed with her husband during the war years, moving as he moved with the headquarters of the Free French, later the provisional government.

=== Anne's death, and the "desert years" ===
Following the liberation of Paris on 25 August 1944, Yvonne and her two daughters returned to France, first living in rented quarters while the Boisserie was repaired (because of a fire) and somewhat extended (the most visible sign being a tower where the General wanted his private office to be). Having returned to the Boisserie, the family was struck by the loss of their daughter, Anne, on 6 February 1948, aged twenty.

Yvonne and Charles had previously created the Fondation Anne de Gaulle ("Anne de Gaulle Foundation"), which was designed to arrange a home for young women who had intellectual disabilities. It operated from the Château de Vert-Cœur at Milon-la-Chapelle, which had been purchased by Yvonne, and was recognised as an institution of public utility on 30 May 1945. Yvonne would continue to work with this foundation for the rest of her life. Future French president Georges Pompidou would become a director of the foundation, and subsequently became a close friend of the de Gaulles.

Apart from their loss, the couple's time at the Boisserie passed peacefully, until the May 1958 political crisis called Charles back to service for his country.

=== First Lady ===
On 21 December 1958, Yvonne de Gaulle became the First Lady of France, when then-Prime minister Charles de Gaulle was elected President of the French Republic. The couple took a Citroën to the President's residence, Elysée Palace. Her couturier was Jacques Heim. She was known to be tenacious, conservative, but could also be warm.

During her husband's tenure as president from 1959 to 1969, Yvonne de Gaulle led an austere and measured life. On a typical day, she would enjoy three meals with her husband, reading the newspaper Le Figaro at breakfast, having evening television sessions, and taking Sunday masses at the palace chapel. She epitomized tradition, moral values, and a deep sense of duty. Her Catholic faith influenced the conservative view of her husband on moral matters; after her arrival at the palace, one of the first things she asked was for a pietà to be supplied to the residence; the Musée du Louvre obliged by lending one. Later, when her husband invited actress Brigitte Bardot to the palace, she threatened to refuse her on the grounds that she had been divorced. Uncharacteristically, she went on to intervene in favour of the authorization of birth control pills at a time prior to the issuance of Humanae Vitae by Pope Paul VI.

The couple welcomed Dwight Eisenhower and the Kennedys during their tenure. In 1961, when the American presidential couple John F. Kennedy and Jackie Kennedy were invited by General de Gaulle, Yvonne took the initiative to forge links with the American first lady by taking her to visit the childcare school located on Boulevard Brune in the 14th arrondissement. After the assassination of President Kennedy two years later, Madame de Gaulle invited her to rest and avoid media scrutiny in Paris.

The de Gaulle family would have a brush with uncertainty on 22 August 1962, when Charles and Yvonne were targeted by an assassination attempt in Clamart, organized by French Air Force Lieutenant-Colonel Jean Bastien-Thiry. As de Gaulle's black Citroën DS drove through Petit-Clamart, it was met by a barrage of submachine-gun fire. De Gaulle and his entourage, which included Yvonne, survived the attempt without any casualties or serious injuries, while the perpetrators of the attempt were all subsequently arrested and put on trial. In February 1963 at Fort d'Ivry, Bastien-Thiry was convicted of leading the assassination plot and became the last person to be executed by firing squad in France.

Charles de Gaulle managed to laugh off the incident without disrespecting police, but he was deeply impressed with his wife's stoicism, reportedly saying, "You are brave, Yvonne."

During the civil unrest in May 1968, Yvonne accompanied her husband during his displacement to Baden-Baden. She opposed the "Communist" uprising and protests.

=== Retirement and death ===
Upon Charles' resignation from the presidency in 1969, Yvonne accompanied him on a six-week retirement trip to Ireland; a trip that became famous for the photos of the couple and the aide-de-camp, General François Flohic, that were taken on the beach.

Madame de Gaulle was widowed on 9 November 1970, when Charles died suddenly of an abdominal aortic aneurysm. She remained at the Boisserie, until her own failing health induced her to enter a retirement home of the sisters of the Immaculate Conception in Paris in 1978. She died at the Val-de-Grâce hospital in Paris at the age of 79 — the same age her husband had been at the time of his death (although her husband had died on the calendar year of his 80th birthday) and on the eve of the ninth anniversary of his death, 9 November 1979.

Her remains were subsequently interred at Colombey-les-Deux-Églises, alongside her husband and their daughter Anne.

== Tributes ==
- Book Madame de Gaulle (1981), by Marcel Jullian.
- Melun's retirement home is named after Yvonne de Gaulle.
- In front of Notre-Dame de Calais cathedral is a stele, in memory of the marriage of Yvonne Vendroux and Charles de Gaulle, with the mention taken from the latter's book, Memoirs of Hope: "For you Yvonne, without whom nothing would have been done."
- In 1963, accordionist René Saget released a song, Le tango de Tante Yvonne, which sold 10,000 copies.
- On 9 November 2013, the anniversary of the death of General de Gaulle, a bronze statue by Élisabeth Cibot representing Charles and Yvonne de Gaulle holding hands was inaugurated in Calais. It is inspired by a photo of the presidential couple, on an official visit to the city in 1959.

== Sources ==
- Bertrand Meyer-Stabley, Les Dames de l'Élysée – Celles d'hier et de demain, Librairie Académique Perrin, Paris.
- Anne-Cécile Beaudoin, « Trianon. Le président reçoit comme un prince », parismatch.com, 22 juin 2016.
- « Elisabeth de Gaulle est morte », in lemonde.fr, 5 avril 2013.
- https://www.letelegramme.fr/ig/generales/fait-du-jour/les-heures-bretonnes-de-de-gaulle-18-06-2010-959624.php
- « Yvonne de Gaulle », sur linternaute.com.
- « Yvonne de Gaulle, la discrète surannée », sur liberation.fr.
- Dominique Jamet, « Il y a cent ans : Félix Faure »(Archive • Wikiwix • Archive.is • Google • Que faire ?) (consulté le 18 mai 2017), Marianne, 2 février 1998, sur Marianne.
- Éric Roussel, Charles de Gaulle, éd. Gallimard, Paris, 2002, 1032 p. (ISBN 2-07-075241-0 et 978-2070752416), p. 851-852.
- Jean-Marie Guénois, « De Gaulle, foi de Général », Le Figaro, encart « Le Figaro et vous », samedi 17 / dimanche 18 juin 2017, page 42.
- Le 24 mars 1959 dans le ciel : Orly accueille le baptême de la Caravelle « Lorraine ».
- « Lancé par le Général de Gaulle », sur linternaute.com.
- Les Présidents de la République Pour les Nuls, First Éditions, 2011 (lire en ligne), p. 205.

== Bibliography ==
- Jean Lacouture, Charles de Gaulle – Le souverain 1959–1970, t. III, éd. du Seuil, 1986 (ISBN 2-02-009393-6), pp. 279–282.
- Max Gallo, De Gaulle, tome IV, La Statue du commandeur, éd. Robert Laffont, Paris, 1998 (ISBN 2-266-09305-3); rééd. Pocket, Paris, 2006, p. 29.
- « Une statue de Charles et Yvonne de Gaulle à Calais », Le Figaro, encart « Le Figaro et vous », mardi 22 octobre 2013, page 34.
- Geneviève Moll, Yvonne de Gaulle : l'inattendue, éd. Ramsay, 1999 (ISBN 9782841144105).
- Florence d'Harcourt, Tante Yvonne : une femme d'officier, éd. Éditeur Indépendant, 2007 (ISBN 978-2353350735).
- Émilie Aubry et Muriel Pleynet, Pas de deux à l'Élysée, éd. Héloïse d'Ormesson, 2006 (ISBN 2-35087-025-1) (notice BnF no FRBNF40197814).
- Alain Peyrefitte, C'était de Gaulle, éd. Gallimard, 2002 (ISBN 2-07-076506-7).
- Bertrand Meyer-Stabley, Les Dames de l'Élysée : celles d'hier et de demain, Librairie Académique Perrin, Paris.
- Frédérique Neau-Dufour, Yvonne de Gaulle, éd. Fayard, 2010, 590 p.
- Henry Gidel, Les de Gaulle : elle et lui, Flammarion, 2018.
- Gérard Bardy, Les Femmes du Général, Plon, 2018.
- Caroline Pigozzi et Philippe Goulliaud, Les Photos insolites de Charles de Gaulle, éd. Gründ / Plon, 2019.
- Christine Kerdellant, De Gaulle et les femmes, Robert Laffont, 2020.

Unofficial roles
Vacant Title last held by Germaine Coty	Spouse of the President of France; 1959–1969	Succeeded by Claude Pompidou
