= Jeanne Millerand =

French spouse of the President (1864–1950)

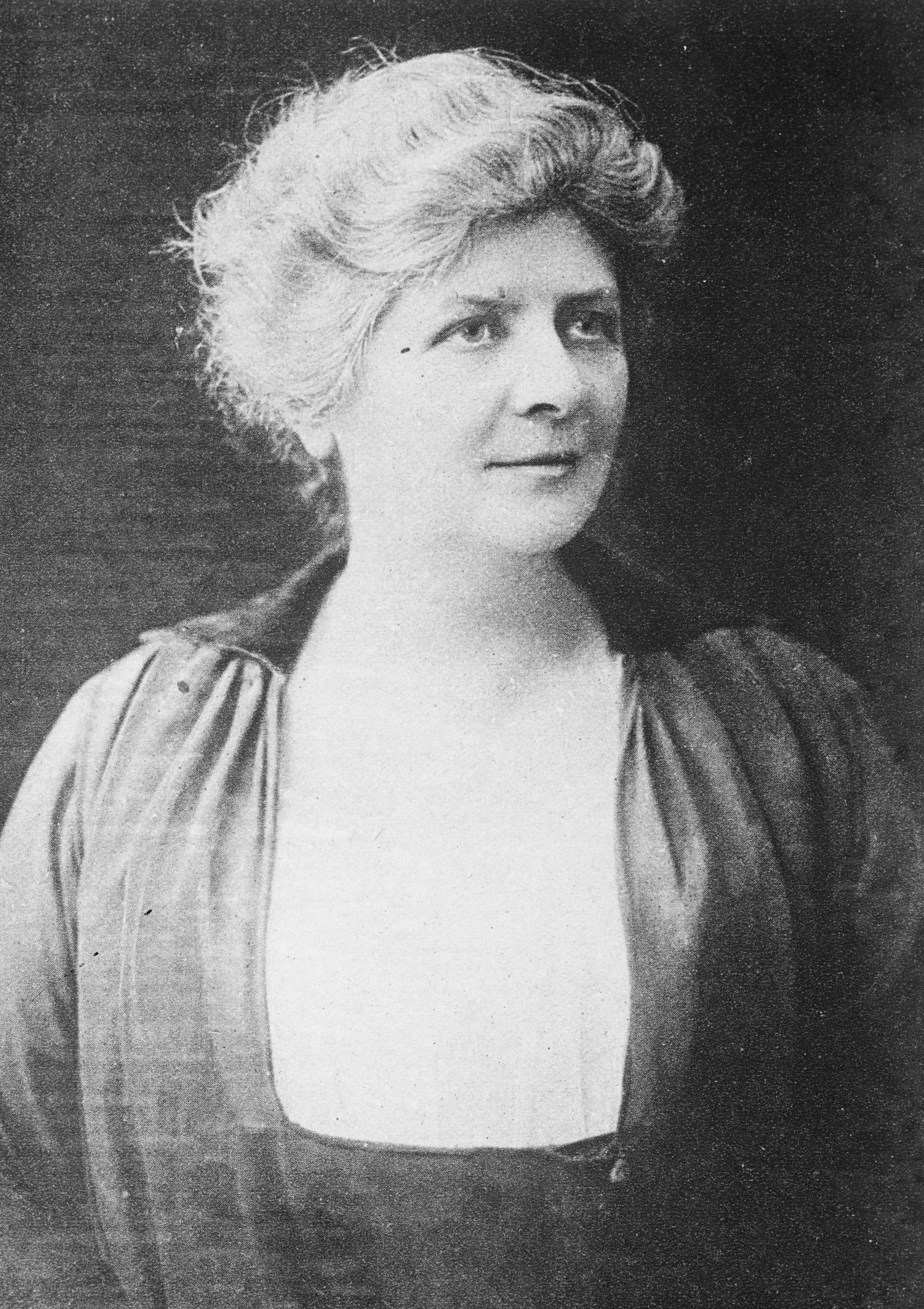
Jeanne Millerand

Jeanne Millerand (May 7, 1864 – October 23, 1950) was the wife of the President of France Alexandre Millerand.

Jeanne Millerand was admired for her representational qualities. She was old fashioned and conventional; she forbade her children from listening to modern music, and despite the new fashion of the 1920s, she continued to dress in older fashions, in a corset, long skirts, and big hats.

Unofficial roles
Preceded by Germaine Deschanel	Spouse of the President of France; 1920–1924	Vacant Title next held by Jeanne Doumergue
