= Philippe de Gaulle =

French admiral and son of Charles de Gaulle (1921–2024)

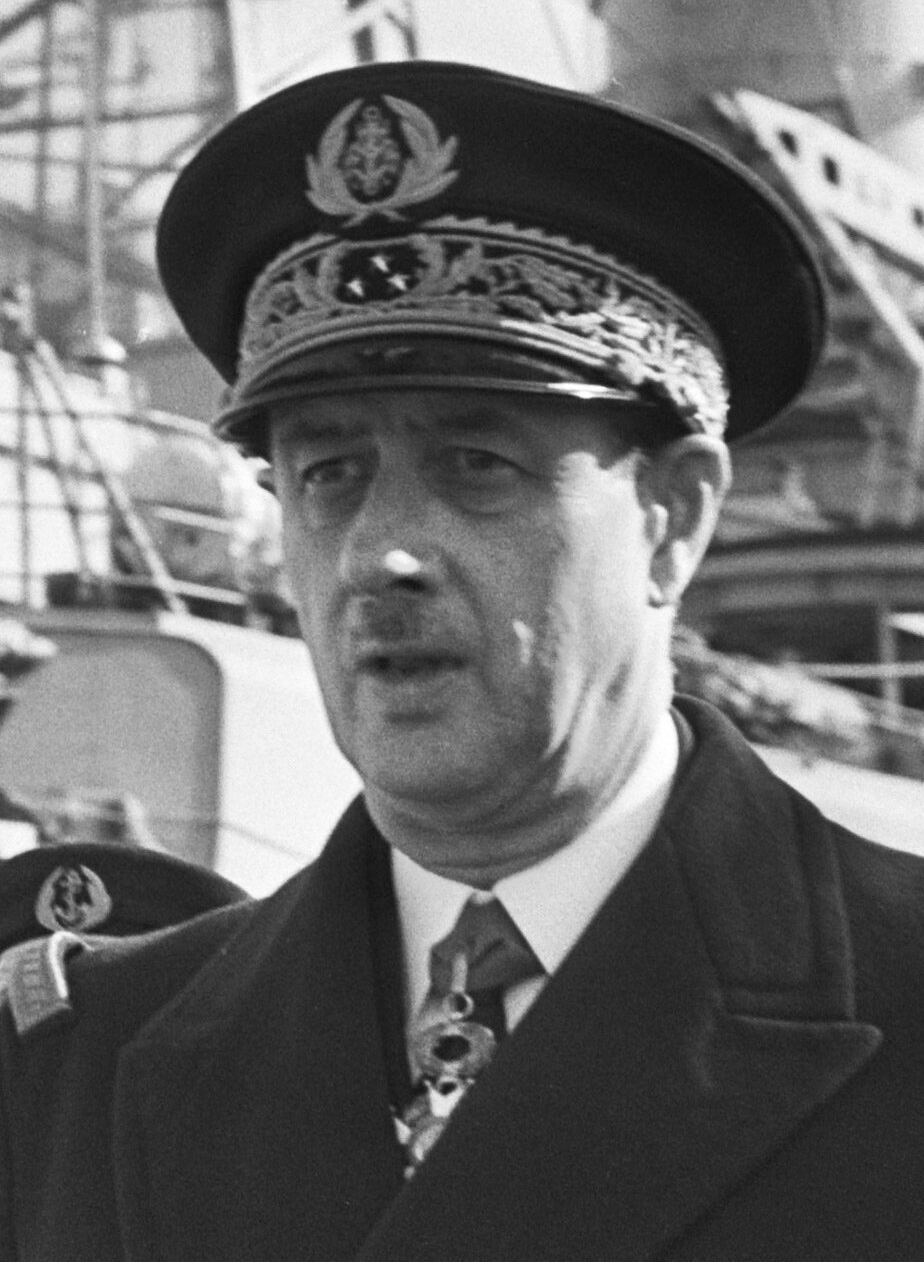
- Philippe de Gaulle in 1976

Senator for Paris
- In office 2 October 1986 – 30 September 2004

Personal details
- Born: Philippe Henri Xavier Antoine de Gaulle; 28 December 1921 Paris, France
- Died: 13 March 2024 (aged 102) Paris, France
- Party: Rally for the Republic
- Other political affiliations: Union for a Popular Movement
- Spouse: Henriette de Montalembert de Cers (m. 1947; died 2014)
- Children: Charles; Yves; Jean; Pierre
- Parents: Charles de Gaulle; Yvonne Vendroux
- Education: École navale

Military service
- Allegiance: Free France; France
- Branch/service: Free French Naval Forces; French Navy
- Years of service: 1940–1982
- Rank: Admiral
- Battles/wars: World War II; First Indochina War
- Awards: Grand Cross of the Legion of Honour; Grand Cross of the National Order of Merit; Croix de Guerre 1939–1945

Philippe Henri Xavier Antoine de Gaulle (French: [filip də ɡol]; 28 December 1921 – 13 March 2024) was a French admiral and senator. He was the eldest and last surviving child of General Charles de Gaulle, the first president of the French Fifth Republic, and of his wife, Yvonne.

== Early life ==
De Gaulle was born in Paris on 28 December 1921 and was baptised on 8 June the following year in the Church of St Francis Xavier in the 7th Arrondissement. He was educated at the Collège Stanislas de Paris, where his father had also studied, and subsequently joined the French Navy. According to Charles de Gaulle, Philippe was named after his family ancestor Jean-Baptiste de Gaulle, but it has been suggested that he was named after General Philippe Pétain, of whom his father was a great admirer.

== Free French naval officer ==
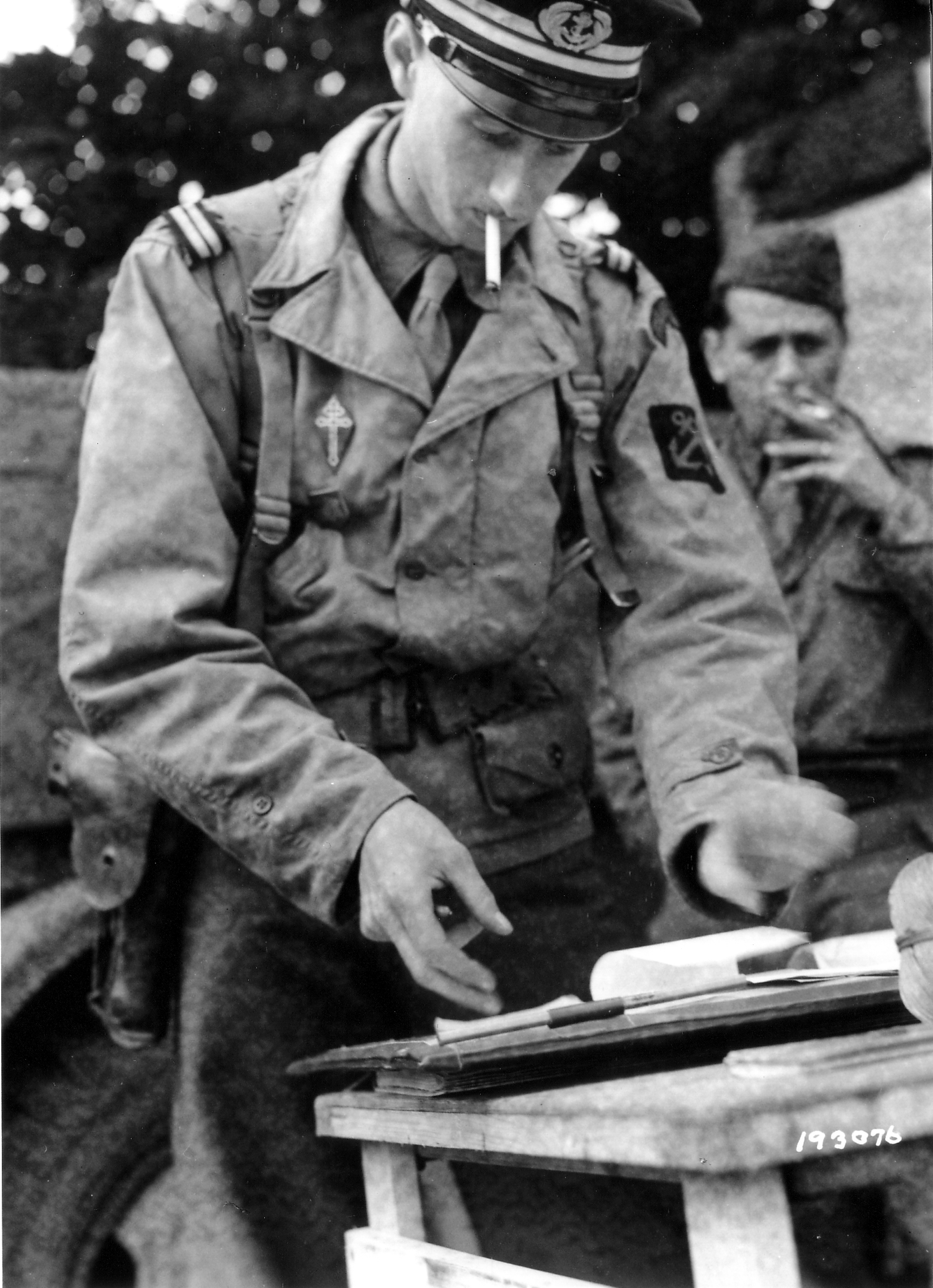
Philippe during the Second World War

A student at the École Navale at the time of the invasion of France in 1940, he did not hear his father's appeal of 18 June but escaped to the United Kingdom, declared his allegiance to Free France and joined the Free French Naval Forces.

During the Second World War he fought in the Channel campaign and in the Battle of the Atlantic. Promoted to sub-lieutenant in 1943, de Gaulle participated in the Battle of France (1944–1945) as a platoon commander of the Régiment Blindé de Fusiliers-Marins, an armoured regiment of marines of the 2nd Armoured Division. On 25 August 1944, he participated in the liberation of Paris and was sent from the Gare Montparnasse to carry the order to obtain the surrender of the Germans entrenched at the Palais Bourbon in the premises of the National Assembly. Risking being shot if things went wrong, he negotiated alone and unarmed among them. He fought in the Vosges during the winter of 1944–1945.

== Postwar naval career ==
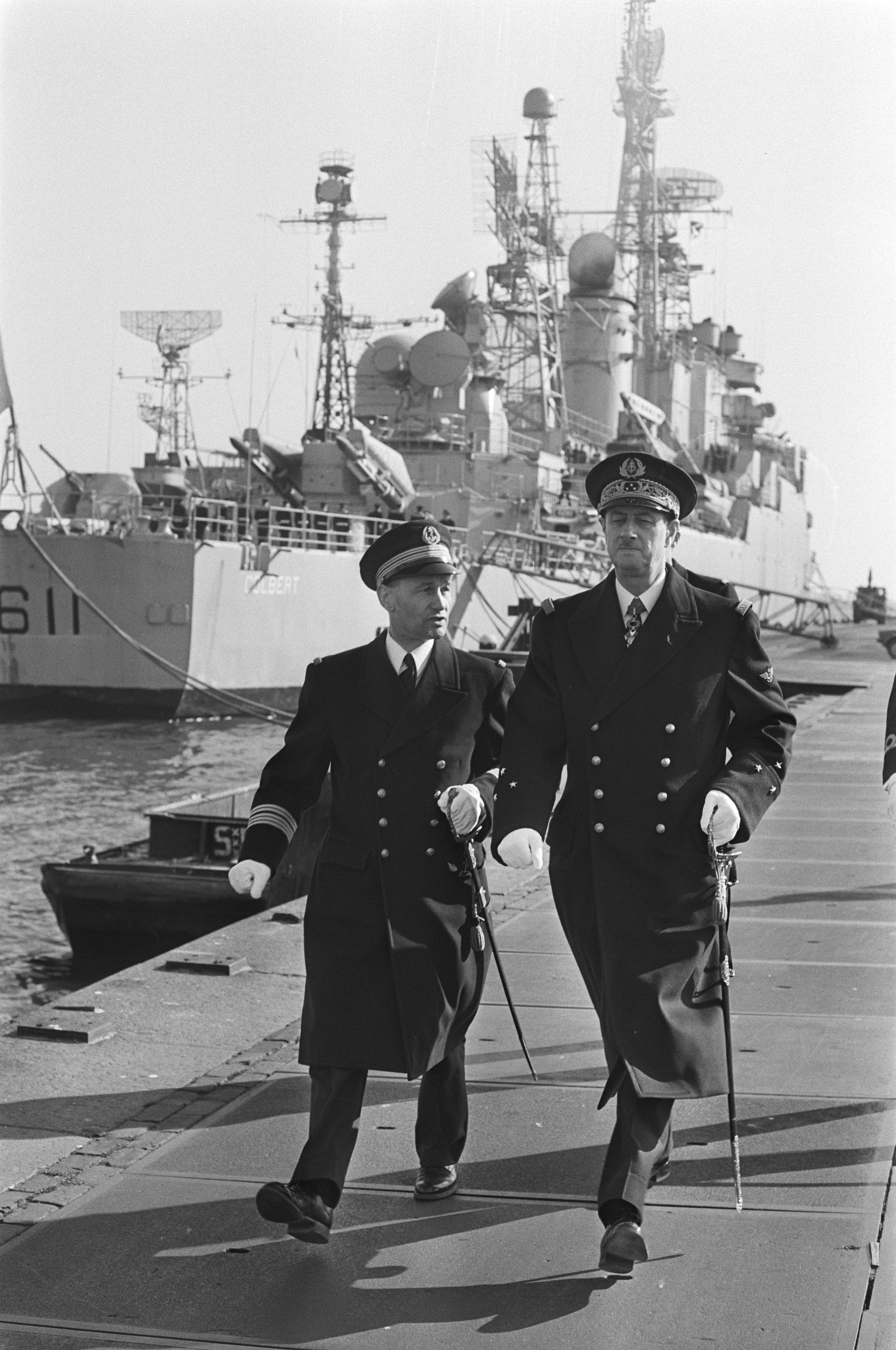
Vice-admiral de Gaulle exiting the Colbert in Amsterdam, 1976

De Gaulle was promoted to lieutenant in 1948, and received in 1952 the command of the naval flottille 6F. He was promoted to corvette captain (lieutenant-commander) in 1956 and to frigate captain (commander) in 1961, commanding the fast frigate (Escorteur Rapide) Le Picard (1960–1961). He pursued a military career as a French Naval Aviation pilot and was made naval aviation commander of the Paris Region (1964–1966). Promoted to capitaine de vaisseau rank in 1966, he commanded the missile-launching frigate Suffren from 1967 to 1968. In 1971 he was promoted to rear-admiral (contre-amiral), becoming commander of the naval group of test and measurement ("GROUPEM") (1973–1974) where he hoisted his flag on the Missile Range Instrumentation and Command and Control ship Henri Poincaré. He was then commander of aviation maritime patrol (ALPATMAR) from 1974 to 1975 and was promoted to vice-admiral (vice-amiral) in 1975. From 1976 to 1977 he was Commander of the Atlantic Fleet and was elevated to squadron vice-admiral (vice-amiral d'escadre) in 1977.

Promoted to admiral in 1980, de Gaulle finished his military career as Inspector General of the Navy, retiring in 1982.

== Politician ==
From 1986 to 2004 (reelected in 1995), de Gaulle served as a senator from Paris in the RPR and UMP. Near the end of the 1960s, a "legitimist" Gaullist party led by Joseph Bozzi advocated Philippe de Gaulle as the only legitimate heir of Gaullism. The young De Gaulle's influence, however, remained very low.

== Personal life ==
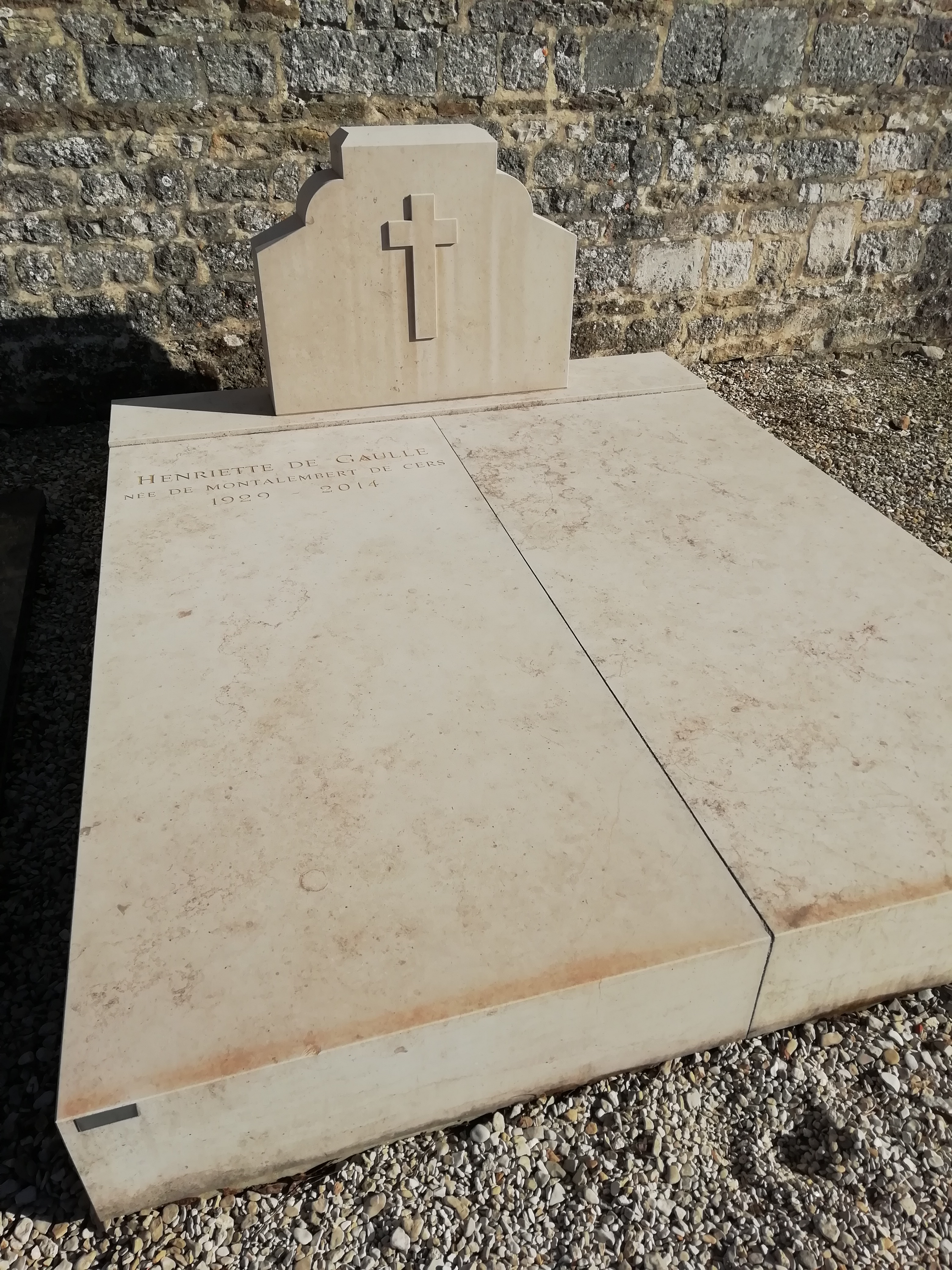
Burial place of Henriette de Gaulle at Colombey-les-Deux-Églises

On 30 December 1947, de Gaulle married Henriette de Montalembert de Cers (1 January 1929 – 22 June 2014), a descendant of the family of the Marquis de Montalembert. The marriage was blessed by father Louis of the Trinity, OCD (who had been one of the commanders of the Free French Naval Forces during the war, known civilly as Georges Thierry d'Argenlieu). The couple had four sons:

- Charles de Gaulle (born 25 September 1948 at Dijon), corporate lawyer, first MEP in the UDF and RPR labels, he joined the National Front in May 1999
- Yves de Gaulle (born 1 September 1951 at Rabat), technocrat, general secretary of GDF SUEZ
- Jean de Gaulle (born 13 June 1953 at Bourg-en-Bresse), former deputy of Deux-Sèvres and Paris (1986–2007, resigned), he became the master to the Court of Auditors
- Pierre de Gaulle (born 20 June 1963 at Suresnes)

De Gaulle spent his later years at an EHPAD residential care home in Neuilly-sur-Seine before transferring to the military retirement home at Les Invalides in Paris. He turned 100 in 2021 and died at Les Invalides on 13 March 2024, at the age of 102. After a private funeral at the St Louis Cathedral on 20 March 2024, President Emmanuel Macron led a national tribute at Les Invalides.

== Honours ==
- Grand Cross of the Legion of Honour (2005) (Grand Officer – 1980)
- Grand Cross of the National Order of Merit
- War Cross 1939–1945
- Medal of Aeronautics

Charles never appointed his son a Companion of the Liberation, stating tout le monde sait que tu fus mon premier compagnon ("everyone knows that you were my first companion"), probably to avoid being open to possible accusations of nepotism. Yet, in the opinion of some Gaullists and companions, Philippe would have been deserving of the honour, given his immediate engagement in Free France and his service in the army for five years, often at the forefront. Nor did Philippe's father award his son the Medal of the Resistance.
