= Charles de Gaulle Foundation =

French organization created in 1971

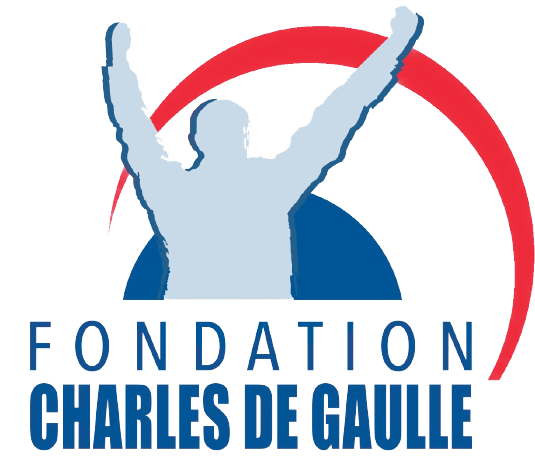
- Formation: 1971
- Headquarters: Paris, France
- Location: France
- President: Hervé Gaymard
- Website: https://www.charles-de-gaulle.org/

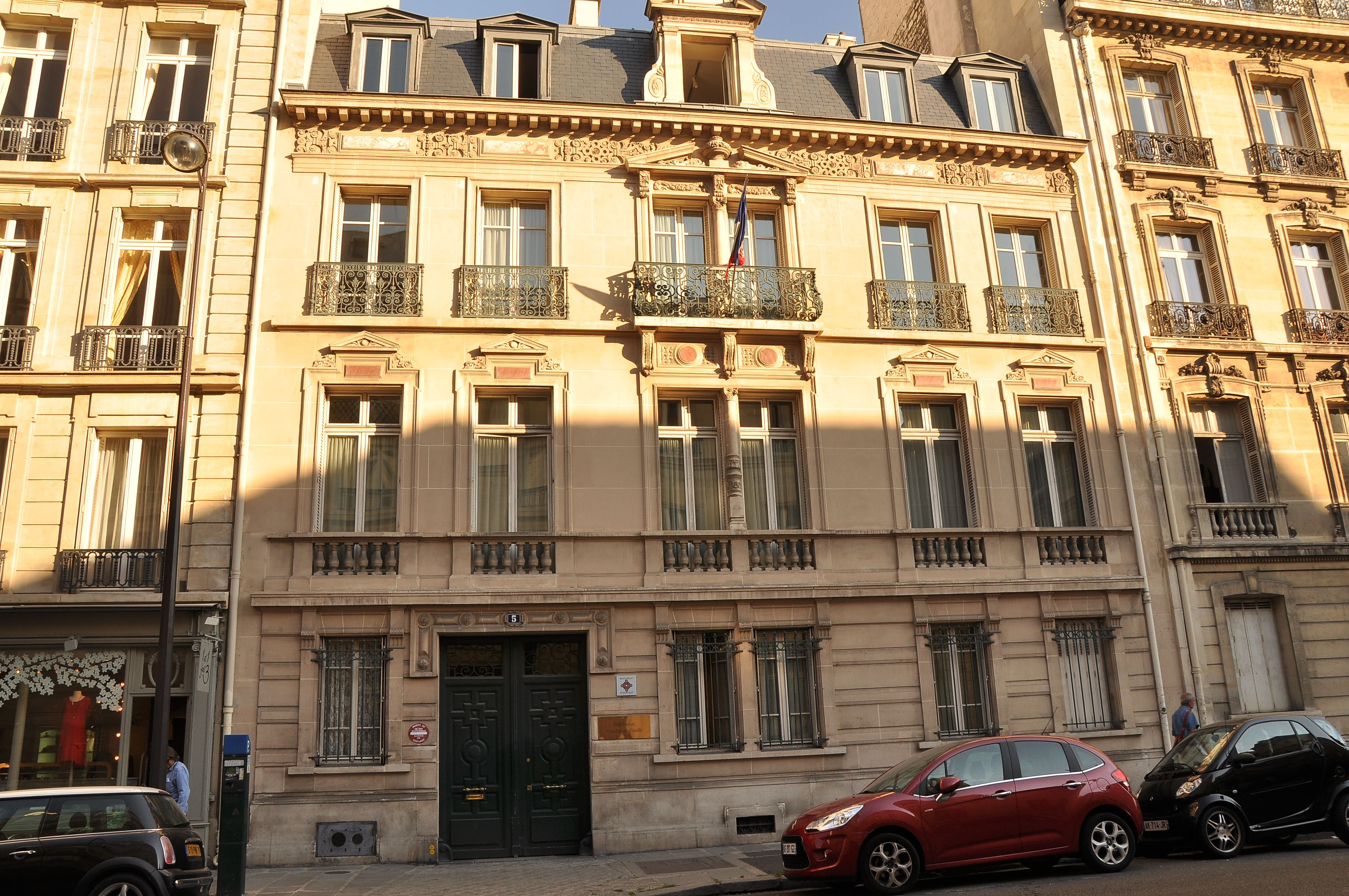
Charles de Gaulle Foundation headquarters in Paris

The Charles de Gaulle Foundation (Fondation Charles de Gaulle), previously Institut Charles-de-Gaulle has worked since 1971 to publicize and perpetuate the action of General de Gaulle (1890-1970), leader of Free France at the time of World War II, and President of the French Republic from 1959 to 1969.

The foundation organizes conferences with academics and witnesses of the time, and conferences intended for a less specialized audience.

It publishes the periodical magazine Espoir.

It manages the birthplace of Charles de Gaulle in Lille and the Domaine de la Boisserie, his former residence in Colombey-les-Deux-Églises.

The foundation helped create:

- the Historial Charles de Gaulle at the Army Museum in Paris;
- the Mémorial Charles-de-Gaulle in Colombey.

A specialized library and an archive are available to researchers and students in its research and documentation center.
