= Fondation du patrimoine =

Non-profit organization to safeguard and promote local French heritage

- Fondation du patrimoine
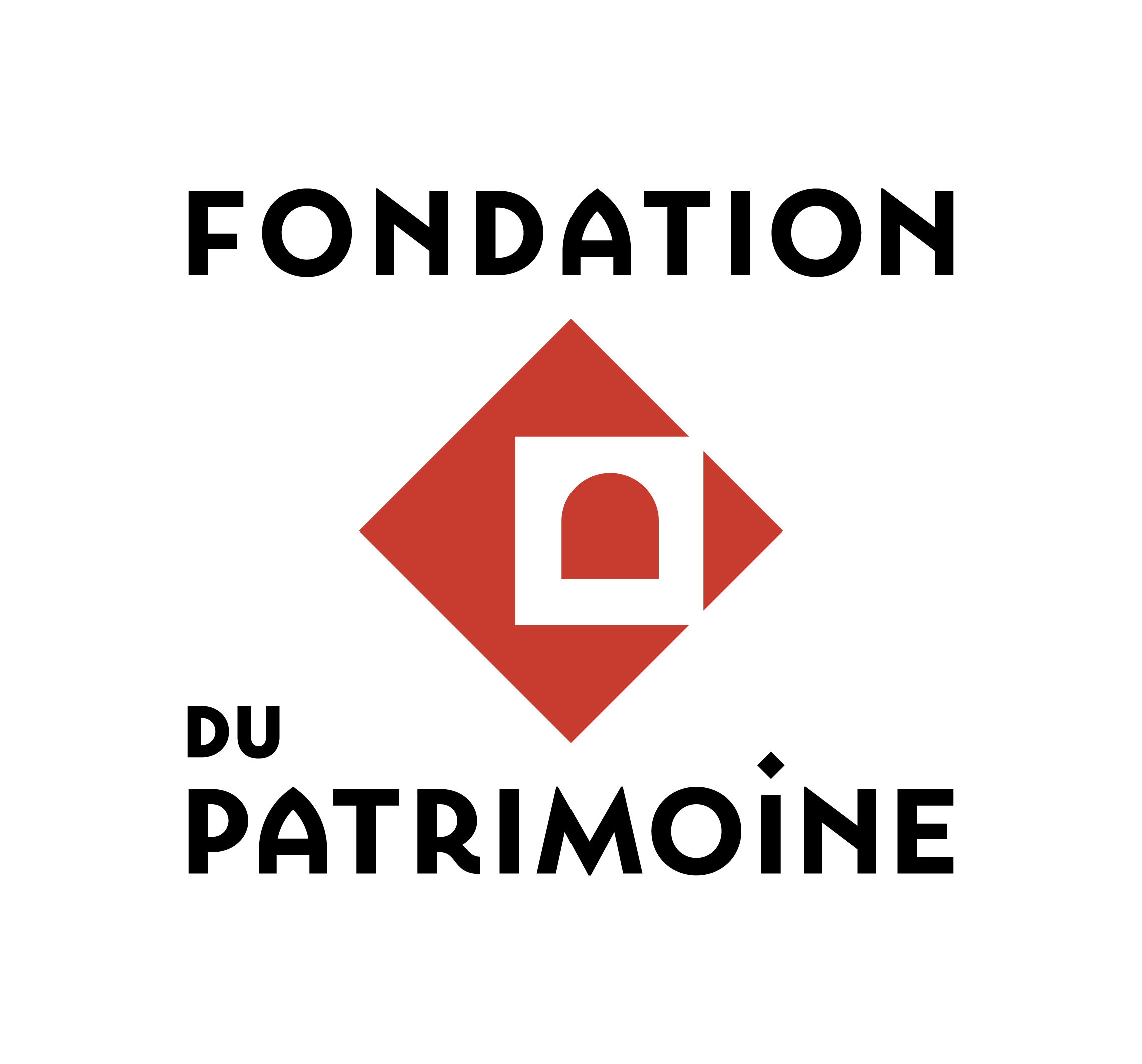
- Fondation du patrimoine logo (2020~)
- Type: Nonprofit
- Legal status: Foundation
- Purpose: Cultural heritage
- Headquarters: Neuilly-sur-Seine (Île-de-France)
- Location: France
- Coordinates: 48°52′59″N 2°15′55″E
- Official language: French
- President: Guillaume Poitrinal
- General Manager: Alexandre Giuglaris
- Subsidiaries: Fondation Culturespaces, Fondation VMF pour le rayonnement et la sauvegarde du patrimoine
- Budget: 115 M€ EUR in 2023
- Staff: 75 (2021)
- Volunteers: 800 (2021)
- Website: https://www.fondation-patrimoine.org/

The Fondation du patrimoine, created by the law of July 2, 1996, is a French private, independent, non-profit organization whose mission is to safeguard and promote local French heritage.

Organized into regional delegations staffed mainly by volunteers, it supports heritage restoration projects by promoting their financing.

To this end, it has been delegated by the State to grant a label that enables owners carrying out work to benefit from significant tax deductions, it organizes participative financing and corporate sponsorship operations, and receives part of the proceeds from the heritage lottery.

== History ==
=== Origin ===
In January 1994, the senator and mayor of Saumur, Jean-Paul Hugot, submitted a report to Jacques Toubon, Minister of Culture and Francophonie, entitled Conditions de création d'une fondation du patrimoine français, in which he advocated the creation of a structure that could mobilize private-sector players (companies and individuals) in support of heritage. The report was inspired by the British National Trust model.

The Fondation du patrimoine was created by the law of July 2, 1996. At the time, it was chaired by Édouard de Royère, former head of the Air Liquide group.

It was recognized as a public utility organization by decree on April 18, 1997.

=== Presidents ===
- 1996-2005: Édouard de Royère
- 2005-2017: Charles de Croisset
- Since 2017: Guillaume Poitrinal

== Mission ==
The French government has entrusted the Fondation du patrimoine with the mission of promoting the preservation and enhancement of local heritage, i.e. rural heritage (typical houses, mills, washhouses, etc.), religious heritage (churches, chapels, etc.) and industrial heritage (emblematic old factories, etc.). In most cases, the latter is neither classified (national interest) nor listed (regional interest), and is therefore not protected.

It identifies buildings and sites threatened by deterioration or disappearance, raises awareness of the need for restoration among local players, and helps finance projects (mobilizing the various players, granting the label, raising funds through sponsorship, public collection, or direct financing).

== Action ==
=== Methods of action ===
==== Label ====
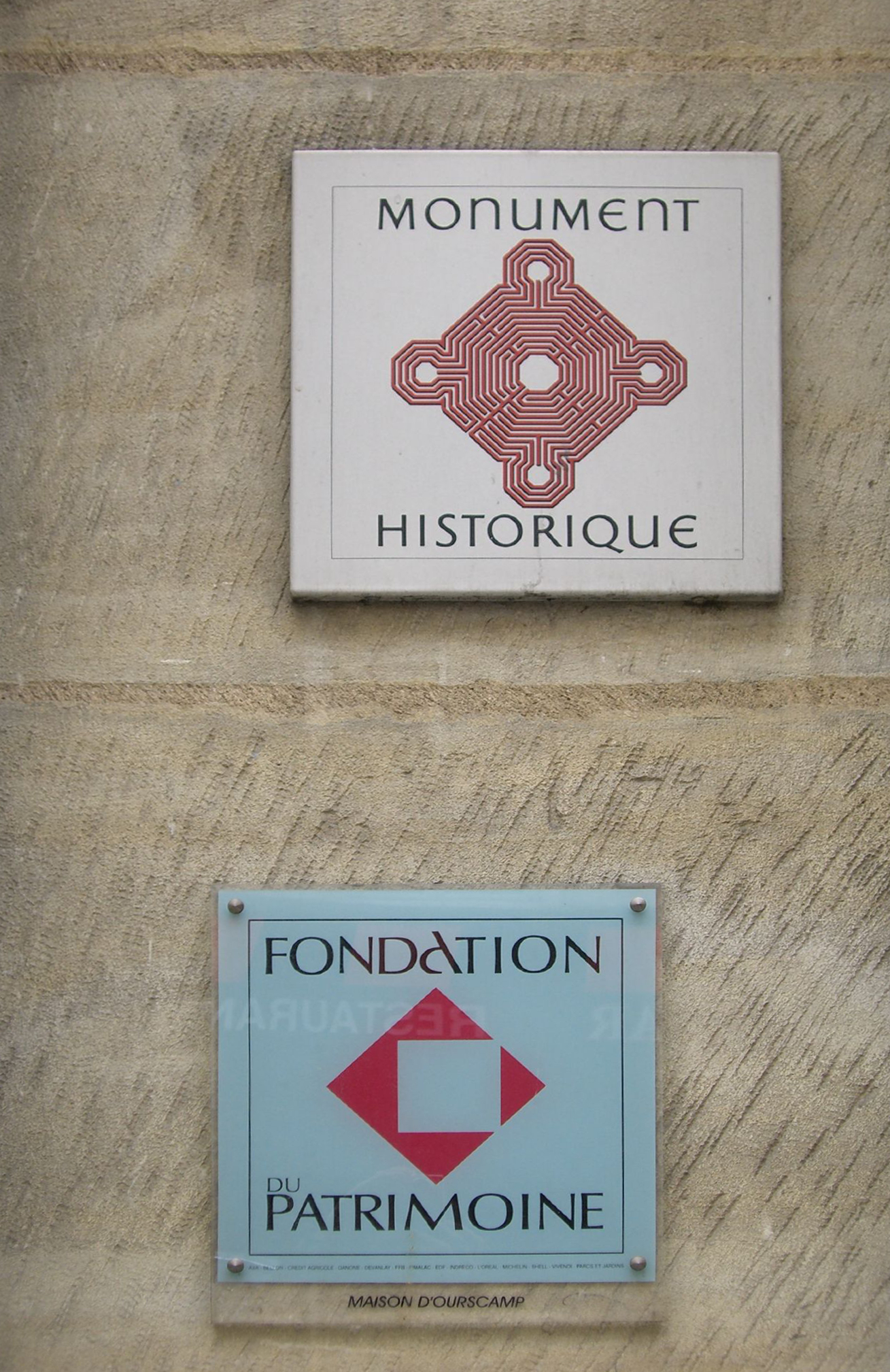
Fondation du patrimoine plaque on the façade of the Hôtel d'Ourscamp, Paris

Under the law of July 2, 1996, the Fondation du patrimoine is authorized to award a label to work carried out by private owners on buildings not protected as historic monuments (i.e. neither listed nor registered). The label entitles the owner to significant tax deductions, ranging from half to the full cost of the work. The work must concern the exterior parts of buildings visible from the public highway. The application for the label is examined by the Foundation's project managers, then validated by the Foundation's regional delegate, and must be approved by the departmental architecture and heritage unit headed by the architects of the buildings of France.

The aim of the “Fondation du patrimoine” label is to encourage private owners of unprotected heritage to carry out restoration work. This mechanism has two advantages: it encourages restoration work to be carried out using period techniques and materials, which is generally more expensive for the owner, and it promotes the preservation of non-inhabitable properties for which a private owner has little interest in spending money.

==== Participative financing or public fundraising ====
The Fondation du patrimoine launches public fundraising campaigns, calling for donations to finance projects to safeguard public and associative heritage. Donations collected through these crowdfunding campaigns are earmarked for a specific project. Donations are eligible for tax deductions.

==== Mobilizing corporate sponsorship ====
National and local sponsorship agreements are signed with companies to finance projects to safeguard and enhance local heritage. Since 2006, the leading corporate sponsor has been the Total Foundation. Corporate philanthropy can take the form of financial, in-kind or skills sponsorship, and is eligible for tax benefits.

Patrons' clubs have been launched to unite companies around local projects. Today, some 30 clubs bring together 250 companies throughout France, who collectively represent the Fondation du patrimoine's second-largest sponsor. The first patron club was founded in 2010, bringing together a number of companies committed to safeguarding the heritage of the Royal Logis of the Château d'Angers in Maine-et-Loire.

==== Open letter ====
In 2016, these eleven leading associations dedicated to safeguarding France's heritage are sharing their experience and forward-looking analysis with the French people and their elected representatives. In an open letter published in 1996 in the form of a book, they put forward twenty-two proposals for improved governance, simplified transmission and economic and sustainable management of heritage. (Note: Association Nationale des Villes et Pays d'Art et d'Histoire and the Cities with Protected and Safeguarded Areas - Ateliers d'art de France - La Demeure Historique - Féderation Française des Sociétés d'Amis de Musées Fédération française des sociétés d'amis de musées - Fondation du patrimoine - Maisons paysannes de France - Patrimoine-Environnement - Fondation pour la sauvegarde de l'art français - Sites et Monuments - Union Rempart - Vieilles maisons françaises, are the eleven associations that have signed: Lettre ouverte aux Français et à leurs élus sur le Patrimoine [Open letter to the French and their elected representatives on Heritage] (in French), Paris: Éditions Michel de Maule, 2016)

==== Mission Stéphane Bern ====
Mission Stéphane Bern
- Type of project: Government program
- Country: France
- Established: 16 September 2017
- Website: https://www.missionbern.fr/

The Fondation du patrimoine is the operator of the heritage preservation mission entrusted to Stéphane Bern by the President of the Republic in September 2017. In particular, it provides support in identifying endangered monuments and finding financing solutions.

In the first phase of the operation, more than 2,000 monuments were flagged by participatory approach on the digital platform of the Fondation du patrimoine and the Ministry of Culture. On May 31, 2018, the second phase was presented at the Élysée Palace, during which 269 priority projects, including 18 emblematic ones, were unveiled, spread throughout France (metropolitan and overseas).

To mark the occasion, a heritage lottery was launched, with part of the proceeds going to the Fondation du patrimoine. The proceeds of the lottery enabled the Foundation to rapidly finance the first stage of restoration work on 18 emblematic projects. Priority projects are financed by a variable amount of the proceeds from the games, using participatory financing and corporate sponsorship.

==== Portail du patrimoine ====
Portail du patrimoine logo

In 2021, the Fondation du patrimoine launched the Portail du patrimoine.

This information site, dedicated to heritage and the challenges of restoring it, provides owners with a variety of content to help them carry out their restoration projects. The site deals with various themes related to heritage:

- Help and Financing
- Culture and Heritage
- Heritage actors
- Communication and Mobilization
- Promoting heritage
- Heritage projects

=== Fondation du patrimoine's emblematic projects ===
Among the emblematic sites supported by the Fondation du patrimoine are the Charles-de-Gaulle memorial at Colombey-les-Deux-Églises, Reims Cathedral, the Château de Lunéville, the new church at Oradour-sur-Glane and the sets of the Théâtre national de Chaillot.

Considering the extent of the damage caused to Notre-Dame Cathedral in Paris by the fire on April 15, 2019, which destroyed its roof, 13th-century framework and spire, the Fondation du patrimoine has opened an exceptional fund-raising campaign for the restoration of this edifice.

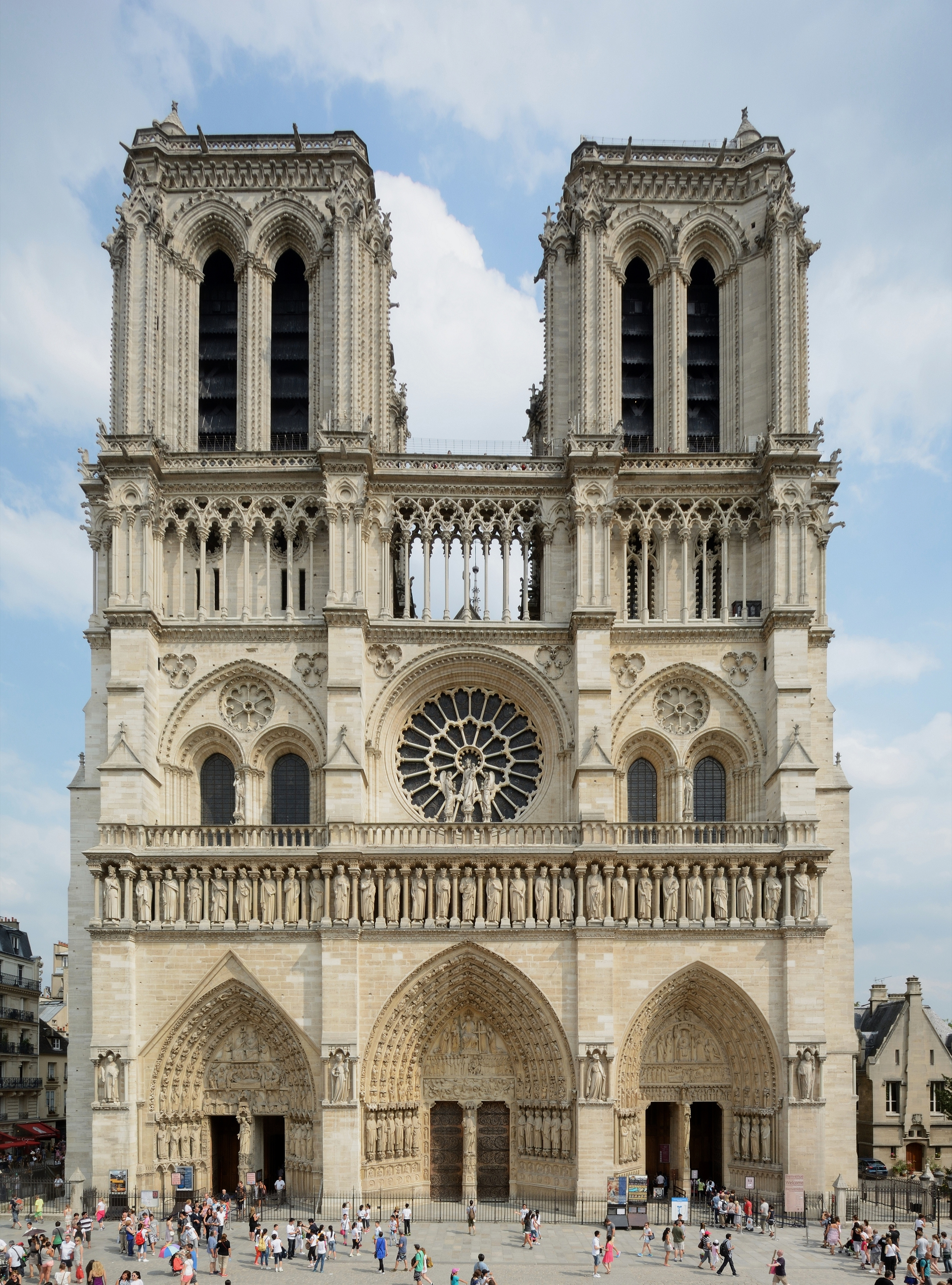
Cathédrale Notre-Dame de Paris

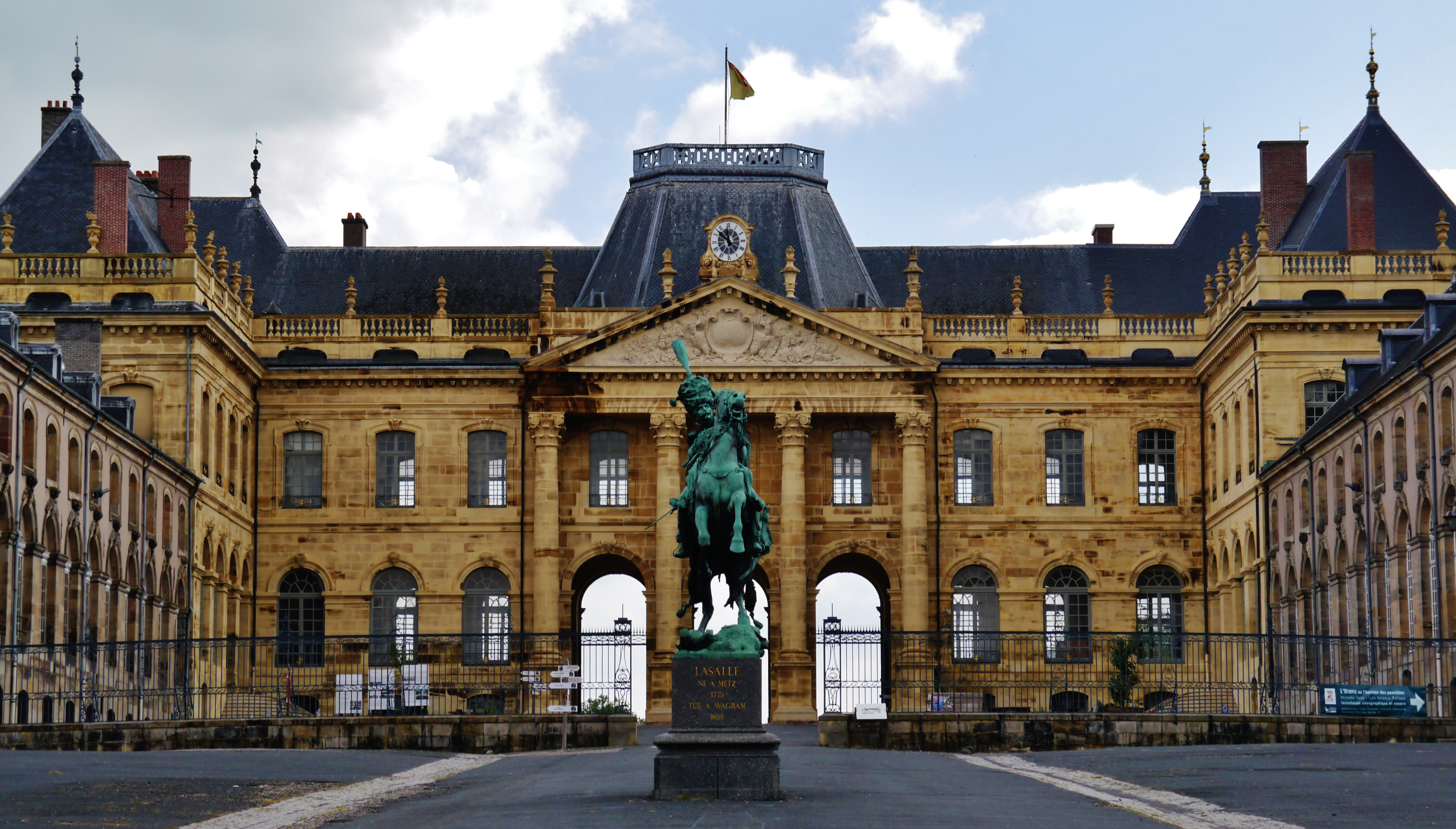
Château de Lunéville

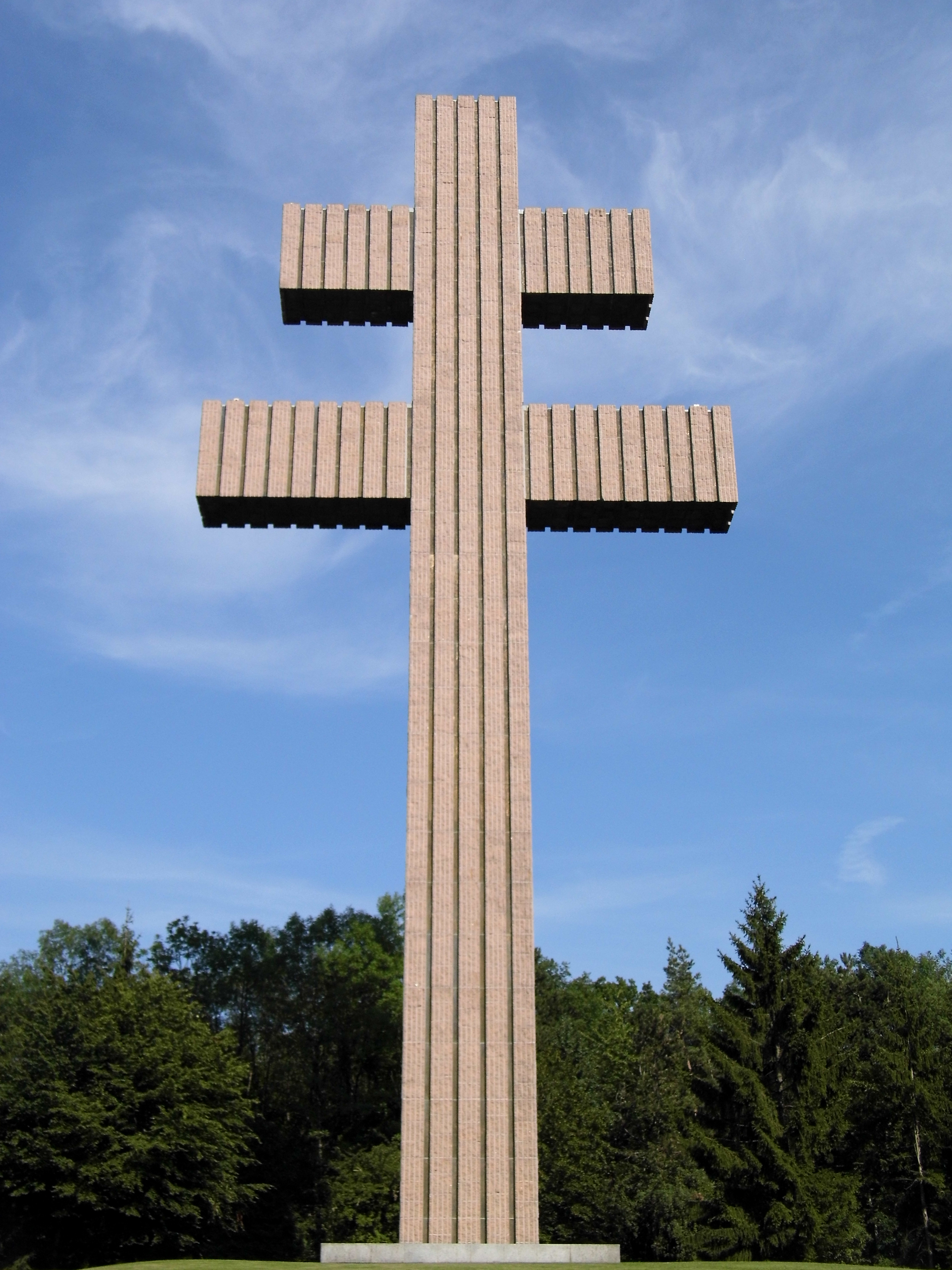
Charles-de-Gaulle Memorial

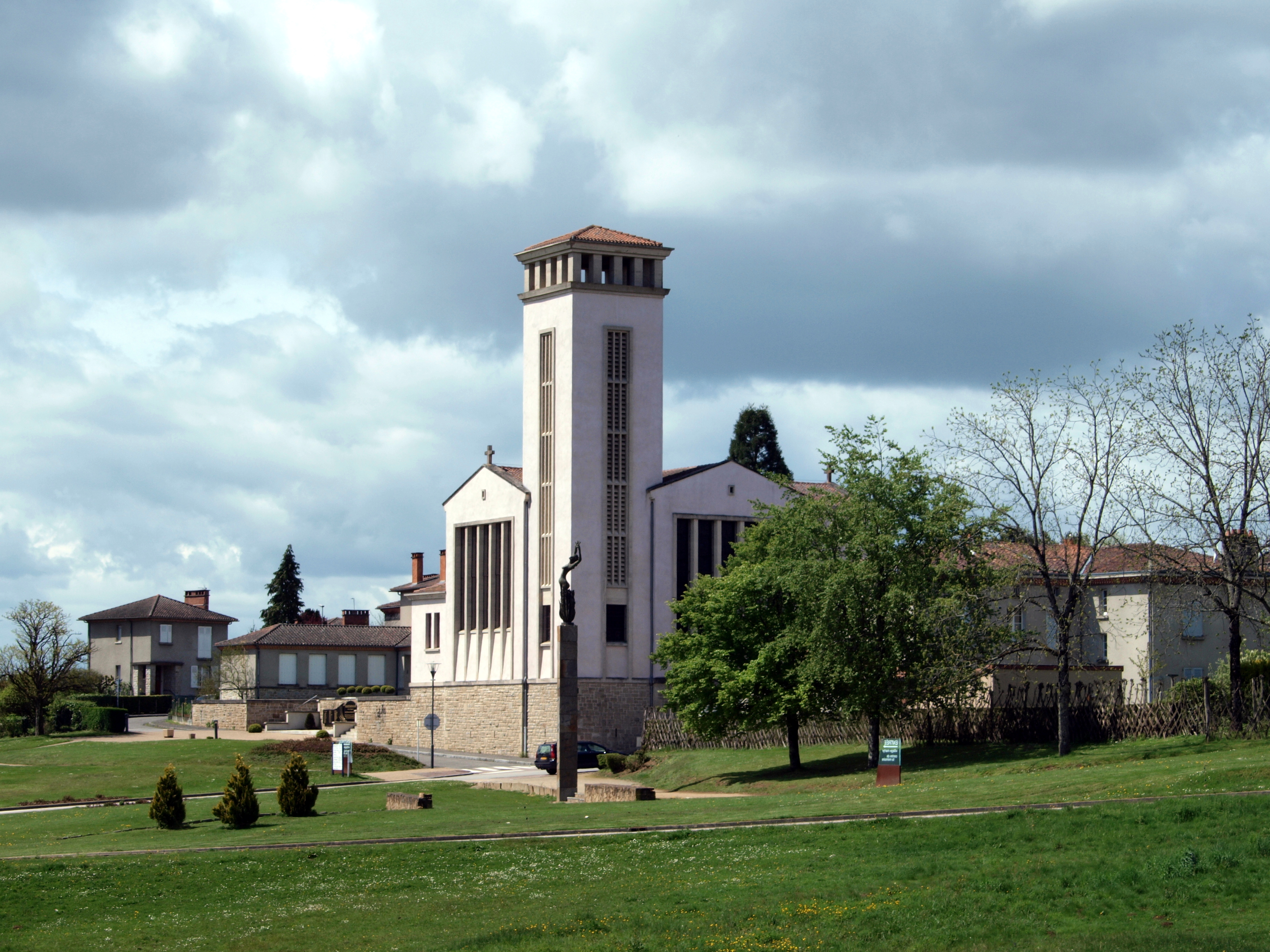
Saint-Martin d'Oradour new church

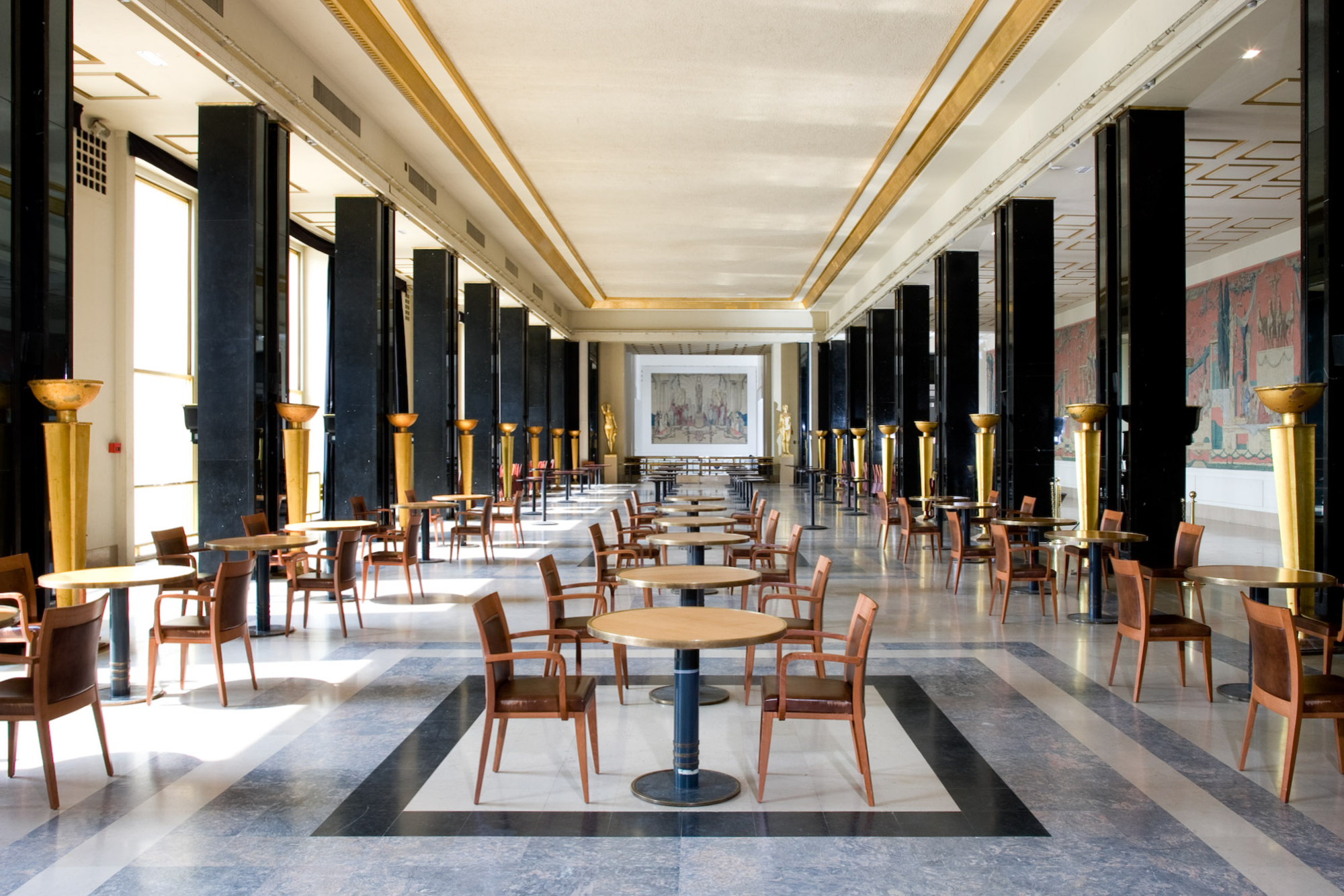
Décor for the Théâtre national de Chaillot

=== Specific programs ===
==== Patrimoine Naturel et Biodiversité program ====
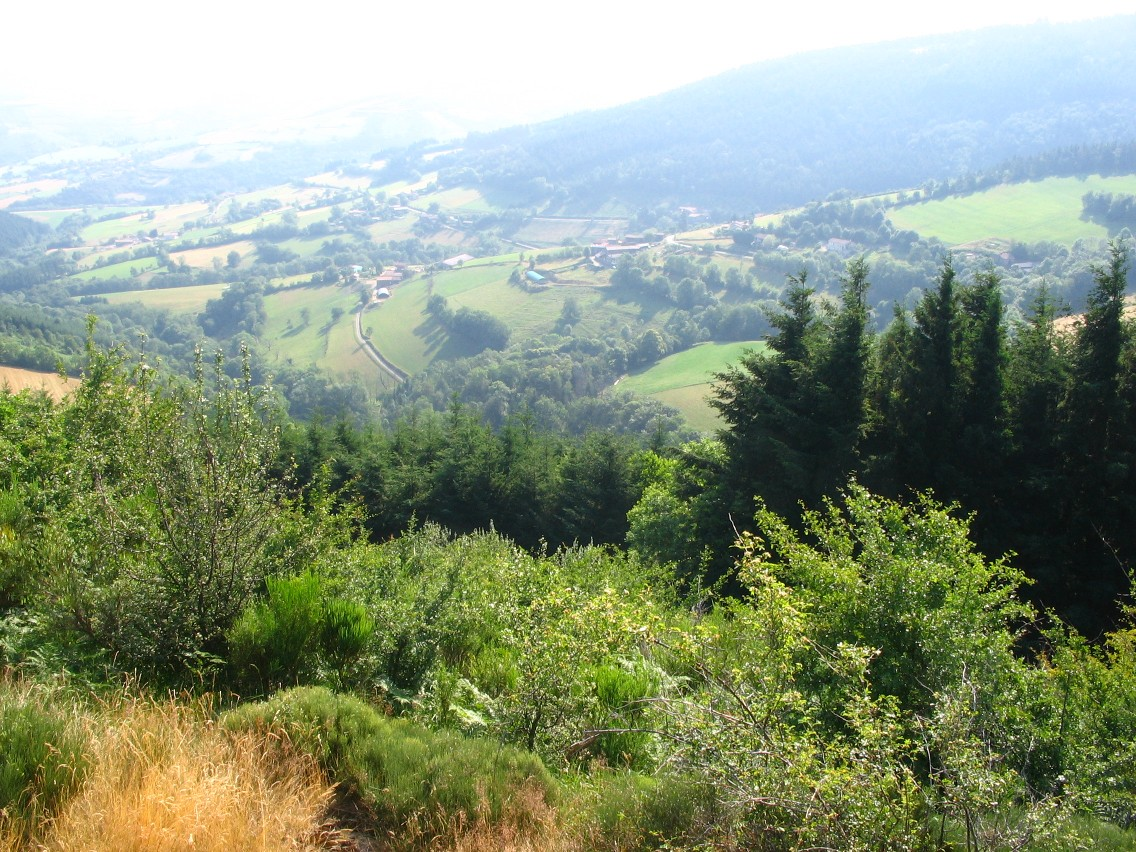
Pilat Regional Natural Park, restoration of the Sapia river

As part of its mission, the Fondation du patrimoine develops actions in favor of natural heritage to enhance biodiversity and rehabilitate sensitive natural areas. These actions give priority to projects that integrate built heritage as a complementary element of an environment, landscape, or biotope.

Through the Natural Heritage program, the Fondation provides financial assistance for projects located in sensitive natural areas and remarkable coastal areas governed by the French urban planning code, areas protected or recognized under the French environmental code (national parks, nature reserves, regional nature parks, sites classified under the law of May 1930, areas classified for biotope protection, “Nature 2000” areas and conservatory land), and type I and II natural areas of ecological, faunistic and floristic interest.

==== Patrimoine Emploi program ====
Through its Patrimoine Emploi program, the Fondation contributes to training in heritage professions and to the social and professional integration of people in difficulty. It provides financial support for projects to preserve or enhance built heritage, carried out as part of integration projects for disadvantaged groups (unemployed young people, people in prison, the long-term unemployed, etc.), and for heritage training programs organized by schools, training centers, “chantiers écoles”, approved structures or specialized associations such as Union Rempart, Acta Vista or the Medieval History and Architecture Workshop (Chantiers Histoire et Architecture Médiévales - CHAM) association.

==== Jewish Heritage Program ====
Through its Jewish Heritage program, established in partnership and with the support of the Edmond J. Safra Foundation, the foundation contributes to preserving and restoring the diverse, ancient, and often overlooked historical heritage of the Jews of France. The renovation of the Great Consistorial Synagogue of Metz, started in 2023 and completed in 2025, is the first project to benefit from this program.

In 2026, the Synagogues of Nantes, Toul, Colmar, Elbeuf, the Jewish cemetery of Belfort and the Beaucaire building in L'Isle-sur-la-Sorgue also benefited from this program through restoration and renovation projects.

== Organization ==
=== A decentralized organization ===
The Foundation's activities were supported, in 2023, by a network of 977 volunteers and 89 employees. This local network is made up of 22 regional delegations in metropolitan and overseas France. The national head office is located in Neuilly-sur-Seine and employs 45 people.

The Fondation du patrimoine is a decentralized organization whose driving force in the regions is the regional delegate. This volunteer guides the departmental teams, negotiates with the political and economic environment, and brings with them a network of contacts and stakeholders.

The Fondation du patrimoine's Board of Directors is made up of representatives of the founding private organizations, national and local public institutions, the French government and its members.

Staff by year
Year	Volunteers	Employees	Sources
2014	500	60	
2016	598	65	
2017	566	70	
2019	610	74	
2020	690	77	
2021	803	80	
2022	903	85	
2023	977	89	

=== A distinctive legal structure ===
The Fondation du patrimoine is both an allocation of assets and a group of individuals.

Built on the model of foundations recognized as being of public utility under the decree of April 18, 1997, its statutes were laid down by Parliament. The French State is represented on the Board of Directors by three non-voting government commissioners. Nevertheless, the law provides for statutes that partly depart from the standard statutes for organizations recognized as being in the public interest, approved by decree by the Conseil d'Etat. The founding companies have the majority of votes on the Board of Directors of the Fondation du patrimoine. In addition, the Foundation's articles of association provide for membership by individuals or legal entities in the same way as for an association.

These specific features are designed to involve the founding companies closely in the running and financing of the foundation, and to attract widespread support from the general public. Influenced by the British National Trust, this status is intended to provide the foundation with substantial resources in the form of contributions, as well as a high profile in public opinion. 18% of French local authorities are members of the Fondation du patrimoine.

The Fondation du patrimoine has the legal capacity to shelter foundations whose purpose is compatible with its missions, such as the VMF Foundation.

By law, the Fondation du patrimoine receives the majority of unclaimed estates (75%), i.e. those without heirs. This amounted to 5.1 million euros in 2017.

=== Personalities associated with the Fondation du patrimoine ===
- Stéphane Bern, radio and TV presenter, and writer, is a collaborator of the Fondation du patrimoine, notably through the Mission Patrimoine.
- Bernard Belloc, economist, university professor, former president of Toulouse Capitole University, advisor to French President Nicolas Sarkozy, is the Fondation du patrimoine's departmental delegate in Tarn-et-Garonne.
- Alain Schmitz, politician, former president of the Yvelines departmental council, was the Fondation du patrimoine's regional delegate for the Île-de-France region from 2016 to 2020.
- Michel Roquejeoffre, French army general, commander of French forces during the Gulf War, was the Fondation du patrimoine's departmental delegate for Ariège until 2014.
- Jean-Paul Hugot, politician, senator from 1992 to 2001, was behind the creation of the Fondation du patrimoine with the report he submitted in 1994 to Culture Minister Jacques Toubon.
- Charles de Croisset, businessman, Vice- President of Goldman Sachs Europe, member of the Inspection générale des finances, was President of the Fondation du patrimoine from 2005 to 2017.
- Dominique Vérien, politician, senator for the Yonne department, in 2019 tabled a bill to modernize the tools and governance of the Fondation du patrimoine.

== Key figures ==
In 2021, the Fondation du patrimoine supported 3189 projects and awarded 1806 labels; it obtained 117.7 million euros, of which 12.6% was from collections, 43.6% from patronage and bequests, 26.6% from the heritage lottery, 6.3% from escheated estates, and the remainder from subsidies from local authorities, subscriptions and financial income.

The heritage lottery, launched in September 2018, has made it possible to distribute 31 million euros in 2021 for heritage preservation.

== Impact study ==
To mark its 25th anniversary (1996-2021), the Fondation du patrimoine has carried out a qualitative and quantitative socio-economic impact study of the projects it supports, in conjunction with a specialist consultancy firm.

The analysis is based on two components:

- a macro-economic assessment of the economic activity and jobs created, through the study of 2,500 projects supported by the Fondation du patrimoine,
- an analysis of 7 case studies and 300 interviews.

=== Impact study results ===
- The Fondation du patrimoine, through its means of intervention, in particular sponsorship and the collection of donations, creates civic commitment and a participative dynamic that stimulates the mobilization of public and private financiers.
- 1 € donated by the Foundation to a heritage restoration project generates €21 in economic spin-offs (economic spin-offs include direct, indirect or induced spin-offs generated during the construction period and, more sustainably, with the operation of the sites). Indeed, the expenditure injected into the local economy helps generate immediate and lasting economic benefits.
- This economic activity supported the creation or maintenance of 15,834 full-time equivalent jobs in 2019.

== Visual identity ==
Former foundation logo

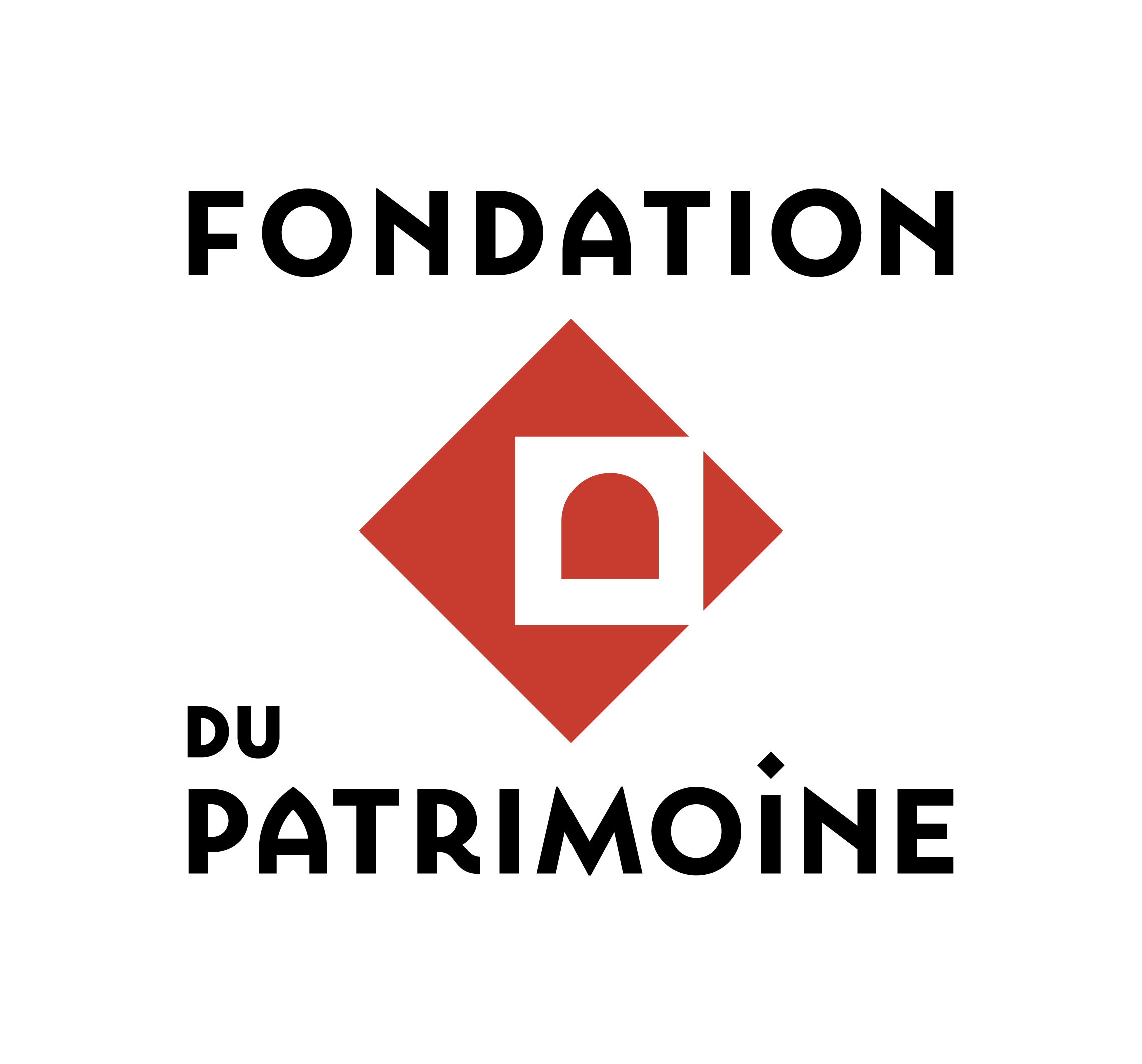
Logo since 2020

== Gallery ==
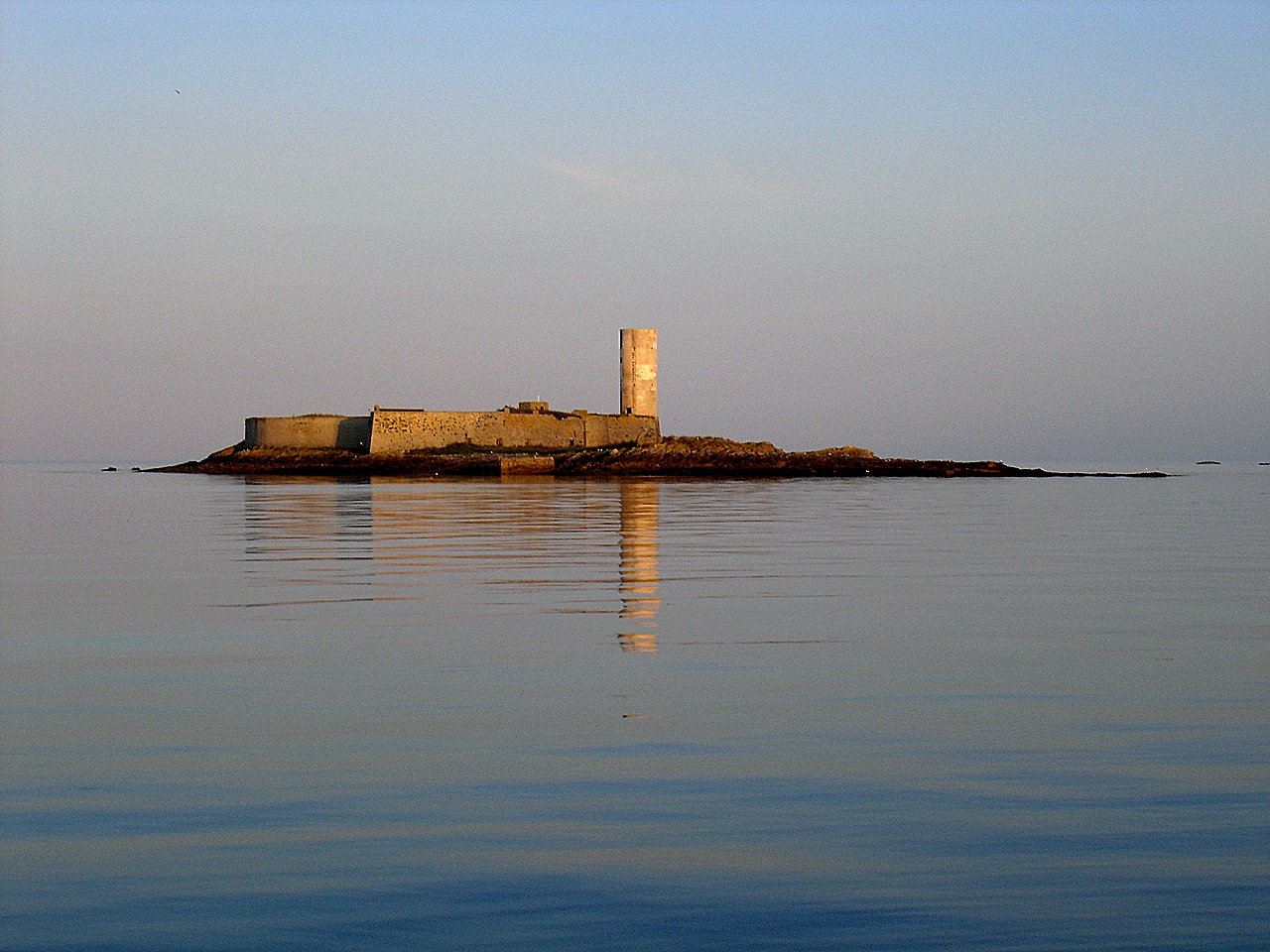
Fort Cigogne - Glénan archipelago

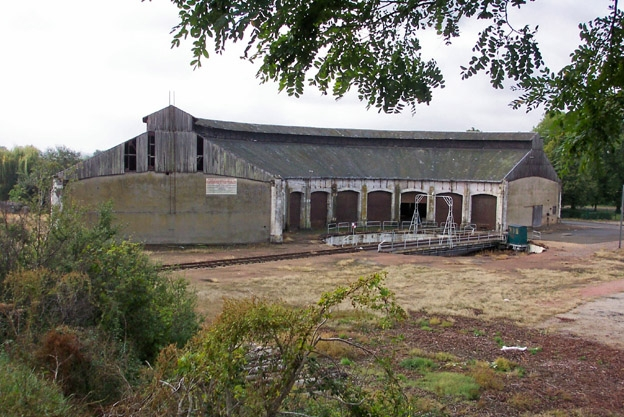
Montabon railway roundabout

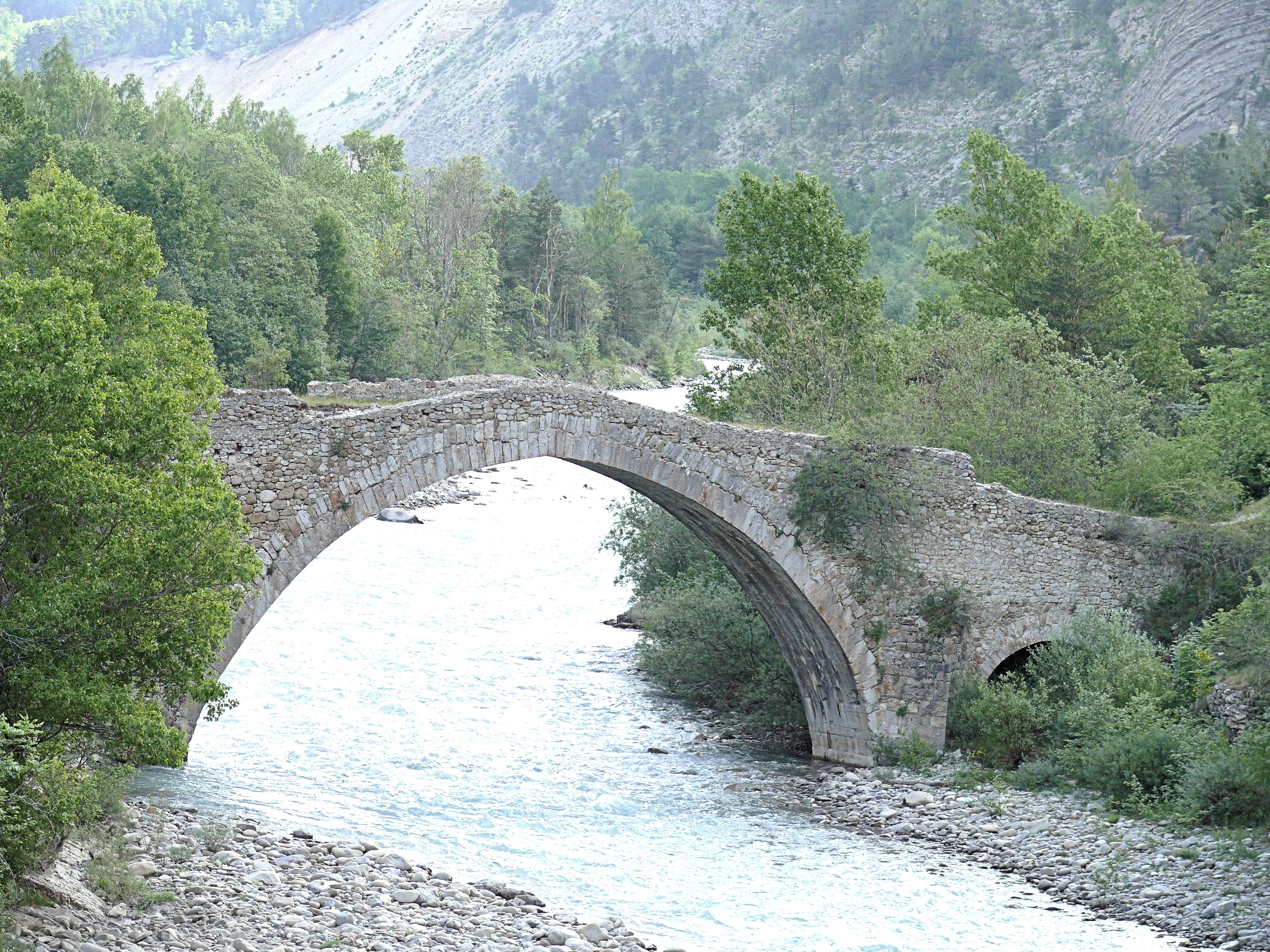
Ondres bridge

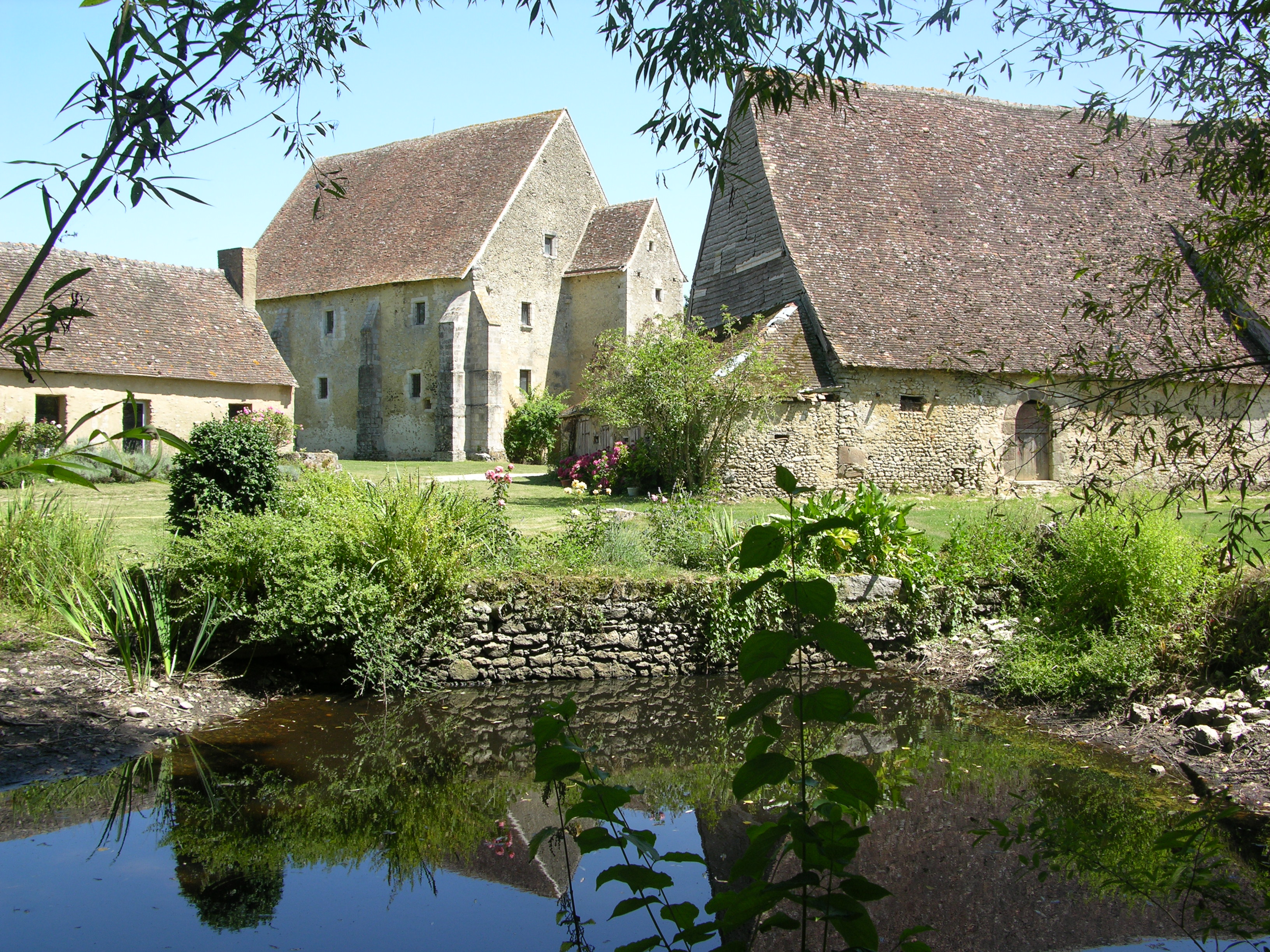
Mayanne Priory

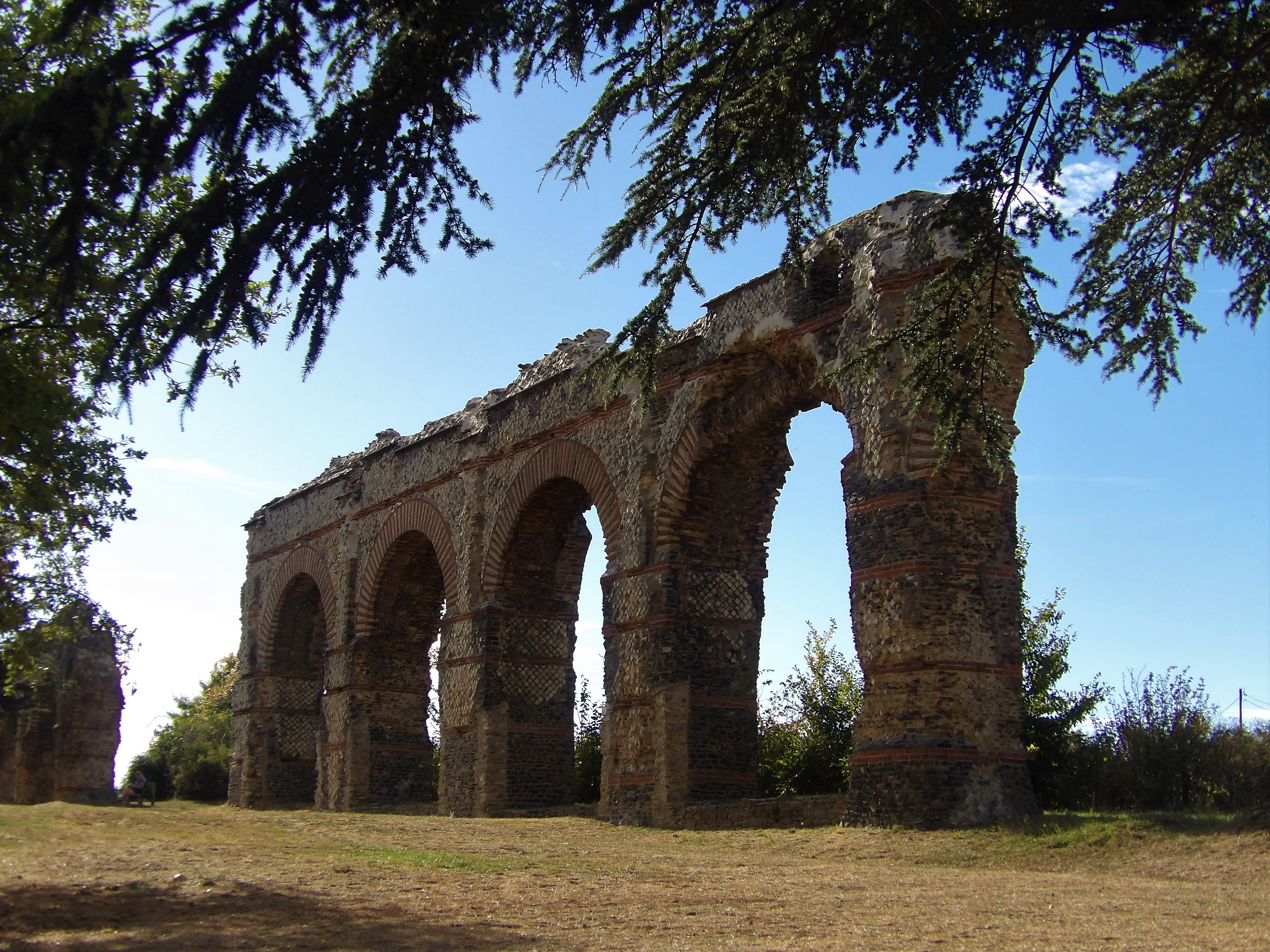
Gier aqueduct

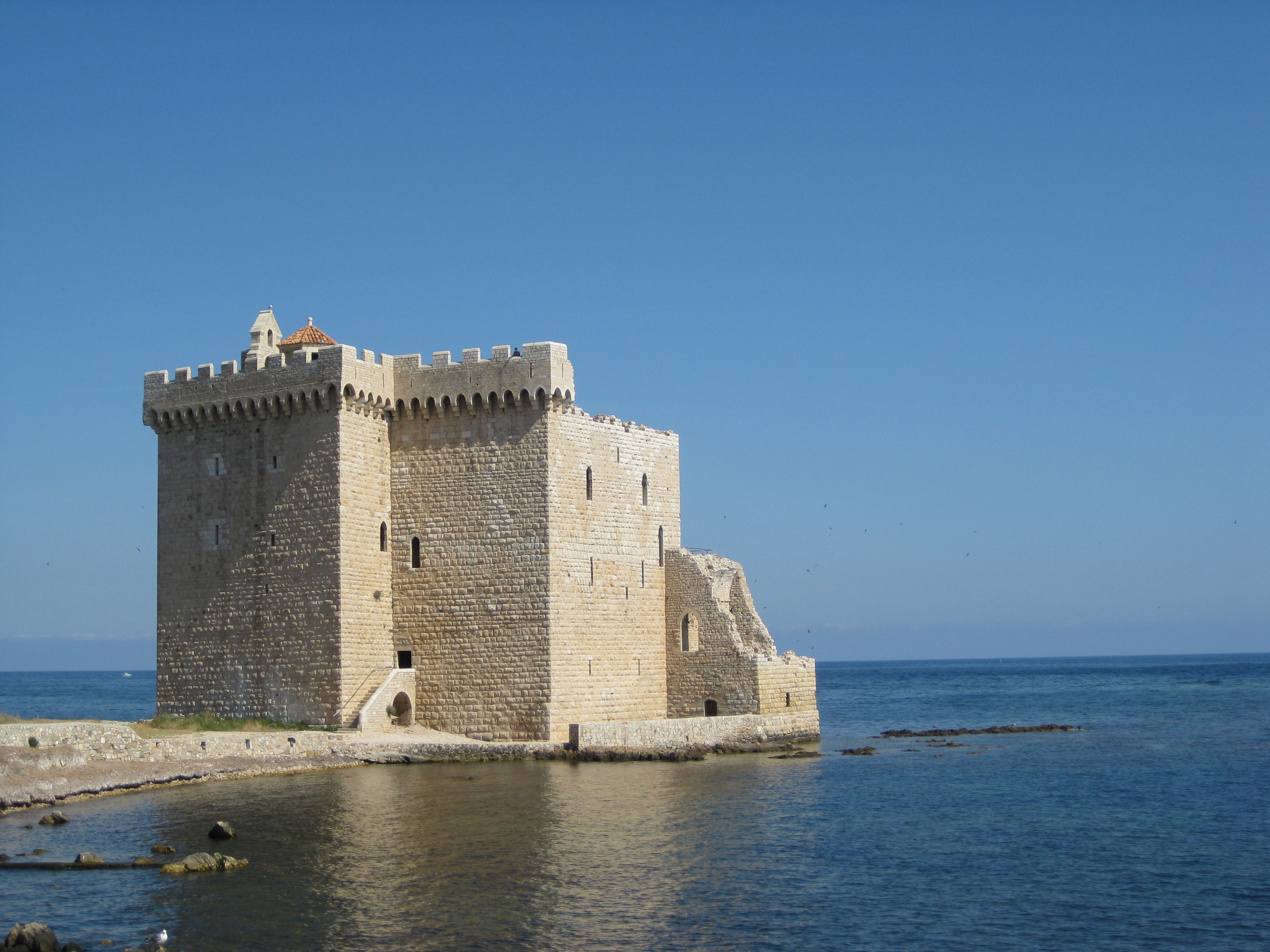
Fortified monastery of Lérins Abbey

== Bibliography ==
- Dinkel, René (1997). "Chapitre XII-4 L'affaire de tous, Le mécénat culturel d'entreprise La Fondation du patrimoine" [Chapter XII-4 Everyone's business, Corporate cultural sponsorship The Fondation du patrimoine]. L'Encyclopédie du patrimoine (Monuments historiques, Patrimoine bâti et naturel - Protection, restauration, réglementation. Doctrines - Techniques : Pratiques) [The Heritage Encyclopedia (“Historic monuments”, “Built and natural heritage” - Protection, restoration, regulations. Doctrines - Techniques : Practices)] (in French). Les Encyclopédies du Patrimoine. pp. 334–345.
- Hugot, Jean-Paul (1994). Conditions de création d'une fondation du patrimoine français : rapport au ministre de la culture et de la francophonie [Conditions for the creation of a French heritage foundation: report to the Minister of Culture and Francophonie] (Report) (in French). Paris.
- Sallavuard, Guy (2016). Le patrimoine, une passion, des hommes: Voyage au cœur de nos régions [Heritage, a passion, people: Journey to the heart of our regions.] (in French). Éditions Autrement. ISBN 978-2-7467-4427-1.
