= List of French Resistance museums and memorials =

French Resistance museums and memorials commemorate people and events associated with the French movements, collectively known as the French Resistance (French: La Résistance) that fought against the Nazi German occupation of France and the collaborationist Vichy régime during the Second World War.

The following is a list of this type of museums and memorials:

== List of museums and memorials ==
- Musée départemental de Résistance et Déportation (Agen)
- Musée de la Résistance et de la Déportation (Charente) (Angoulême)
- Musée de la Résistance d'Anterrieux (Anterrieux)
- Centre de la résistance et de la déportation du Pays d'Arles (Arles)
- The Museum of the Resistance and Deportation (Besançon)
- Musée de la Résistance, de la Déportation et de la Libération du Loir-et-Cher (Blois)
- Musée de la Résistance de Bondues au Fort Lobau (Nord) (Bondues)
- Centre Jean Moulin (Bordeaux)
- Musée de la Résistance et de la Déportation de Bourges et du Cher (Bourges)
- Centre National d'Etudes de la Résistance et de la Déportation Edmond Michelet (Brive-la-Gaillarde)
- Mémorial de Caen (Caen)
- Musée de la Résistance (Castellane)
- Centre régional de la Résistance et de la Déportation de Castelnau-le-Lez (Hérault) (Castelnau-le-Lez)
- Musée du souvenir de Châlons (Marne) (Châlons-en-Champagne)
- Musée de la Résistance, de l'Internement et de la Déportation de Chamalières (Chamalières)
- Museum of National Resistance (Musée de la Résistance nationale) (Champigny-sur-Marne)
- Musée de la Résistance de Châteaubriant-Voves-Rouillé (Châteaubriant)
- Mémorial du Vercors (Vassieux-en-Vercors)
- Mémorial Charles de Gaulle (Colombey-les-Deux-Églises)
- Mémorial de l'internement et de la déportation (Compiègne)
- Musée de la Résistance et de la Déportation (Fargniers)
- Musée Départemental de la Résistance et de la Déportation de Forges-les-Eaux (Forges-les-Eaux)
- Musée de la Résistance, de la Déportation et de la Seconde Guerre mondiale (Frugières-le-Pin)
- Musée de la Résistance et de la Déportation de l'Isère (Grenoble)
- Maison d'Izieu mémorial des enfants juifs exterminés (Izieu)
- Lieu de Mémoire au Chambon-sur-Lignon (Le Chambon-sur-Lignon, Haute-Loire)
- Musée départemental de la Résistance et de la Déportation (Loiret) (Lorris)
- Centre d'histoire de la résistance et de la déportation (Lyon)
- Cèdre Impérial de Meudon (Meudon)
- Musée de la Résistance et de la Déportation (Tarn-et-Garonne) (Montauban)
- Musée Bourbonnais de la Résistance Nationale (Allier) (Montluçon)
- Musée de l'Histoire vivante (Montreuil)
- Musée de la Résistance et de la Déportation (Nantua)
- Musée de la Résistance Henri Queuille (Corrèze) (Neuvic)
- Centre de recherche et d'étude azuréen du Musée de la Résistance Nationale (Nice)
- Centre de la mémoire d'Oradour-sur-Glane, village martyr (Oradour-sur-Glane)
- Mémorial du Maréchal Leclerc de Hauteclocque et de la Libération de Paris et Musée Jean Moulin (Paris)
- Musée de la Résistance (Peyrat-le-Château)
- Musée de la reddition de Reims (Reims)
- Musée pyrénéen de la Résistance et de la Libération, dans l'Ariège (Rimont)
- Centre Historique de la Résistance en Drôme et de la Déportation de Romans (Romans-sur-Isère)
- Musée de la Résistance en Morvan (Saint-Brisson)
- Mémorial de la Résistance et de la Déportation de la Loire (Saint-Étienne)
- Musée de la Résistance bretonne (Saint-Marcel)
- Le Centre européen du Résistant déporté au Struthof (Natzwiller)
- Musée de la Résistance et de la Déportation (Tarbes)
- Musée de la Résistance et de la Déportation de Picardie (Tergnier)
- Musée Départemental de la Résistance (Thônes (La Balme-de-Thuy))
- Centre Régional Résistance et Liberté (Deux-Sèvres) (Thouars)
- Musée départemental de la Résistance et de la Déportation (Toulouse)
- Musée vauzélien de la Résistance Nationale (Nièvre) (Varennes-Vauzelles)
- Musée départemental de la déportation et de l'internement (Varilhes)
- Mémorial de la Résistance (Vassieux-en-Vercors)
- Musée de la Résistance (Rosine Perrier) (Villargondran)

== See also ==
- List of Holocaust memorials and museums in France
