= Historial Charles de Gaulle =

Charles-de-Gaulle historial, France

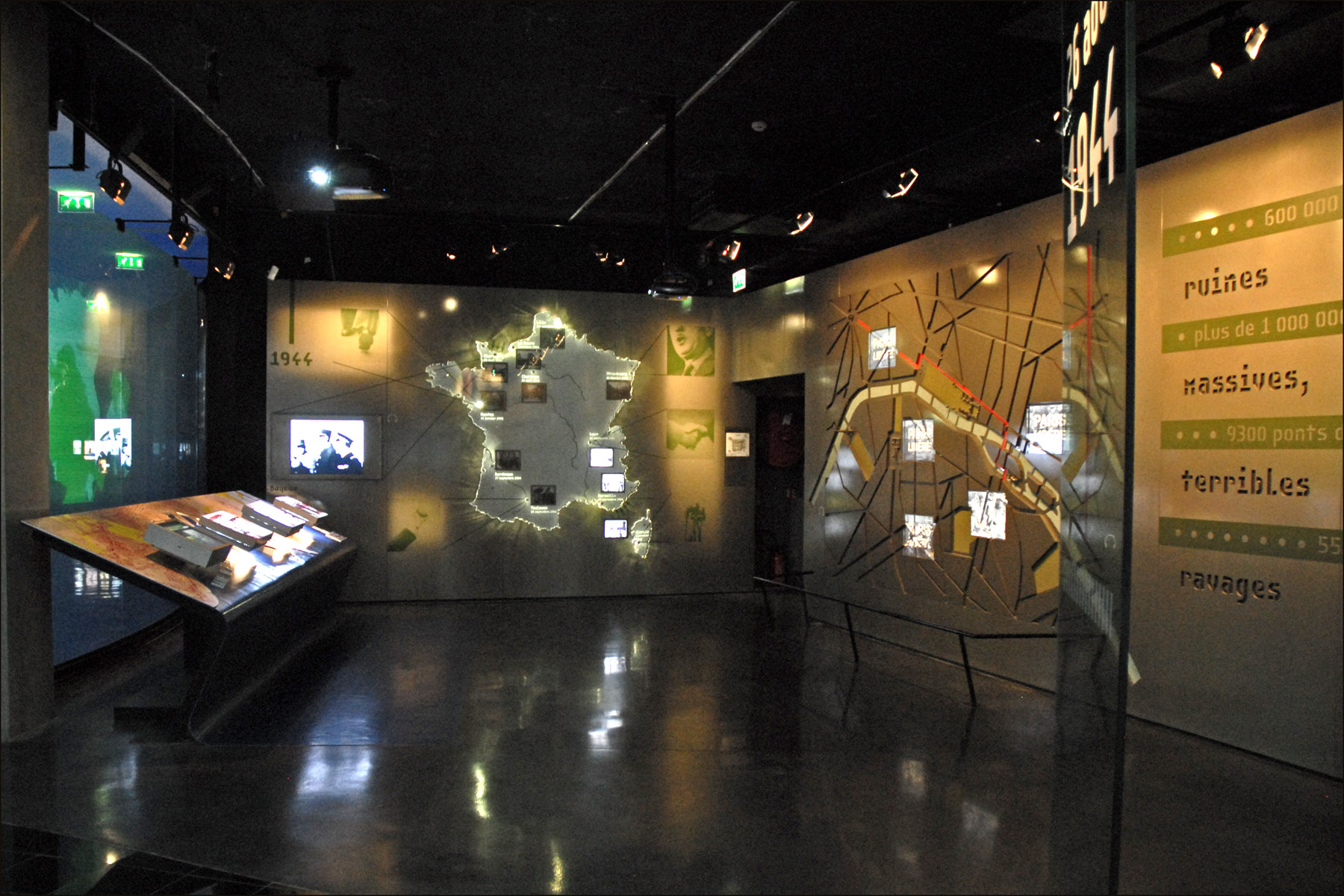
- Historial Charles de Gaulle
- Interactive fullscreen map
- Established: 22 February 2008
- Location: Paris; France
- Coordinates: 48°51′25″N 2°18′46″E
- Type: Museum
- Website: www.musee-armee.fr

The Historial Charles de Gaulle is a French museum located in the Hôtel national des Invalides in the 7th arrondissement of Paris. The Historial aims to present the history of the man of June 18, 1940, General Charles de Gaulle.

== History ==
The absence of a place of Gaullian memory in the capital led the President of the Republic, Jacques Chirac, to launch on November 9, 2004, the project of a Historial in Les Invalides, in connection with the Army Museum. The Hôtel des Invalides was chosen for its prestige, its importance in the History of France, its geography but above all for the available space.

The Historial is part of the modernization program of the Army Museum: ATHENA (Armes, Techniques, Histoire, Emblématique, Nation, Armée) from 2003 to 2009. This program aims to transform the museum from an object into History Museum, drawing on three emblematic figures from the collections: Louis XIV, Napoleon Ier and Charles de Gaulle.

The Museum already has a section in its tour dedicated to the General, but only on his role during the World War II. The creation of the Historial gives a new dimension with a space totally dedicated to Charles de Gaulle, well beyond the world conflict.

The project was launched a year later, on November 9, 2005, the 35th anniversary of the death of Charles de Gaulle. Project management is carried out by the Army Museum and the de Gaulle Foundation, under the supervision of the Ministry of the Armed Forces. As for the realization, it is entrusted to the architects Alain Moatti and Henri Rivière who were selected from several candidates for their proposal to combine contemporary architecture with that of the 17th century.

To build the Historial, major work was necessary: digging 12 meters deep under one of the courtyards of the Hôtel des Invalides. During the work, workers discovered remains of a German bunker dating from the Occupation during the World War II. Bunker which had to be destroyed “man-made” in order not to weaken the structure of the surrounding buildings.

On February 22, 2008, the President of the Republic Nicolas Sarkozy inaugurated the Historial Charles de Gaulle, which officially opened its doors the next day.

The project cost around 18 million euros.
