= Lamothe-en-Blaisy =

- Part of Colombey-les-Deux-Églises
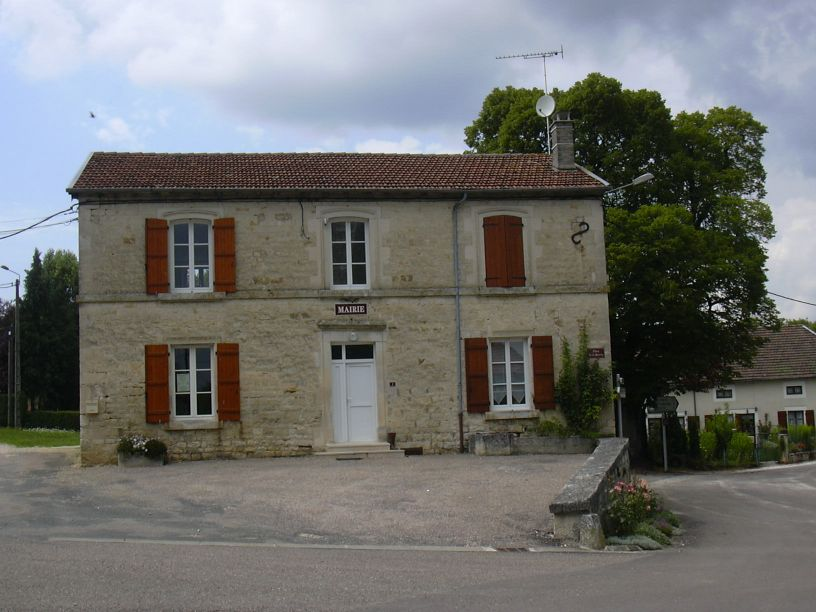
- Lamothe-en-Blaisy Town hall
- Location of Lamothe-en-Blaisy
- Location within France Location within Grand Est
- Coordinates: 48°14′28″N 4°56′43″E
- Country: France
- Region: Grand Est
- Department: Haute-Marne
- Arrondissement: Chaumont
- Canton: Châteauvillain
- Commune: Colombey-les-Deux-Églises
- Area^{1}: 10.21 km^{2} (3.94 sq mi)
- Elevation: 292 m (958 ft)
- Population (2022): 64
  - Density: 6.3/km^{2} (16/sq mi)
- Demonym(s): Lamothois, Lamothoises
- Time zone: UTC+01:00 (CET)
  - Summer (DST): UTC+02:00 (CEST)
- Postal code: 52330
- ^{1} French Land Register data, which excludes lakes, ponds, glaciers > 1 km^{2} (0.386 sq mi or 247 acres) and river estuaries.

Lamothe-en-Blaisy (French pronunciation: [lamɔt ɑ̃ blɛzi]) is a former commune in the Haute-Marne department in north-eastern France. On 1 January 2017, it was merged into the commune Colombey-les-Deux-Églises. Its population was 64 in 2022.

== Geography ==
The Blaise river flows through the commune.

== See also ==
- Communes of the Haute-Marne department
