= Birthplace of Charles de Gaulle =

Charles-de-Gaulle birthplace, France

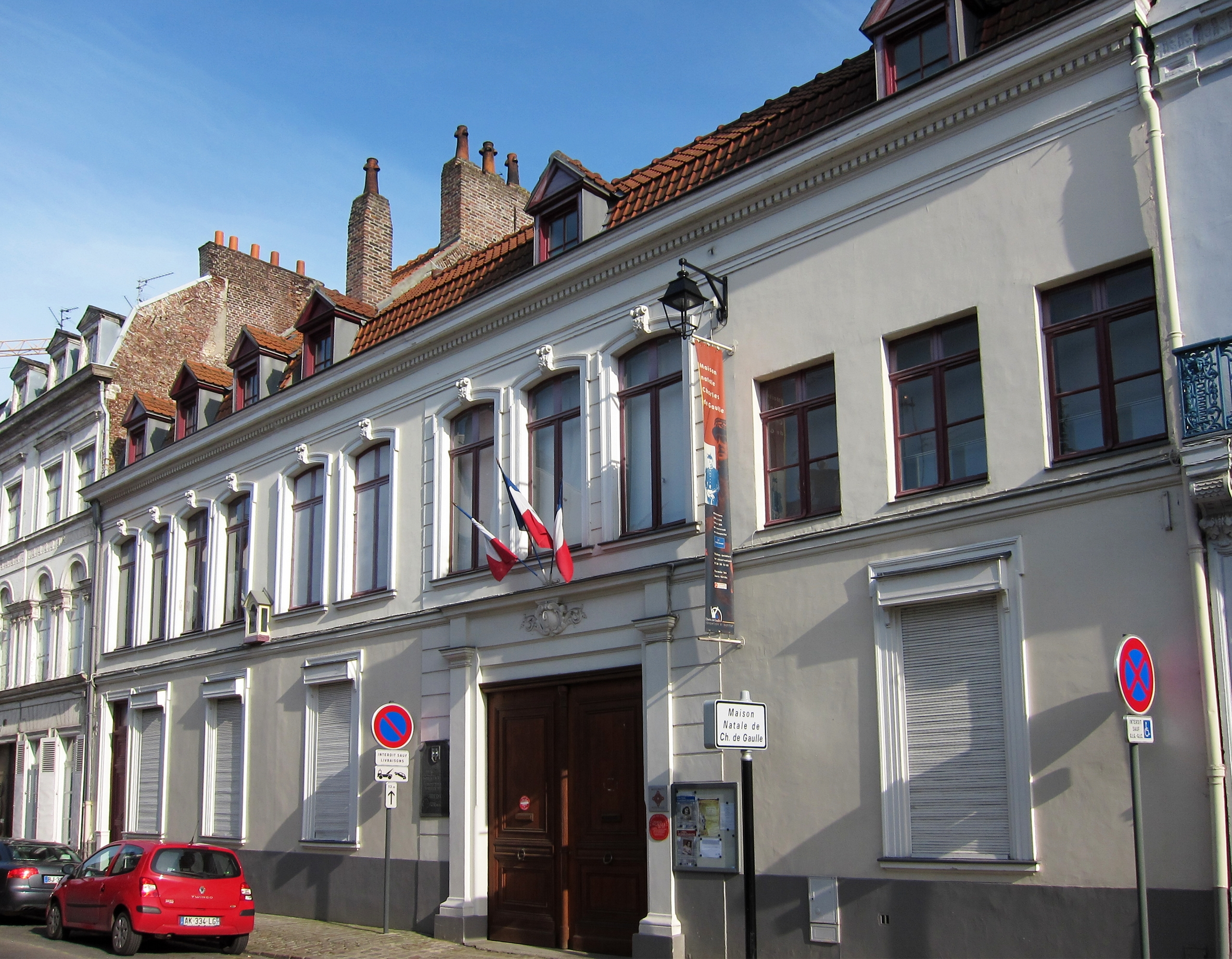
- Birthplace of Charles de Gaulle
- Interactive fullscreen map
- Established: 1983
- Location: Lille; France
- Coordinates: 50°38′46″N 3°03′32″E
- Type: Monument and Museum
- Website: maisondegaulle.fr

The Birthplace of Charles de Gaulle (French: Maison natale de Charles de Gaulle) is a museum in Lille, in the Hauts-de-France, France, which had been Charles de Gaulle's maternal grandparents' house where he was born in 1890.

The museum is property of the Charles-de-Gaulle Foundation, and managed by the Departmental Council of Nord. Opened to the public in 1983, it has been classified as a monument historique since 1989 and obtained the Maisons des Illustres label in 2011. The museum receives between 19,000 and 20,000 visitors each year. It underwent expansion in 2025.
