= Charles de Croisset =

French banker

Personal details
- Born: 28 September 1943 (age 82) New York City, United States
- Education: Sciences Po; École nationale d'administration

Charles Wiener de Croisset (born September 28, 1943, in New York City) is a French banker.

== Biography ==
Charles de Croisset was born on September 28, 1943, in New York City, New York. He was educated at Sciences Po and the École nationale d'administration, holding a bachelor's degree in law. In 1968, de Croisset served as Inspecteur des Finance with the French Finance Ministry and also served as an assistant to the economic adviser of the President of the Republic since 1972. In 1974, he served as member of the Minister's staff at the Ministry of Finance. In 1976, he served at The Ministry of Public Works, Housing and Urban Planning, Transportation. In 1978, he served as chief of staff and an assistant to the minister of industry and energy.

de Croisset joined the Crédit Commercial de France (CCF) SA in 1980, where he served as secretary general and also served as an in charge of all CCF banking activities. In 1983, he served as a senior executive vice president of CCF in charge of international affairs. Since 1986, de Croisset was senior executive vice president of CCF and in charge of the Banking Department. In 1987 he was appointed president of CCF. He served as group executive director of CCF since 1987.

de Croisset rejoined the government in 1987, where he served as the chief of staff of the state minister of economy, Finance and Privatisation. From 1987 to 1988, he served as deputy head of the minister of the economy and Finance's private office.

de Croisset returned to the private sector in 1988, where he served as president and chief operating officer of the Banking Department of CCF. From 1993 he served as chairman of CCF. He served as an executive director of HSBC Holdings PLC since 2000 and served as a director of its subsidiaries, HSBC Bank PLC, from 2000 to February 25, 2004.

Following the takeover of CCF by HSBC, de Croisset has served as vice-chairman of Goldman Sachs Europe, a member of the international advisory board of Goldman Sachs Group, Inc, general treasurer at the Société des amis du Louvre, senior advisor to Bain & Company Consulting, a member of the board of directors of HSBC Guyerzeller Bank S.A. and HSBC Private Holding (Switzerland) S.A, an independent director of Renault SA, a member of the supervisory board of Euler Hermes SA, a member of the supervisory board of Galeries Lafayette SA, a permanent representative of SRRE Luxembourg (HSBC Group) on the board of SOMAREL, an independent director of LVMH Moet Hennessy Louis Vuitton, a director of Thales Group, a director of Bouygues SA/
