= La Boisserie =

Charles-de-Gaulle house, France

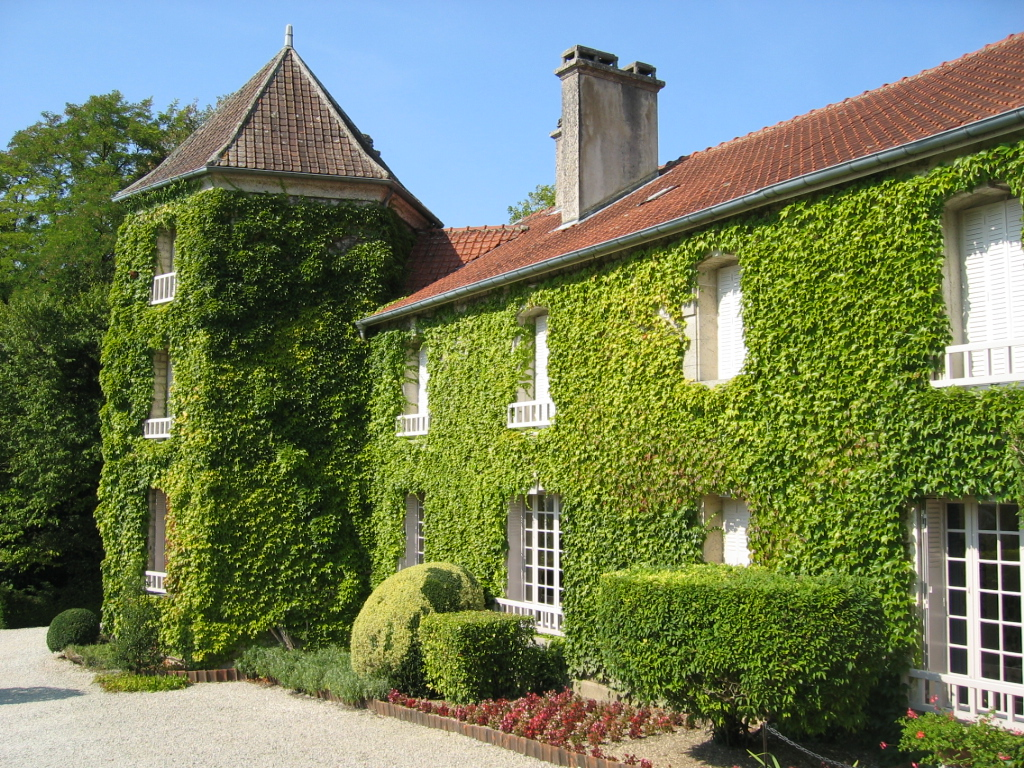
- La Boisserie
- Interactive fullscreen map
- Established: 1810
- Location: Colombey-les-Deux-Églises; France
- Coordinates: 48°13′08″N 4°52′59″E
- Type: Monument and Museum
- Website: charles-de-gaulle.org/les-lieux-gaulliens/la-boisserie/

La Boisserie (French pronunciation: [la bwasʁi], "the woodland glade") is the former personal residence of General Charles de Gaulle, leader of Free France during World War II and the first President of the French Fifth Republic. It is located in Colombey-les-Deux-Églises in the Haute-Marne department of northeastern France, 120 miles (190 km) southeast of Paris. It has been a museum open to the public since 1980, and was owned by the General's only son, Admiral Philippe de Gaulle, until the latter's death in 2024.

De Gaulle liked to come and rest in what he considered to be his true and only home, especially during his political “crossing the desert”. He wrote for example: “I miss Colombey. I can’t see myself living anywhere else.” He took refuge there to make important decisions, in calm and solitude. Even when elected President of the French Republic, he initially refused to stay at the Élysée, contrary to protocol. He ended up living in the presidential palace but continued to spend a lot of time and every other weekend with his family in Colombey. In 1969, de Gaulle resigned and retired to his house with his wife. He died there on November 9, 1970.

Yvonne de Gaulle lived in La Boisserie until 1978, when she left it permanently for Paris, where she entered the retirement home of the Sisters of the Immaculate Conception. She died a year later at the Val-de-Grâce hospital, at the age of 79, on November 8, 1979, the day before the 9th anniversary of her husband's death.

The house and its park, including the fence overlooking the street, are listed as historic monuments by a decree of September 6, 2004.

The residence was labeled Maisons des Illustres in 2011.
