= Mémorial Charles-de-Gaulle =

Charles-de-Gaulle Memorial, France

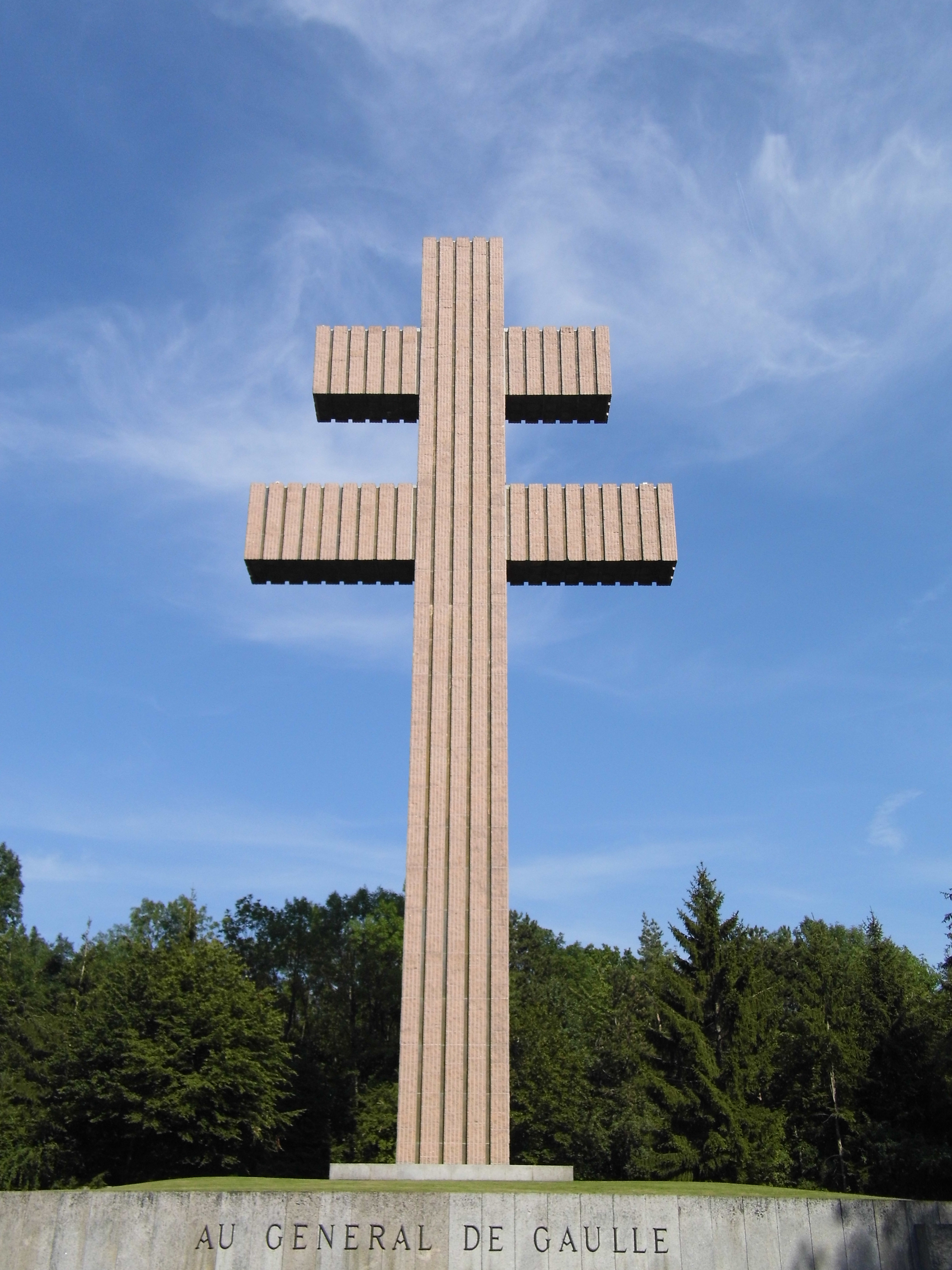
- Cross of Lorraine
- Interactive fullscreen map
- Established: 11 October 2008
- Location: Colombey-les-Deux-Églises; France
- Coordinates: 48°13′N 4°53′E
- Type: Monument
- Website: memorial-charlesdegaulle.fr

The Mémorial Charles-de-Gaulle (French pronunciation: [memɔʁjal ʃaʁl də ɡol], "Charles de Gaulle Memorial") is a monument located in Colombey-les-Deux-Églises in Haute-Marne. Retracing, through the person of Charles de Gaulle (1890–1970), the major historical events of the 20th century, it was produced by the Charles-de-Gaulle foundation and the general council of Haute-Marne at a cost of 22 million euros. It replaces the General de Gaulle memorial inaugurated on June 18, 1972, which until then housed a small exhibition and controlled access to the monumental Cross of Lorraine.

Officially launched by the President of the French Republic Jacques Chirac on November 9, 2006, the Charles-de-Gaulle memorial and its temporary exhibition De Gaulle-Adenauer: a Franco-German reconciliation were inaugurated on October 11, 2008, by Nicolas Sarkozy and the Chancellor Angela Merkel, just fifty years after the historical meeting at La Boisserie between the General and Chancellor Konrad Adenauer.

The Memorial is chaired by Nicolas Lacroix, also President of the Haute-Marne departmental council.
