= Colombey les Deux Églises =

- Commune
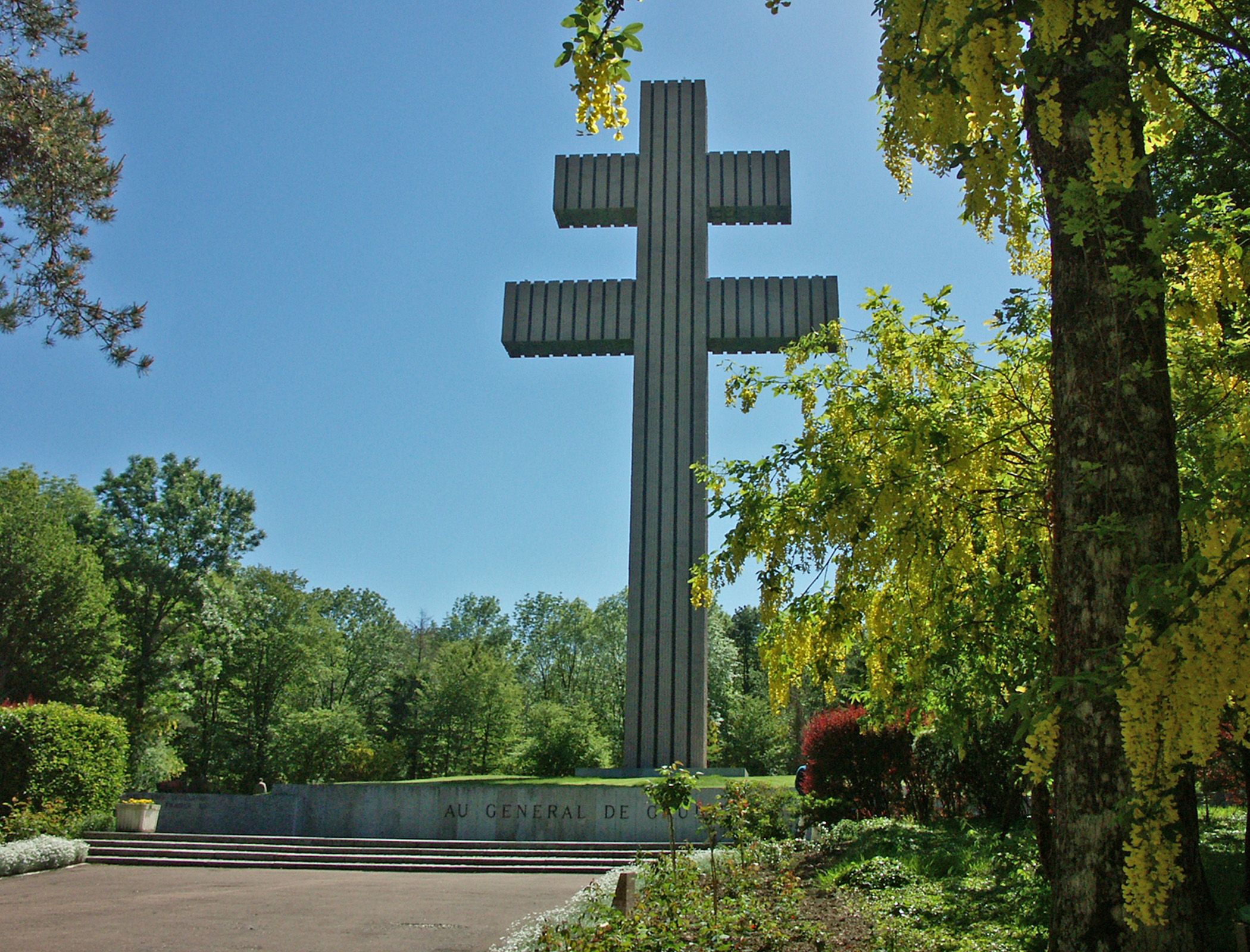
- Charles de Gaulle Monument

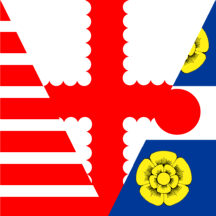
- Flag Coat of arms
- Location of Colombey les Deux Églises
- Location within France Location within Grand Est
- Coordinates: 48°13′27″N 4°53′12″E
- Country: France
- Region: Grand Est
- Department: Haute-Marne
- Arrondissement: Chaumont
- Canton: Châteauvillain
- Intercommunality: CA Chaumont
- Area^{1}: 83.84 km^{2} (32.37 sq mi)
- Elevation: 360 m (1,180 ft)
- Population (2023): 661
  - Density: 7.88/km^{2} (20.4/sq mi)
- Time zone: UTC+01:00 (CET)
  - Summer (DST): UTC+02:00 (CEST)
- INSEE/Postal code: 52140 /52330
- ^{1} French Land Register data, which excludes lakes, ponds, glaciers > 1 km^{2} (0.386 sq mi or 247 acres) and river estuaries.

Colombey les Deux Églises (French pronunciation: [kɔlɔ̃bɛ le døz‿eɡliz], lit. 'Colombey the Two Churches'; before 2017 Colombey-les-Deux-Églises) is a commune in the Haute-Marne department in north-eastern France. It is best known as the home of Charles de Gaulle.

The commune of Colombey-les-Deux-Églises was created administratively in 1793, and it became part of the district of Chaumont and the canton of Blaise. In 1801, under the name Colombey, it passed to the canton Juzennecourt. In January 1973, it absorbed the communes Argentolles, Biernes, Blaise, Champcourt, Harricourt, Pratz and Lavilleneuve-aux-Fresnes. On 1 January 2017, the former commune of Lamothe-en-Blaisy was merged into Colombey-les-Deux-Églises.

Colombey's name means "cemetery", from the Latin colombarium. The "two churches" referenced in the name are the parish church, Notre-Dame-en-son-Assomption, and the pre-revolutionary Cluniac priory of Saint-Jean-Baptiste.

== Charles de Gaulle ==
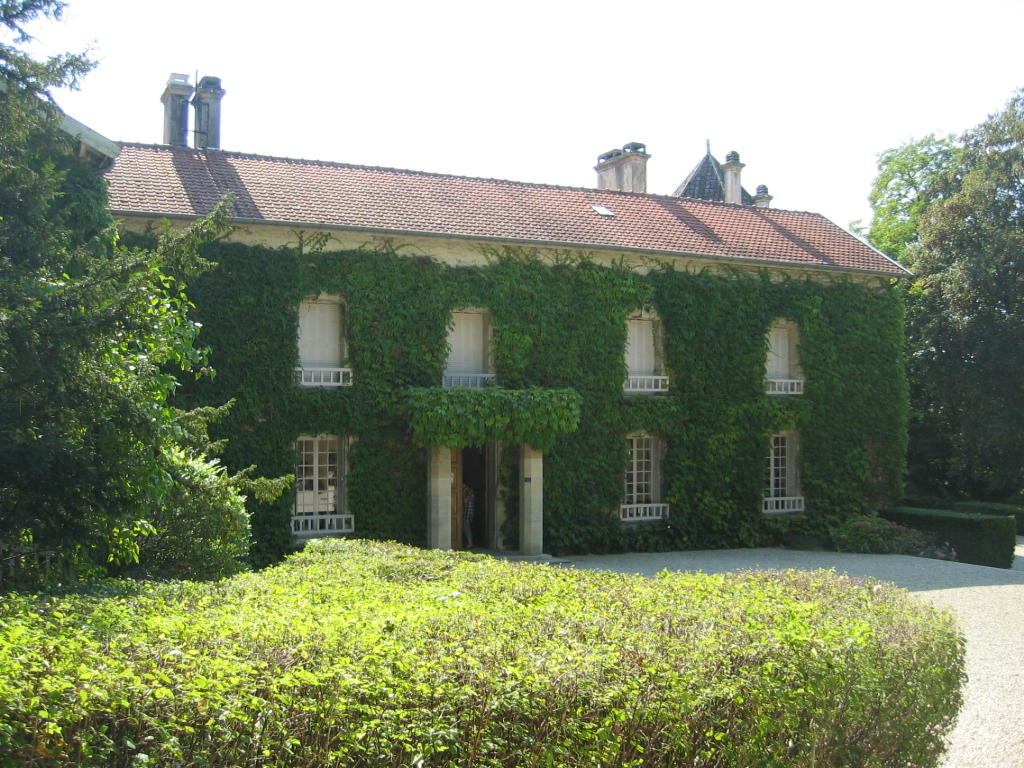
La Boisserie, the home of Charles de Gaulle at Colombey les Deux Églises

Colombey achieved fame as the home and burial site of the 20th-century general and statesman Charles de Gaulle, who acquired a substantial property on the southwestern edge of the village in 1934. De Gaulle withdrew repeatedly to Colombey when his political fortunes waned, first on the establishment of the Fourth Republic in 1946, and then between 1953 and 1958, before he became president again at the height of the Algerian Crisis. His final withdrawal to Colombey came after his resignation in 1969 and he died there the following year. "Colombey" became widely used as a political metaphor for a statesman's temporary withdrawal from political life until his country came calling for him again.

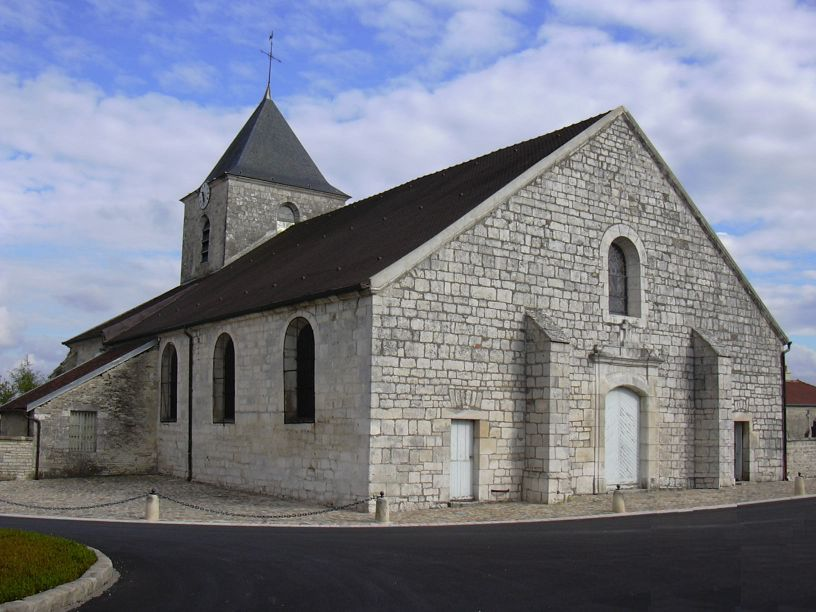
The church of Colombey les Deux Églises

De Gaulle is buried in the cemetery in Colombey, in a humble grave with the inscription "Charles de Gaulle 1890-1970". In addition, a 44.3 m (145 ft)) high Cross of Lorraine was built at the western exit of the village, commemorating his distinguished wartime role as commander of the Free French Forces. A memorial museum was inaugurated in October 2008 by Nicolas Sarkozy and Angela Merkel. This joint Franco-German act marked the fiftieth anniversary of talks in Colombey on 14 September 1958 between Charles de Gaulle and Konrad Adenauer, as part of the process of post-war reconciliation.

== Geography ==
The River Blaise flows through the commune.

== History ==
On September 14, 1958, Charles de Gaulle received Federal Chancellor Konrad Adenauer on a private visit to La Boisserie.

== See also ==
- Communes of the Haute-Marne department
