= Tzarfati (surname) =

Tzarfati or Zarfati (Hebrew: צרפתי) is a Hebrew ethnonymic surname derived from the word Tzarfat, which came to mean France; therefore, as a surname,Tzarfati means "a Jew of French birth or descent". It is associated with the Tzarfati family. Transliteration variants include Sarfati and a number of others listed in the "Sarfati" page, which also gives the origins of the surname. Notable people with the surname include:

- Asher Tzarfati (1944–2022), Israeli theater, film and television actor and theater director
- Dana Tzarfati (born 1970) Israeli set and costume designer
- Guy Tzarfati, Israeli footballer
- Jackie Tzarfati, Israeli footballer
- Joseph Zarfati, birth name of Andrea De Monte, Moroccan Jewish convert to Christianity and missionary to the Jews at Rome
- Ruth Zarfati, Israeli painter, sculptor and illustrator
- Tomer Tzarfati (born 2003), Israeli footballer
- Tzedi Tzarfati, Israeli television presenter, director, and actor

== See also ==
- Sarfati
