= Charles de Gaulle during World War II =

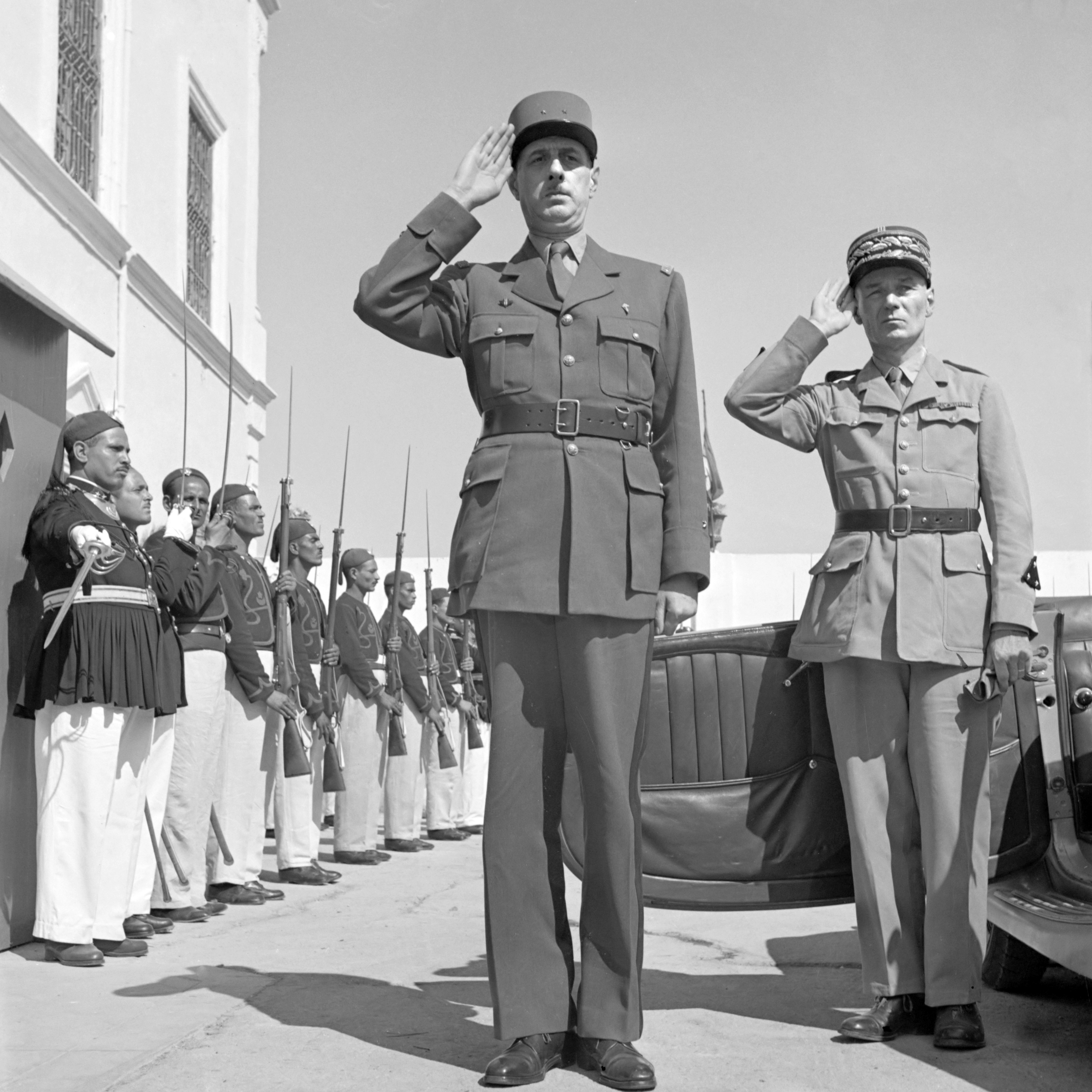
Charles de Gaulle and Charles Mast saluting to the French national anthem in Tunis, Tunisia (1943)

At the outbreak of World War II, Charles de Gaulle was put in charge of the French 5th Army's tanks (five scattered battalions, largely equipped with R35 light tanks) in Alsace, and on 12 September 1939, he attacked at Bitche, simultaneously with the Saar Offensive.

In late February 1940, Paul Reynaud told de Gaulle that he had been earmarked for command of an armoured division as soon as one became available. In late March, de Gaulle was told by Reynaud that he would be given command of the 4th Armoured Division by 15 May. The government appeared likely to be restructured, as Édouard Daladier and Maurice Gamelin were under attack in the aftermath of the Allied defeat in Norway, and had this happened de Gaulle, who on 3 May, was still lobbying Reynaud for a restructuring of the control of the war, might well have joined the government. By 7 May, he was assembling the staff of his new division.

De Gaulle founded and headed several organization during the course of the war to administer the operation of Free France, starting with the Empire Defense Council days after Vichy capitulated in June 1940, and ending with the Provisional Government, which provided the transition from the liberation of France through the first elections in 1945, to the establishment of the Fourth Republic in 1947.

== Battle of France ==
=== Division commander ===
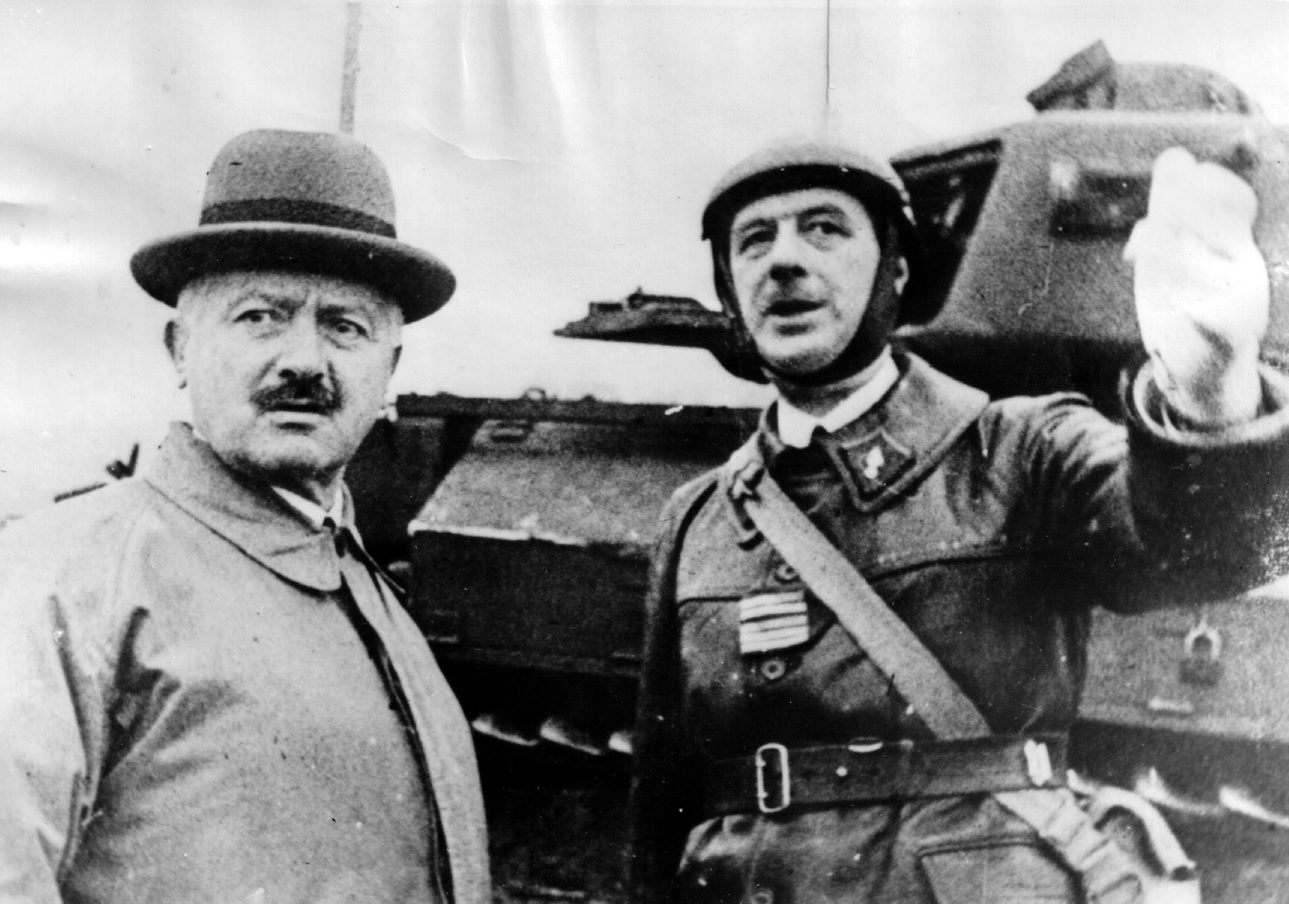
De Gaulle as commander, next to President Albert Lebrun in 1939. Behind the two men is a Char D2 medium tank.

Nazi Germany attacked France on 10 May 1940. De Gaulle led his new division on 12 May. The Nazis broke through at Sedan on 15 May. That day, with three tank battalions assembled, less than a third of his paper strength, he was summoned to headquarters and told to attack to gain time for General Robert Touchon's Sixth Army to redeploy from the Maginot Line to the Aisne. General Georges told him it was his chance to implement his ideas.

De Gaulle commandeered a retreating cavalry. The attack at Montcornet, a key road junction near Laon, began around 04:30 on 17 May; outnumbered and without air support, he lost 23 of his 90 vehicles to mines, anti-tank weapons, and Stukas. On 18 May he was reinforced by two fresh regiments of armoured cavalry, and attacked again on 19 May, where his forces were once again devastated by German artillery. He ignored orders from General Georges to withdraw, and demanded two more divisions from Touchon, who refused his request. Although de Gaulle's tanks forced German infantry to retreat to Caumont, the action brought only temporary relief and did little to slow the spearhead of the German advance. Nevertheless, it was one of the few successes the French enjoyed while suffering defeats elsewhere across the country.

He delayed his retreat until 20 May. On 21 May, at the request of propaganda officers, he gave a talk on French radio about his recent attack. In recognition for his efforts de Gaulle was promoted to the rank of temporary (acting, in Anglophone parlance) brigadier-general on 23 May 1940. Despite being compulsorily retired as a colonel on 22 June (see below) he would wear the uniform of a brigadier-general for the rest of his life. De Gaulle attacked the German bridgehead at Abbeville on 28–29 May, taking around 400 German prisoners in the last attempt to cut an escape route for the Allied forces.

The future General Paul Huard, who served under de Gaulle at this time, recorded how he would often stand on a piece of high ground, keeping other officers literally at six yards' distance, subjecting his subordinates to harsh criticism and making all decisions autocratically himself, behaviour consistent with his later conduct as a political leader. Jean Lacouture points out that for all his undoubted energy and physical courage there is no evidence in his brief period of command that he possessed the "hunter's eye" of the great battlefield commander, and that not a single one of his officers joined him in London, although some joined the Resistance in France.

De Gaulle's rank of brigadier-general became effective on 1 June 1940. That day he was in Paris. After a visit to his tailor to be fitted for his general's uniform, he visited Reynaud, who appears to have offered him a government job for the first time, and later afterwards the commander-in-chief Maxime Weygand, who congratulated him on saving France's honour and asked him for his advice. On 2 June he sent a memo to Weygand vainly urging that the French armoured divisions be consolidated from four weak divisions into three stronger ones and concentrated into an armoured corps under his command. He made the same suggestion to Reynaud.

=== Government minister ===
On 5 June, the day the Germans began the second phase of their offensive (Fall Rot), Prime Minister Paul Reynaud appointed de Gaulle a government minister, as Under-Secretary of State for National Defence and War, with particular responsibility for coordination with the British. Weygand objected to the appointment, thinking him "a mere child". Pétain (Deputy Prime Minister) was also displeased at his appointment and told Reynaud the story of the ghost-writing of Le Soldat. His appointment received a good deal of press attention, both in France and in the UK. He asked for an English-speaking aide and Geoffroy Chodron de Courcel was given the job.

On 8 June, de Gaulle visited Weygand, who believed it was "the end" and that after France was defeated Britain would also soon sue for peace. He hoped that after an armistice the Germans would allow him to retain enough of a French Army to "maintain order" in France. He gave a "despairing laugh" when de Gaulle suggested fighting on.

On 9 June, de Gaulle flew to London and met British Prime Minister Winston Churchill for the first time. It was thought that half a million men could be evacuated to French North Africa, provided the British and French navies and air forces coordinated their efforts. Either at this meeting or on 16 June, he urged Churchill in vain to throw more Royal Air Force (RAF) aircraft into the Battle of France, but conceded there and then that Churchill was right to refuse.

In his memoirs, de Gaulle mentioned his support for the proposal to continue the war from French North Africa, but at the time he was more in favour of the plan to form a "redoubt" in Brittany than he later admitted.

Italy entered the war on 10 June. That day de Gaulle was present at two meetings with Weygand (he only mentions one in his memoirs), one at the defence committee and a second where Weygand barged into Reynaud's office and demanded an armistice. When Weygand asked de Gaulle, who wanted to carry on fighting, if he had "anything to suggest", de Gaulle replied that it was the government's job to give orders, not to make suggestions. De Gaulle wanted Paris to be stubbornly defended by de Lattre, but instead it was declared an open city. At around 23:00 Reynaud and de Gaulle left Paris for Tours; the rest of the government left Paris on 11 June.

=== Briare and Tours ===
On 11 June, de Gaulle drove to Arcis-sur-Aube and offered General Charles Huntziger (Commander of the Central Army Group) Weygand's job as Commander-in-Chief. Huntziger accepted in principle (although according to Henri Massis he was merely amused at the prospect of forming a Breton redoubt – Huntziger would sign the armistice on behalf of Pétain a few weeks later) but de Gaulle was unable to persuade Reynaud to sack Weygand.

Later, on 11 June, de Gaulle attended the meeting of the Anglo-French Supreme War Council at the Chateau du Muguet at Briare. The British were represented by Churchill, Anthony Eden, General John Dill (Chief of the Imperial General Staff), General Hastings Ismay and Edward Spears, and the French by Reynaud, Pétain, Weygand, and Georges. Churchill demanded that the French take to guerrilla warfare, and reminded Pétain of how he had come to the aid of the British with forty French divisions in March 1918, receiving a dusty answer in each case. De Gaulle's fighting spirit made a strong impression on the British. At the meeting de Gaulle met Pétain for the first time in two years. Pétain noted his recent promotion to general, adding that he did not congratulate him, as ranks were of no use in defeat. When de Gaulle protested that Pétain himself had been promoted to brigadier-general and division commander at the Battle of the Marne in 1914, he replied that there was "no comparison" with the present situation. De Gaulle later conceded that Pétain was right about that much at least. De Gaulle missed the second day of the conference as he was in Rennes for a meeting (not mentioned in his memoirs) to discuss the plans for the Breton redoubt with General René Altmayer. He then returned to attend a cabinet meeting, at which it was clear that there was a growing movement for an armistice, and which decided that the government should move to Bordeaux rather than de Gaulle's preference for Quimper in Brittany.

On 13 June, de Gaulle attended another Anglo-French conference at Tours with Churchill, Lord Halifax, Lord Beaverbrook, Spears, Ismay, and Alexander Cadogan. This time few other major French figures were present apart from Reynaud and Baudoin. He was an hour late, and his account is not reliable. Reynaud demanded that France be released from the agreement which he had made with Prime Minister Neville Chamberlain in March 1940, so that France could seek an armistice. De Gaulle wrote that Churchill was sympathetic to France seeking an armistice, provided that an agreement was reached about what was to happen to the French fleet. This claim was later made by apologists for the Vichy Regime, e.g., General Georges, who claimed that Churchill had supported the armistice as a means of keeping the Germans out of French North Africa. However, is not supported by other eyewitnesses (Churchill himself, Roland de Margerie, Spears) who agree that Churchill said that he "understood" the French action but that he did not agree with it. He murmured at de Gaulle that he was "l'homme du destin (the man of destiny)", although it is unclear whether de Gaulle actually heard him. At the cabinet meeting that evening Pétain strongly supported Weygand's demand for an armistice, and said that he himself would remain in France to share the suffering of the French people and to begin the national rebirth. De Gaulle was dissuaded from resigning by the Interior Minister Georges Mandel, who argued that the war was only just beginning, and that de Gaulle needed to keep his reputation unsullied.

=== Franco-British Union ===
De Gaulle arrived at Bordeaux on 14 June, and was given a new mission to go to London to discuss the potential evacuation to North Africa. He had a brief meeting with Admiral Darlan about the potential role of the French Navy. That evening, by coincidence, he dined in the same restaurant as Pétain: he went over to shake his hand in silence, the last time they ever met. Next morning no aircraft could be found so he had to drive to Brittany, where he visited his wife and daughters, and his aged mother (whom he never saw again, as she died in July), before taking a boat to Plymouth (he asked the skipper if he would be willing to carry on the war under the British flag), where he arrived on 16 June. He ordered the boat Pasteur, with a cargo of munitions, to be diverted to a British port, which caused some members of the French Government to call for him to be put on trial.

On the afternoon of Sunday 16 June, de Gaulle was at 10 Downing Street for talks about Jean Monnet's mooted Anglo-French political union. He telephoned Reynaud – they were cut off during the conversation and had to resume later – with the news that the British had agreed. He took off from London on a British aircraft at 18:30 on 16 June (it is unclear whether, as was later claimed, he and Churchill agreed that he would be returning soon), landing at Bordeaux at around 22:00 to be told that he was no longer a minister, as Reynaud had resigned as prime minister after the Franco-British Union had been rejected by his cabinet. Pétain had become prime minister with a remit of seeking an armistice with Nazi Germany. De Gaulle was now in imminent danger of arrest.

=== Flight with Edward Spears ===
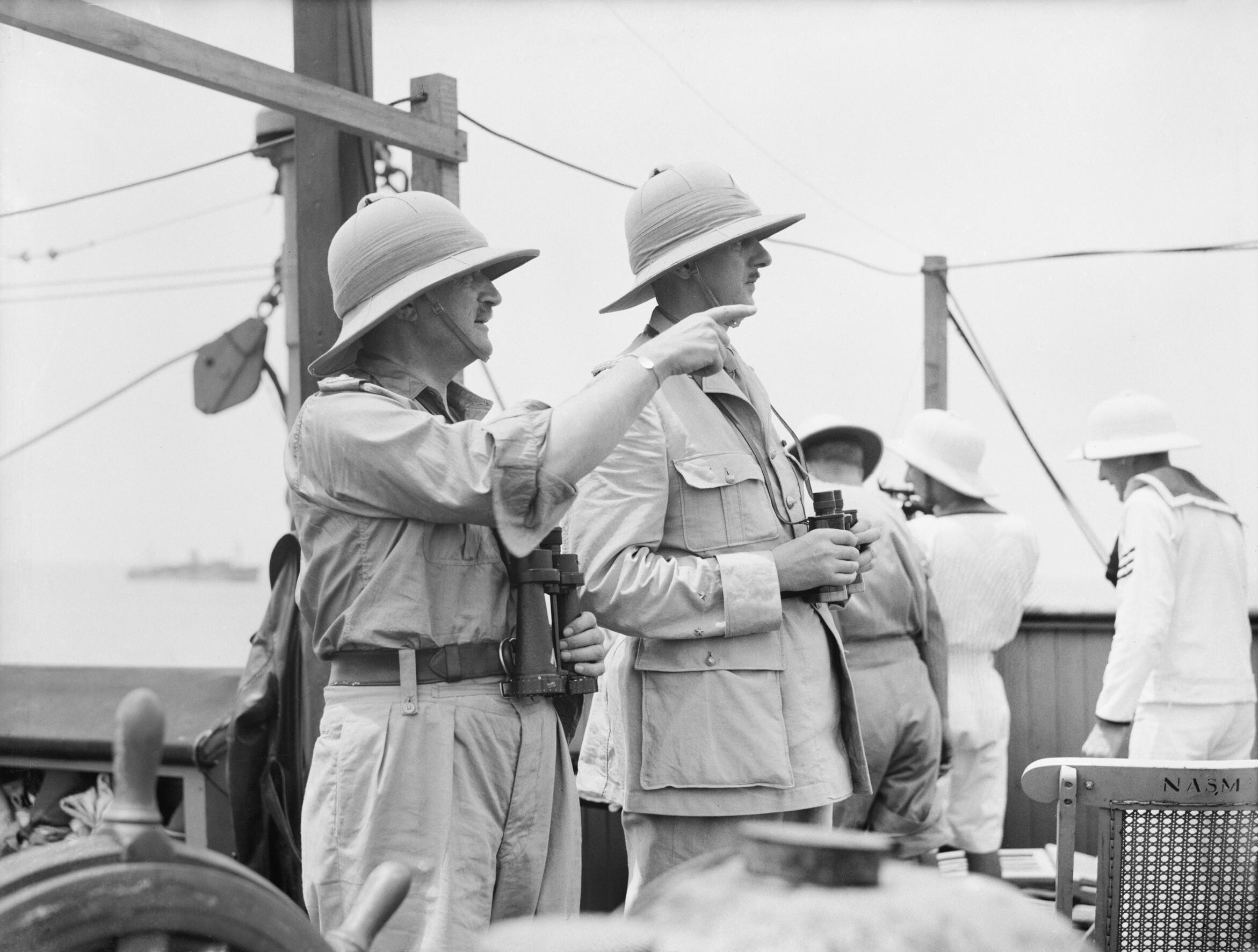
De Gaulle and Edward Spears a few months later, standing on the bridge of the SS Westernland (September 1940)

De Gaulle visited Reynaud, who still hoped to escape to French North Africa and declined to come to London. Reynaud still had control of secret government funds until the handover of power the next day. It has been suggested that he ordered de Gaulle to go to London, but no written evidence has ever been found to confirm this. Georges Mandel also refused to come.

At around 09:00 on the morning of 17 June, de Gaulle flew to London on a British aircraft with Edward Spears. The escape was hair-raising. Spears claimed that de Gaulle had been reluctant to come, and that he had pulled him into the aircraft at the last minute, although de Gaulle's biographer does not accept this. Jean Laurent brought 100,000 gold francs in secret funds provided to him by Reynaud. De Gaulle later told André Malraux of the mental anguish which his flight to London – a break with the French Army and with the recognised government, which would inevitably be seen as treason by many – had caused him.

== Leader of the Free French in exile ==
=== Appeal from London ===
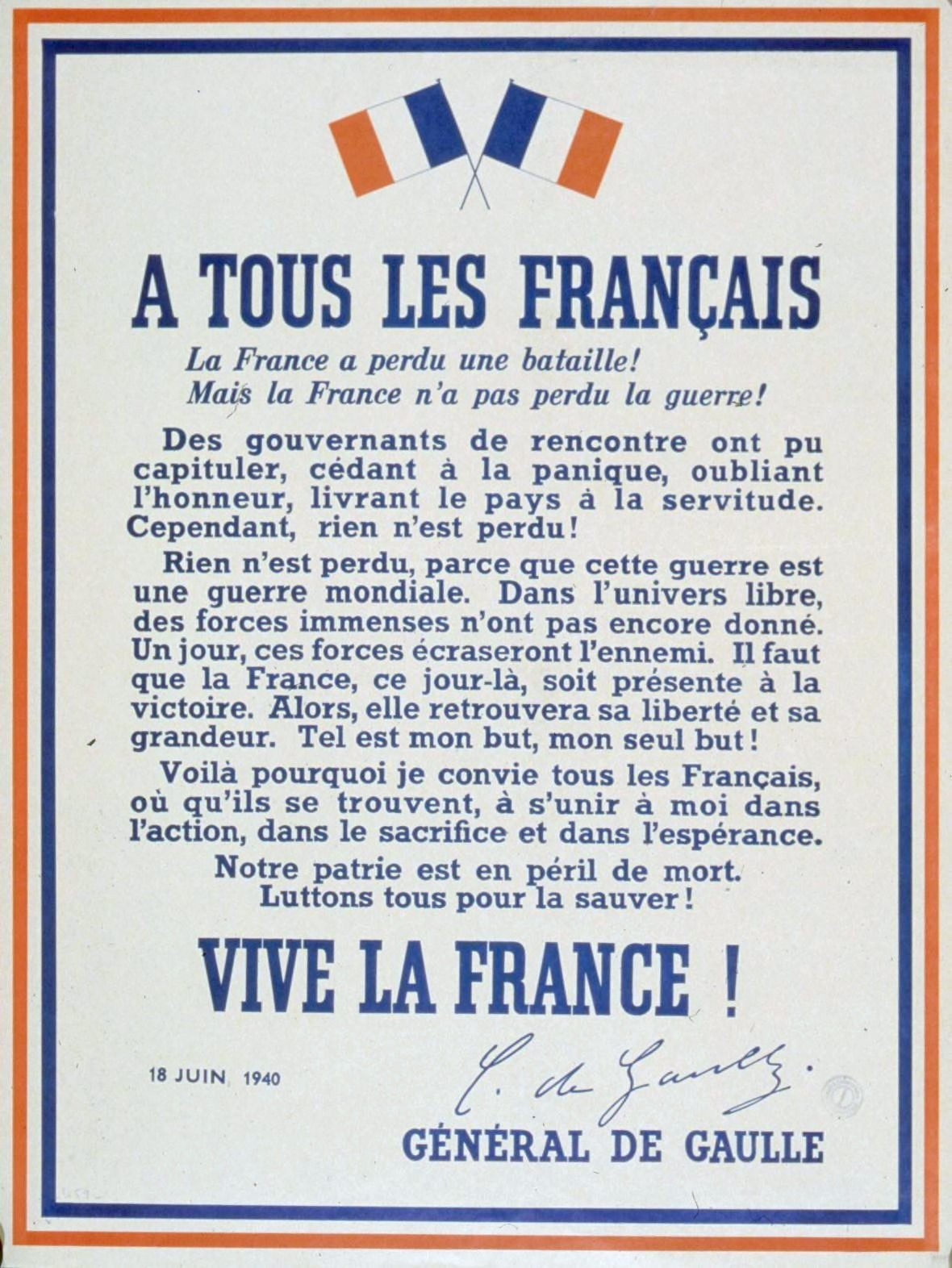
"To all Frenchmen": de Gaulle exhorting the French to resist the German occupation

De Gaulle landed at Heston Airport soon after 12:30 on 17 June 1940. He saw Churchill at around 15:00 and Churchill offered him broadcast time on BBC. They both knew about Pétain's broadcast earlier that day that stated that "the fighting must end" and that he had approached the Germans for terms. That evening de Gaulle dined with Jean Monnet and denounced Pétain's "treason". The next day the British Cabinet (Churchill was not present, as it was the day of his "Finest Hour" speech) were reluctant to agree to de Gaulle giving a radio address, as Britain was still in communication with the Pétain government about the fate of the French fleet. Duff Cooper (Minister of Information) had an advance copy of the text of the address, to which there were no objections. The cabinet eventually agreed after individual lobbying, as indicated by a handwritten amendment to the cabinet minutes.

De Gaulle's Appeal of 18 June exhorted the French people not to be demoralized and to continue to resist the occupation of France. He also – apparently on his own initiative – declared that he would broadcast again the next day. Few listened to the 18 June speech; the speech was published in some newspapers in metropolitan (mainland) France. It was largely aimed at French soldiers who were then in Britain after being evacuated from Norway and Dunkirk; most showed no interest in fighting for de Gaulle's Free French Forces and were repatriated back to France to become German prisoners of war.

In his next speech, intended for 19 June, de Gaulle denied the legitimacy of the government at Bordeaux. He called on the North African troops to live up to the tradition of Bertrand Clausel, Thomas Robert Bugeaud, and Hubert Lyautey by defying orders from Bordeaux. The British Foreign Office protested to Churchill, and it was not actually broadcast although appearing in de Gaulle's collection of his speeches. Britain still hoped that the new French government would cooperate, and did not want to publicly support a possible alternative whom Alexander Cadogan described as a "crank".

The 18 June speech invited French soldiers and civilians to join de Gaulle. Although the French embassy did not release his address, some found de Gaulle at his borrowed apartment. The general told one visitor "We are starting from zero" as he had no men, money, or premises. The visitor could help, de Gaulle said, by staying while he went to lunch so that someone would be there to answer the phone or door.

De Gaulle also tried, largely in vain, to attract the support of French forces in the French Empire. He telegraphed to General Charles Noguès (Resident-General in Morocco and Commander-in-Chief of French forces in North Africa), offering to serve under him or to cooperate in any way. Noguès, who was dismayed by the armistice but agreed to go along with it, refused to cooperate and forbade the press in French North Africa to publish de Gaulle's appeal. Noguès told the British liaison officer that de Gaulle's attitude was "unseemly". De Gaulle also sent a telegram to Weygand offering to serve under his orders, receiving a dismissive reply.

In the United States, the France Forever organization was founded.

After the armistice was signed on 21 June 1940, de Gaulle spoke at 20:00 on 22 June to denounce it. The Bordeaux government reacted immediately, annulling his temporary promotion to brigadier-general with effect from the same day, and forcibly retiring him from the French Army (with the rank of colonel) on 23 June "as a disciplinary measure" (par mesure de discipline). On 23 June the British Government denounced the armistice as a breach of the Anglo-French treaty signed in March, and stated that they no longer regarded the Bordeaux Government as a fully independent state. They also "took note" of the plan to establish a French National Committee (FNC) in exile, but did not mention de Gaulle by name. Jean Monnet, Chairman of the Anglo-French Coordinating Committee, believed de Gaulle could not yet claim that he alone represented fighting France, and that French opinion would not rally to a man operating from British soil. He said this in a letter to de Gaulle on 23 June, and noted he had made his concerns known to British Foreign Office officials Cadogan and Robert Vansittart, as well as Edward Spears. Monnet soon resigned as Chairman of the Anglo-French Coordinating Committee, and departed for the US to continue his work securing supplies from North America (now with the British Purchasing Commission.)

=== Leader of the Free French ===
The armistice took effect from 00:35 on 25 June. Alexander Cadogan of the Foreign Office sent Gladwyn Jebb, then a fairly junior official, to ask de Gaulle to tone down his next broadcast on 26 June; de Gaulle backed down under protest when Jebb told him that he would otherwise be banned from broadcasting. He claimed erroneously that the French fleet was to be handed over to the Germans. On 26 June de Gaulle wrote to Churchill demanding recognition of his French Committee. On 28 June, after Churchill's envoys had failed to establish contact with the French leaders in North Africa, the British Government recognised de Gaulle as leader of the Free French, despite the reservations of Halifax and Cadogan at the Foreign Office. Cadogan later wrote that de Gaulle was "that c*** of a fellow", but other Foreign Office figures Robert Vansittart and Oliver Harvey were quite sympathetic, as was The Times which gave de Gaulle plenty of coverage.

De Gaulle had little success in attracting the support of major figures. Ambassador Charles Corbin, who had strongly supported the mooted Anglo-French Union on 16 June, resigned from the French Foreign Office but retired to South America. Alexis Leger, Secretary-General at the Quai d'Orsay (who hated Reynaud for sacking him) came to London but went on to the US. Roland de Margerie stayed in France despite his opposition to the armistice. De Gaulle received support from Captain Tissier and André Dewavrin (both of whom had been fighting in Norway prior to joining the Free French), Gaston Palewski, Maurice Schumann, and the jurist René Cassin.

Pétain's government was recognised by the US, the USSR, and the Papacy, and controlled the French fleet and the forces in almost all her colonies. At this time de Gaulle's followers consisted of a secretary of limited competence, three colonels, a dozen captains, a famous law professor (Cassin), and three battalions of legionnaires who had agreed to stay in Britain and fight for him. For a time the New Hebrides were the only French colony to back de Gaulle. On 30 June 1940 Admiral Muselier joined the Free French.

De Gaulle initially reacted angrily to news of the Royal Navy's attack on the French fleet (3 July); Pétain and others wrongly blamed him for provoking it by his 26 June speech (in fact it had been planned at least as early as 16 June). He considered withdrawing to Canada to live as a private citizen and waited five days before broadcasting. Spears called on de Gaulle on 5 July and found him "astonishingly objective" and acknowledging that it was the right thing from the British point of view. Spears reported to Churchill that de Gaulle had shown "a splendid dignity". In his broadcast of 8 July he spoke of the "pain and anger" caused by the attack and that it was a "hateful tragedy not a glorious battle", but that one day the enemy would have used the ships against England or the French Empire, and that the defeat of England would mean "bondage forever" for France. "Our two ancient nations...remain bound to one another. They will either go down both together or both together they will win".

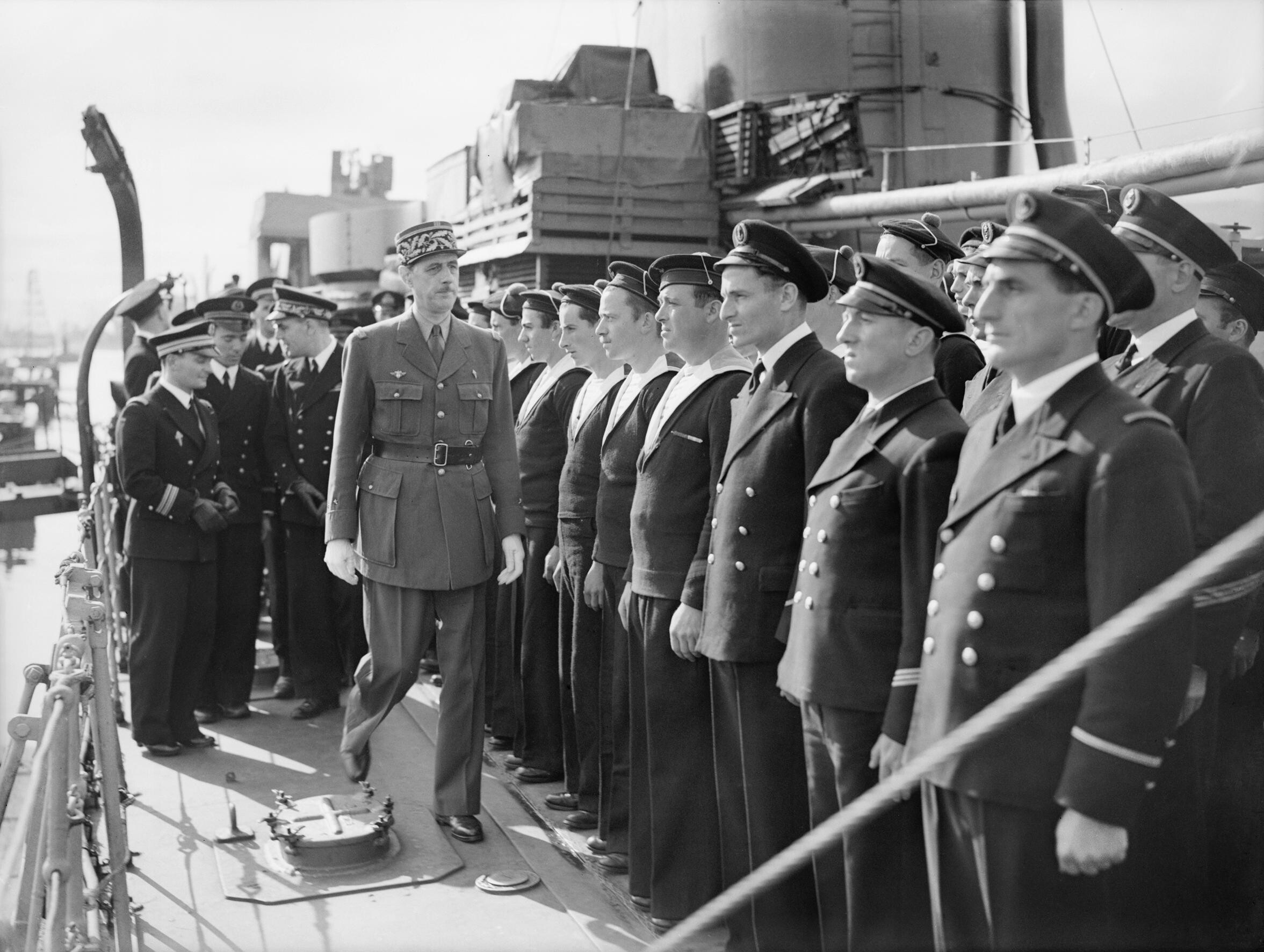
General De Gaulle inspecting sailors on Léopard in June 1942

On Bastille Day (14 July) 1940 de Gaulle led a group of between 200 and 300 sailors to lay a wreath at the statue of Ferdinand Foch at Grosvenor Gardens. A mass of anonymous flowers were left on his mother's grave on 16 July 1940, suggesting he was not without admirers in France.

From 22 July 1940 de Gaulle used 4 Carlton Gardens in central London as his London headquarters. His family had left Brittany (the other ship which left at the same time was sunk) and lived for a time at Petts Wood. As his daughter Anne was terrified by the Blitz they moved to Ellesmere in Shropshire, a four-hour journey from London and where de Gaulle was only able to visit them once a month. His wife and daughter also lived for a time in the country at Rodinghead House, Little Gaddesden, in Hertfordshire, 45 kilometres (28 miles) from central London. De Gaulle lived at the Connaught Hotel in London, then from 1942 to 1944 he lived in Hampstead, North London.

The small audience of the 18 June appeal grew for later speeches, and the press by early August described Free French military as fighting under de Gaulle's command, although few in France knew anything about him. (When he returned to France after liberation, people sometimes greeted another, more senior officer with him as de Gaulle, believing that he must be a five-star general.) Many thought that "Degaule", "Dugaul", or "Gaul" was a nom de guerre, disbelieving that the mysterious general describing himself as the nation's liberator was called the ancient name of France. Agnès Humbert, who had heard the 18 June speech, wrote in her diary of distributing pamphlets supporting de Gaulle's cause, despite his being

a leader of whom we know absolutely nothing, of whom none of us has ever seen a photograph. In the whole course of human history, has there ever been anything quite like it? Thousands upon thousands of people, fired by blind faith, following an unknown figure. Perhaps this strange anonymity is even an asset: the mystery of the unknown!

The Vichy regime had already sentenced de Gaulle to four years' imprisonment; on 2 August 1940 he was condemned to death by court martial in absentia, although Pétain commented that he would ensure that the sentence was never carried out. De Gaulle said of the sentence, "I consider the act of the Vichy men as void; I shall have an explanation with them after the victory". He and Churchill reached agreement on 7 August 1940, that Britain would fund the Free French, with the bill to be settled after the war (the financial agreement was finalised in March 1941). A separate letter guaranteed the territorial integrity of the French Empire.

General Georges Catroux, Governor of French Indo-China (which was increasingly coming under Japan's thumb), disapproved of the armistice and congratulated de Gaulle, whom he had known for many years. He was sacked by Vichy and arrived in London on 31 August; de Gaulle had gone to Dakar, but they met in Chad four weeks later. He was the most senior military figure to defect to the Free French.

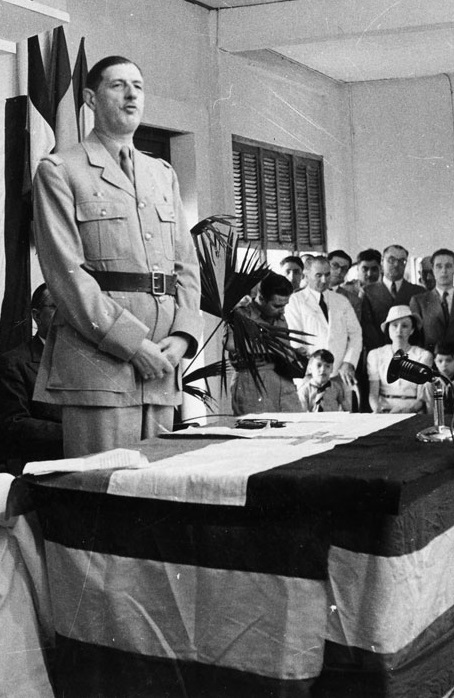
De Gaulle at the inauguration of the Brazzaville Conference, French Equatorial Africa, 1944

De Gaulle's support grew out of a base in the colonial French Equatorial Africa. In the fall of 1940, the colonial empire largely supported the Vichy regime. Félix Éboué, governor of Chad, switched his support to General de Gaulle in September. Encouraged, de Gaulle traveled to Brazzaville in October, where he announced the formation of an Empire Defense Council in his "Brazzaville Manifesto", and invited all colonies still supporting Vichy to join him and the Free French forces in the fight against Germany, which most of them did by 1943.

In October 1940, after talks between the Foreign Office and Louis Rougier, de Gaulle was asked to tone down his attacks on Pétain. On average he spoke on BBC radio three times a month.

De Gaulle established the Order of Liberation in Brazzaville in November 1940.

=== De Gaulle and Pétain: rival visions of France ===
Prime Minister Pétain moved the government to Vichy (2 July) and had the National Assembly (10 July) vote to dissolve itself and give him dictatorial powers, making the beginning of his Révolution nationale (National Revolution) intended to "reorient" French society. This was the dawn of the Vichy regime.

De Gaulle's subsequent speeches reached many parts of the territories under the Vichy regime, helping to rally the French resistance movement and earning him much popularity amongst the French people and soldiers. The British historian Christopher Flood noted that there were major differences between the speeches of de Gaulle and Pétain, which reflected their views on themselves and of France. Pétain always used the personal pronoun je, portrayed himself as both a Christ-like figure sacrificing himself for France while also assuming a God-like tone of a semi-omniscient narrator who knew truths about the world that the rest of the French did not. De Gaulle began by making frequent use of "I" and "me" in his war-time speeches, but over time, their use declined. Unlike Pétain, de Gaulle never invoked quasi-religious imagery to enhance his prestige. De Gaulle always mentioned Pétain by name whereas Pétain never mentioned de Gaulle directly, referring to him as the "faux ami" ("false friend").

Pétain exonerated the French military of responsibility for the defeat of 1940 which he blamed on the moral decline of French society (thus making his Révolution nationale necessary) while de Gaulle blamed the military chiefs while exonerating French society for the defeat (thus suggesting that French society was nowhere near as rotten as Pétain claimed, making the Révolution nationale unnecessary). Pétain claimed that France had "stupidly" declared war on Germany in 1939 at British prompting while de Gaulle spoke of the entire era since 1914 as "la guerre de trente ans" ("the thirty years' war"), arguing the two world wars were really one with a long truce in between. The only historical figure Pétain invoked was Joan of Arc as a model of self-sacrificing French patriotism in the "eternal struggle" against England whereas de Gaulle invoked virtually every major French historical figure from the ancient Gauls to World War I. De Gaulle's willingness to invoke historical figures from before and after 1789 was meant to suggest that his France was an inclusive France where there was room for both left and right, in contrast to Pétain's demand for national unity under his leadership. Most significantly, Pétain's speeches always stressed the need for France to withdraw from a hostile and threatening world to find unity. By contrast, de Gaulle's speeches, while praising the greatness of France, lacked Pétain's implicit xenophobia; the fight for a free, democratic and inclusive France was always portrayed as part of a wider worldwide struggle for world freedom, where France would be an anchor for a new democratic order.

De Gaulle spoke more of "the Republic" than of "democracy"; before his death René Cassin claimed that he had "succeeded in turning de Gaulle towards democracy". However, claims that de Gaulle was surrounded by Cagoulards, Royalists and other right-wing extremists are untrue. Some of André Dewavrin's closest colleagues were Cagoulards, although Dewavrin always denied that he himself was. Many leading figures of the Free French and the Resistance, e.g., Jean Moulin and Pierre Brossolette, were on the political left. By the end of 1940 de Gaulle was beginning to be recognised as the leader of the Resistance, a position cemented after Jean Moulin's visit to London in autumn 1941. In the summer of 1941 the BBC set aside five minutes per day (later increased to ten) for the Free French, with Maurice Schumann as the main spokesman, and eventually there was a programme "Les Francais parlent aux Francais". A newspaper France was also soon set up.

De Gaulle organised the Free French Forces and the Allies gave increasing support and recognition to de Gaulle's efforts. In London in September 1941 de Gaulle formed the French National Committee, with himself as president. It was an all-encompassing coalition of resistance forces, ranging from conservative Catholics like himself to communists. By early 1942, the "Fighting French" movement, as it was now called, gained rapidly in power and influence; it overcame Vichy in Syria and Lebanon, adding to its base. Dealing with the French communists was a delicate issue, for they were under Moscow's control and the USSR was friendly with Germany in 1940–41 as a result of the Molotov–Ribbentrop Pact. They came into the Free French movement only when Germany invaded Russia in June 1941. De Gaulle's policy then became one of friendship directly with Moscow, but Stalin showed little interest. In 1942, de Gaulle created the Normandie-Niemen squadron, a Free French Air Force regiment, in order to fight on the Eastern Front. It is the only Western allied formation to have fought until the end of the war in the East.

=== De Gaulle's relations with "les Anglo-Saxons" ===
In his dealings with the British and Americans (both referred to as the "Anglo-Saxons", in de Gaulle's parlance), he always insisted on retaining full freedom of action on behalf of France and was constantly on the verge of losing the Allies' support. Some writers have sought to deny that there was deep and mutual antipathy between de Gaulle and British and American political leaders.

De Gaulle personally had ambivalent feelings about Britain, possibly in part because of childhood memories of the Fashoda Incident. As an adult he spoke German much better than he spoke English. He had a multilingual translator and driver, Olivia Jordan, from 1940 to 1943. He had thought little of the British Army's contribution to the First World War, and even less of that of 1939–40, and in the 1930s he had been a reader of the journal Action Française which blamed Britain for German foreign policy gains at France's expense. De Gaulle explained his position:

Never did the Anglo-Saxons really treat us as real allies. They never consulted us, government to government, on any of their provisions. For political purpose or by convenience, they sought to use the French forces for their own goals, as if these forces belonged to them, alleging that they had provided weapons to them [...] I considered that I had to play the French game, since the others were playing theirs ... I deliberately adopted a stiffened and hardened attitude ....

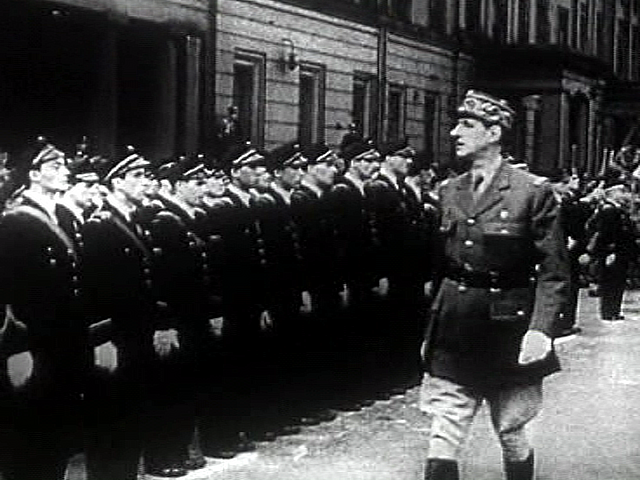
General de Gaulle reviews Free French Air Forces' airmen during Bastille Day parade at Wellington Barracks, 14 July 1942.

In addition, de Gaulle harboured a suspicion of the British in particular, believing that they were seeking to seize France's colonial possessions in the Levant. Winston Churchill was often frustrated at what he perceived as de Gaulle's patriotic arrogance, but also wrote of his "immense admiration" for him during the early days of his British exile. Although their relationship later became strained, Churchill tried to explain the reasons for de Gaulle's behaviour in the second volume of his history of World War II:

He felt it was essential to his position before the French people that he should maintain a proud and haughty demeanour towards "perfidious Albion", although in exile, dependent upon our protection and dwelling in our midst. He had to be rude to the British to prove to French eyes that he was not a British puppet. He certainly carried out this policy with perseverance.

De Gaulle described his adversarial relationship with Churchill in these words: "When I am right, I get angry. Churchill gets angry when he is wrong. We are angry at each other much of the time." On one occasion in 1941 Churchill spoke to him on the telephone. De Gaulle said that the French people thought he was a reincarnation of Joan of Arc, to which Churchill replied that the English had had to burn the last one. Clementine Churchill, who admired de Gaulle, once cautioned him, "General, you must not hate your friends more than you hate your enemies." De Gaulle himself stated famously, "No Nation has friends, only interests."

After his initial support, Churchill, emboldened by American antipathy to the French general, urged his War Cabinet to remove de Gaulle as leader of the Free France. But the War Cabinet warned Churchill that a precipitate break with de Gaulle would have a disastrous effect on the whole resistance movement. By autumn 1943, Churchill had to acknowledge that de Gaulle had won the struggle for leadership of Free France.

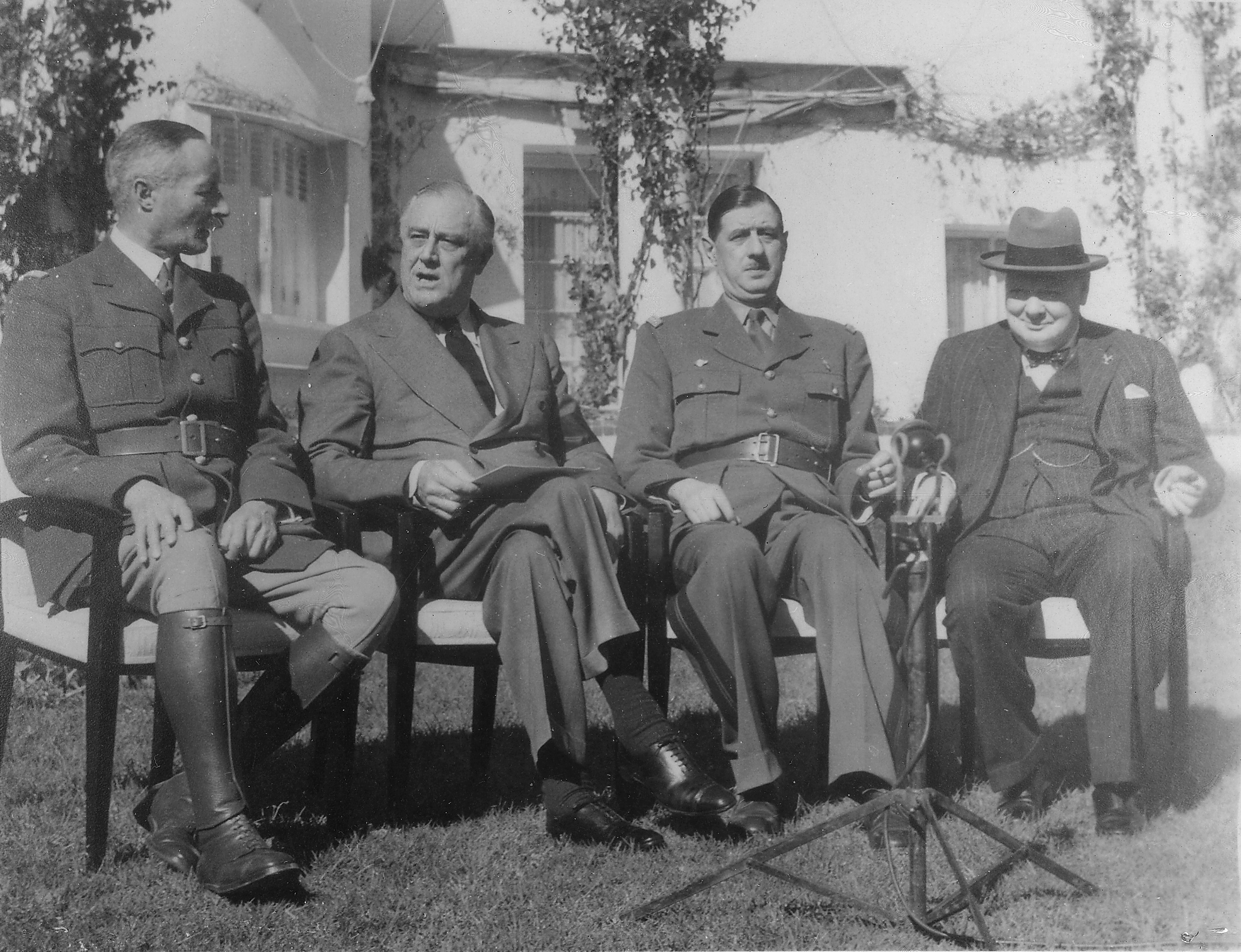
At the Casablanca Conference (14 January 1943), rival French leaders Henri Giraud (leftmost) and Charles de Gaulle (middle right) sit down after shaking hands in the presence of Franklin D. Roosevelt (middle left) and Winston Churchill (rightmost) — a public display of unity, but the handshake was only for show.

De Gaulle's relations with Washington were even more strained. President Roosevelt for a long time refused to recognize de Gaulle as the representative of France, insisting on negotiations with the Vichy government. Roosevelt in particular hoped that it would be possible to wean Pétain away from Germany. Roosevelt maintained recognition of the Vichy regime until late 1942, and saw de Gaulle as an impudent representative of a minority interest.

After 1942, Roosevelt championed General Henri Giraud, more compliant with US interests than de Gaulle, as the leader of the Free France. At the Casablanca Conference (1943), Roosevelt forced de Gaulle to cooperate with Giraud, but de Gaulle was considered as the undisputed leader of the Resistance by the French people and Giraud was progressively deprived of his political and military roles. The British and Soviet governments urged Roosevelt to recognise de Gaulle's provisional government, but Roosevelt delayed doing so as long as possible and even recognised the Italian provisional government before the French one. British and Soviet allies were outraged that the US president unilaterally recognised the new government of a former enemy before de Gaulle's one and both recognised the French government in retaliation, forcing Roosevelt to recognise de Gaulle in late 1944, but Roosevelt managed to exclude de Gaulle from the Yalta Conference. Roosevelt eventually abandoned his plans to rule France as an occupied territory and to transfer French Indochina to the United Nations.

=== Saint Pierre and Miquelon ===
In 1941, de Gaulle sent Admiral Émile Muselier to investigate the possibility of invading the islands Saint Pierre and Miquelon. Despite continued objections from the United States, de Gaulle ordered the capture of Saint Pierre and Miquelon. On 23 December 1941, a French flotilla consisting of the submarine Surcouf and three corvettes, Mimosa, Aconit and Alysse, carrying 230 men sailed from Halifax under the pretext of a training mission. Acting against the orders of Royal Canadian Navy Rear Admiral Leonard W. Murray, at 3 am on 24 December 1941, the flotilla arrived off the port of Saint-Pierre and disembarked 230 armed sailors. After meeting no resistance, the Free French forces captured the islands in only 20 minutes.

News of the capture reached the United States with Secretary of State Cordell Hull calling the capture a violation of prior agreements between the US and Allied powers and of US territorial doctrine, asserting that it was a "provocation to war in American waters between Vichy and de Gaulle," and comparing the Free French takeover to Axis aggression. The US considered dispatching naval forces to remove the Free French forces, but ultimately chose to propose a compromise that would see the islands demilitarized under US, British and Canadian supervision, with Free French ships redeploying to the Atlantic theatre.

=== Plane sabotage ===
On 21 April 1943, de Gaulle was scheduled to fly in a Wellington bomber to Scotland to inspect the Free French Navy. On take-off, the bomber's tail dropped, and the plane nearly crashed into the airfield's embankment. Only the skill of the pilot, who became aware of sabotage on takeoff, saved them. On inspection, it was found that aeroplane's separator rod had been sabotaged, using acid. Britain's MI6 investigated the incident, but no one was ever apprehended. Publicly, blame for the incident was cast on German intelligence; however, behind closed doors de Gaulle blamed the Western Allies, and later told colleagues that he no longer had confidence in them.

=== Algiers ===
Working with the French Resistance and other supporters in France's colonial African possessions after Operation Torch in November 1942, de Gaulle moved his headquarters to Algiers in May 1943, leaving Britain to be on French territory. He became first joint head (with the less resolutely independent General Henri Giraud, the candidate preferred by the US who wrongly suspected de Gaulle of being a British puppet) and then—after squeezing out Giraud by force of personality—sole chairman of the French Committee of National Liberation.

De Gaulle was held in high regard by Allied commander General Dwight Eisenhower. In Algiers in 1943, Eisenhower gave de Gaulle the assurance in person that a French force would liberate Paris and arranged that the army division of French General Philippe Leclerc de Hauteclocque would be transferred from North Africa to the UK to carry out that liberation. Eisenhower was impressed by the combativeness of units of the Free French Forces and "grateful for the part they had played in mopping up the remnants of German resistance"; he also detected how strongly devoted many were to de Gaulle and how ready they were to accept him as the national leader.

=== Preparations for D-Day ===
As preparations for the liberation of Europe gathered pace, the US in particular found de Gaulle's tendency to view everything from the French perspective to be extremely tiresome. Roosevelt, who refused to recognize any provisional authority in France until elections had been held, referred to de Gaulle as "an apprentice dictator", a view backed by a number of leading Frenchmen in Washington, including Jean Monnet, who later became an instrumental figure in the setting up of the European Coal and Steel Community that led to the modern European Union. Roosevelt directed Churchill not to provide de Gaulle with strategic details of the imminent invasion because he did not trust him to keep the information to himself. French codes were considered weak, posing a risk since the Free French refused to use British or American codes. De Gaulle refused to share coded information with the British, who were then obliged secretly to break the codes to read French messages.

Nevertheless, a few days before D-Day, Churchill, whose relationship with the General had deteriorated since he arrived in Britain, decided he needed to keep him informed of developments, and on 2 June he sent two passenger aircraft and his representative, Duff Cooper, to Algiers to bring de Gaulle back to Britain. De Gaulle refused because of Roosevelt's intention to install a provisional Allied military government in the former occupied territories pending elections, but he eventually relented and flew to Britain the next day.

Winston Churchill and General de Gaulle at Marrakesh, January 1944

Upon his arrival at RAF Northolt on 4 June 1944 he received an official welcome, and a letter reading "My dear general! Welcome to these shores, very great military events are about to take place!" Later, on his personal train, Churchill informed him that he wanted him to make a radio address, but when informed that the Americans continued to refuse to recognise his right to power in France, and after Churchill suggested he request a meeting with Roosevelt to improve his relationship with the president, de Gaulle became angry, demanding to know why he should "lodge my candidacy for power in France with Roosevelt; the French government exists".

De Gaulle became worried that the German withdrawal from France might lead to a breakdown of law and order in the country and even a possible communist takeover. During the general conversation which followed with those present, de Gaulle was involved in an angry exchange with the Labour minister, Ernest Bevin, and, raising his concerns about the validity of the new currency to be circulated by the Allies after the liberation, de Gaulle commented scornfully, "go and wage war with your false money". De Gaulle was very concerned that an American takeover of the French administration would just provoke a communist uprising.

Churchill then lost his temper, saying that Britain would always be an ally to the United States, and that under the circumstances, if they had to choose between France and the US, Britain would always choose the latter. De Gaulle replied that he realised this would always be the case. The next day, de Gaulle refused to address the French nation as the script again made no mention of his being the legitimate interim ruler of France. It instructed the French people to obey Allied military authorities until elections could be held, and so the row continued, with de Gaulle calling Churchill a "gangster". Churchill accused de Gaulle of treason in the height of battle, and demanded that he be flown back to Algiers "in chains if necessary".

De Gaulle and Churchill had a complex relationship during the wartime period. De Gaulle did show respect and admiration for Churchill, and even some light humorous interactions between the two have been noted by observers such as Duff Cooper, the British Ambassador to the French Committee of Liberation. Churchill explained his support for de Gaulle during the darkest hours, calling him "L'homme du destin".

In Casablanca in 1943, Churchill supported de Gaulle as the embodiment of a French Army that was otherwise defeated, stating that "De Gaulle is the spirit of that Army. Perhaps the last survivor of a warrior race." Churchill supported de Gaulle as he had been one of the first major French leaders to reject Nazi German rule outright, stating in August 1944 that "I have never forgotten, and can never forget, that he [de Gaulle] stood forth as the first eminent Frenchman to face the common foe in what seemed to be the hour of ruin of his country and possibly, of ours."

In the years to come, the sometimes hostile, sometimes friendly dependent wartime relationship of de Gaulle and his future political peers reenacted the historical national and colonial rivalry and lasting enmity between the French and the British, and foreshadowed the deep distrust of France for post-war Anglo-American partnerships.

=== Return to France ===
De Gaulle ignored les Anglo-Saxons, and proclaimed the authority of Free France over the metropolitan territory the next day. Under the leadership of General de Lattre de Tassigny, France fielded an entire army – a joint force of Free French together with French colonial troops from North Africa – on the Western Front. Initially landing as part of Operation Dragoon, in the south of France, the French First Army helped to liberate almost one third of the country and participated in the invasion and occupation of Germany. As the invasion slowly progressed and the Germans were pushed back, de Gaulle made preparations to return to France.

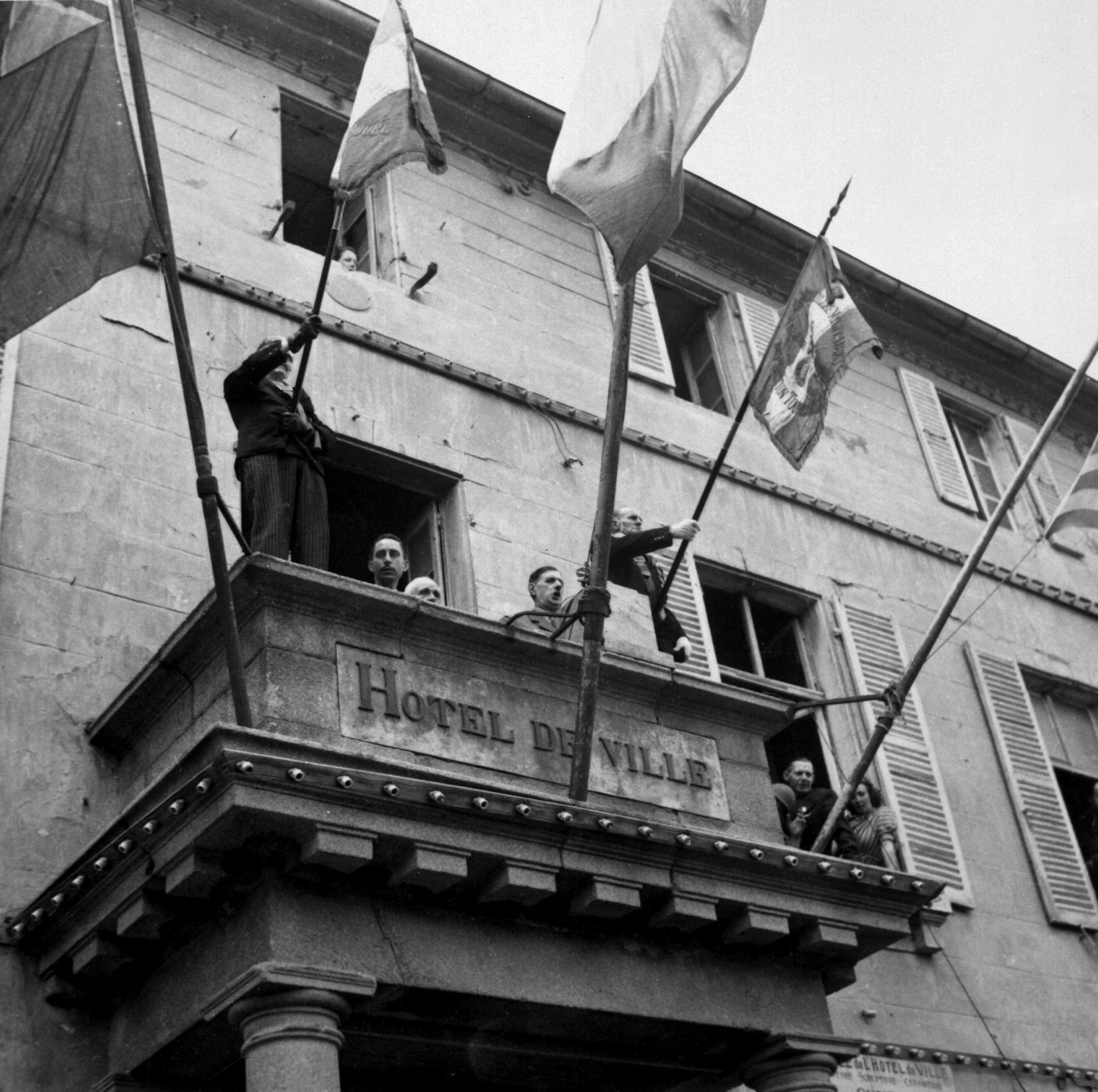
General de Gaulle delivering a speech in liberated Cherbourg from the hôtel de ville (town hall)

On 14 June 1944, he left Britain for France for what was supposed to be a one-day trip. Despite an agreement that he would take only two staff, he was accompanied by a large entourage with extensive luggage, and although many rural Normans remained mistrustful of him, he was warmly greeted by the inhabitants of the towns he visited, such as the badly damaged Isigny. Finally he arrived at the city of Bayeux, which he now proclaimed as the capital of Free France. Appointing his Aide-de-Camp Francois Coulet as head of the civil administration, de Gaulle returned to the UK that same night on a French destroyer, and although the official position of the supreme military command remained unchanged, local Allied officers found it more practical to deal with the fledgling administration in Bayeux in everyday matters. De Gaulle flew to Algiers on 16 June and then went on to Rome to meet the Pope and the new Italian government. At the beginning of July he at last visited Roosevelt in Washington, where he received the 17-gun salute of a senior military leader rather than the 21 guns of a visiting head of state. The visit was 'devoid of trust on both sides' according to the French representative, however, Roosevelt did make some concessions towards recognising the legitimacy of the Bayeux administration.

Meanwhile, with the Germans retreating in the face of the Allied onslaught, harried all the way by the resistance, there were widespread instances of revenge attacks on those accused of collaboration. A number of prominent officials and members of the feared Milice were murdered, often by exceptionally brutal means, provoking the Germans into appalling reprisals, such as in the destruction of the village of Oradour-sur-Glane and the killing of its 642 inhabitants.

Liberation of the French capital was not high on the Allies' list of priorities as it had comparatively little strategic value, but both de Gaulle and the commander of the French 2nd Armored Division, General Philippe Leclerc were still extremely concerned about a communist takeover. De Gaulle successfully lobbied for Paris to be made a priority for liberation on humanitarian grounds and obtained from Allied Supreme Commander General Dwight D. Eisenhower an agreement that French troops would be allowed to enter the capital first. A few days later, General Leclerc's division entered the outskirts of the city, and after six days of fighting in which the resistance played a major part, the German garrison of 5000 men surrendered on 25 August, although some sporadic outbreaks of fighting continued for several days. General Dietrich von Choltitz, the commander of the garrison, was instructed by Adolf Hitler to raze the city to the ground, however, he simply ignored the order and surrendered his forces.

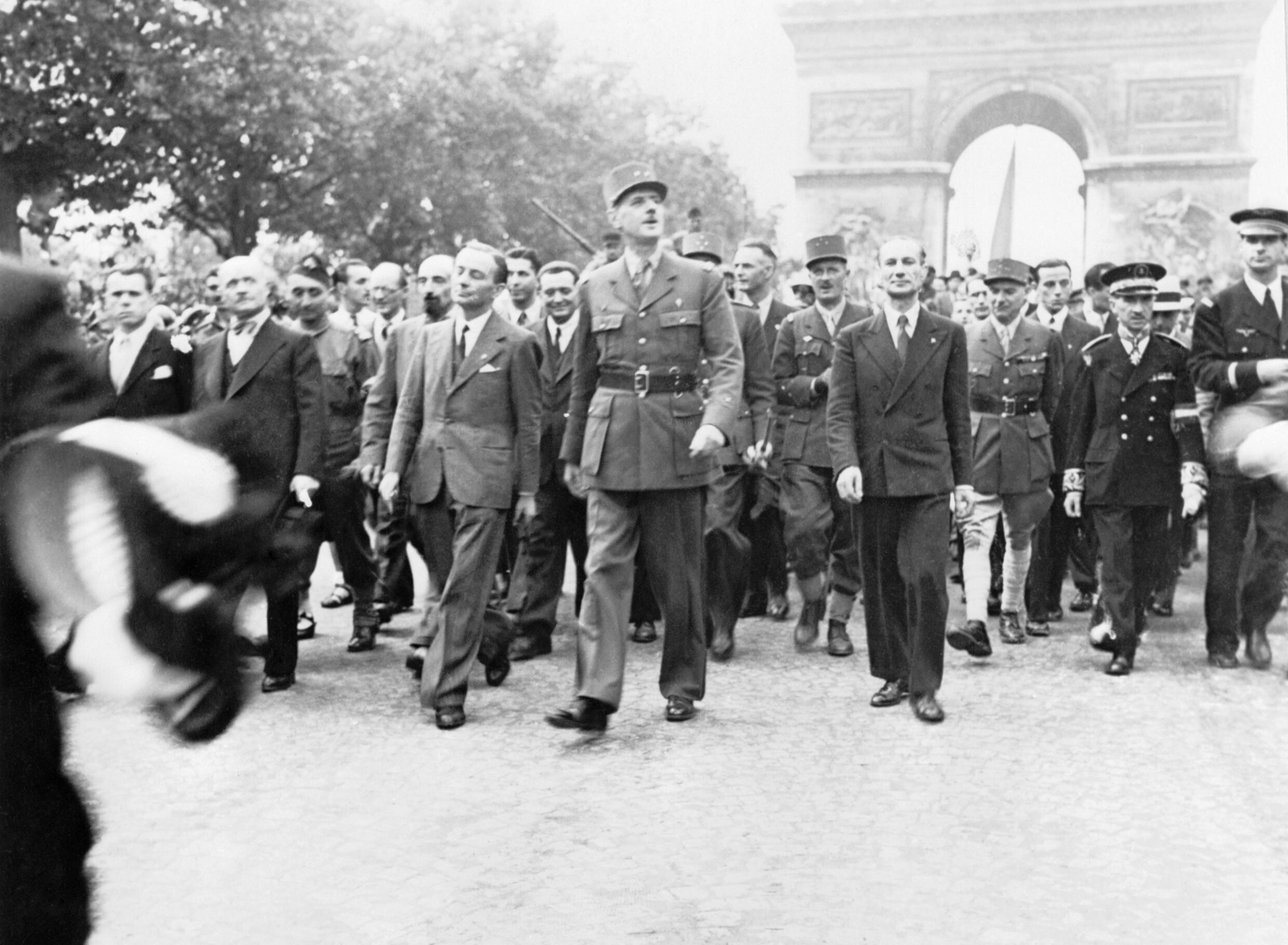
General de Gaulle and his entourage stroll down the Champs-Élysées following the liberation of Paris in August 1944.

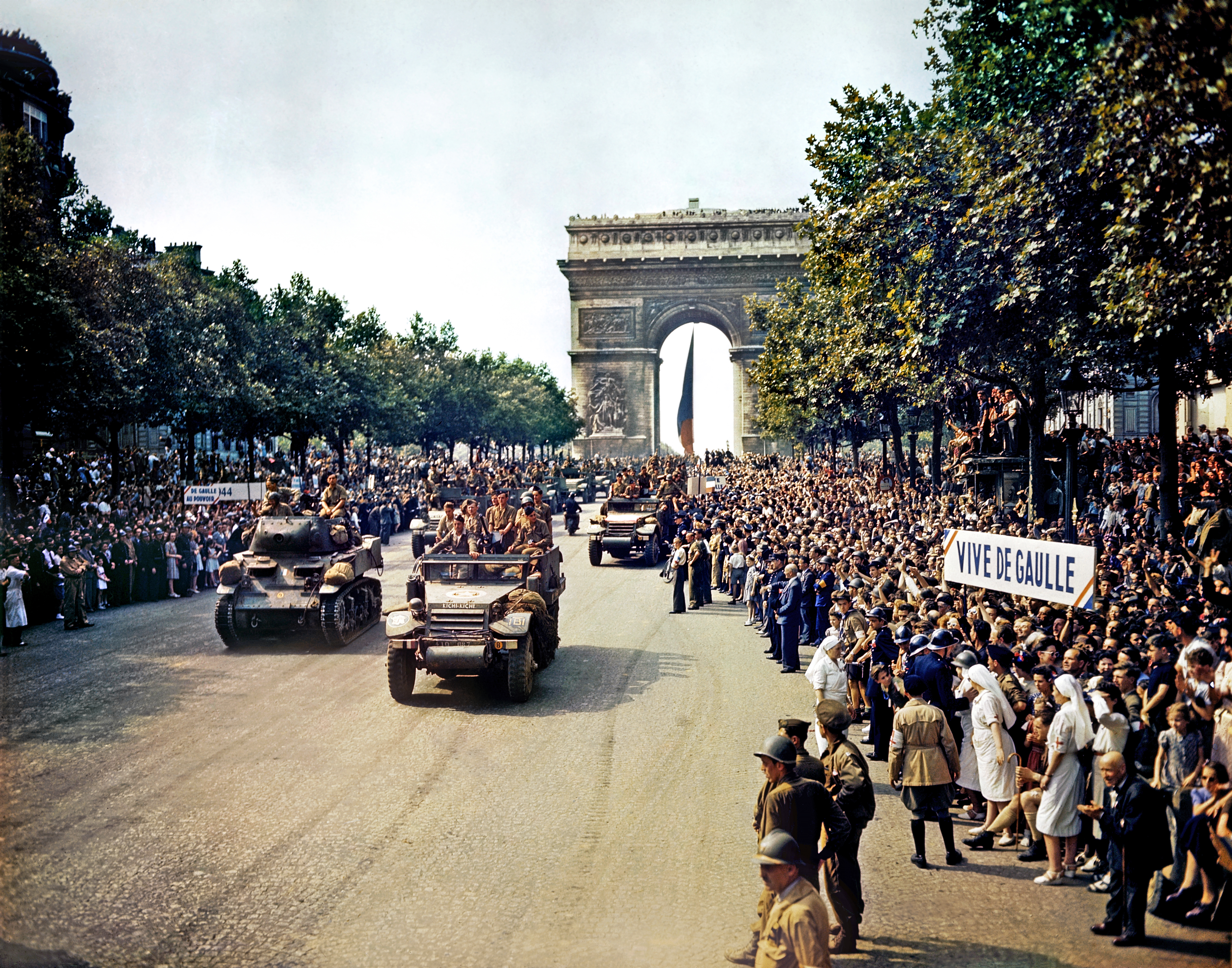
The 2nd Armored Division passes through the Arc de Triomphe. Signs read "Long live de Gaulle" and "De Gaulle to power".

It was fortunate for de Gaulle that the Germans had forcibly removed members of the Vichy government and taken them to Germany a few days earlier on 20 August; it allowed him to enter Paris as a liberator in the midst of the general euphoria, but there were serious concerns that communist elements of the resistance, which had done so much to clear the way for the military, would try to seize the opportunity to proclaim their own 'Peoples' Government' in the capital. De Gaulle made contact with Leclerc and demanded the presence of the 2nd Armoured Division to accompany him on a massed parade down the Champs-Élysées, "as much for prestige as for security". This was in spite of the fact that Leclerc's unit was fighting as part of the American 1st Army and were under strict orders to continue their next objective without obeying orders from anyone else. In the event, the American General Omar Bradley decided that Leclerc's division would be indispensable for the maintenance of order and the liquidation of the last pockets of resistance in the French capital. Earlier, on 21 August, de Gaulle had appointed his military advisor General Marie-Pierre Koenig as Governor of Paris.

As his procession came along the Place de la Concorde on Saturday 26 August, it came under machine gun fire by Vichy militia and fifth columnists. Later, on entering the Notre Dame Cathedral to be received as head of the provisional government by the Committee of Liberation, loud shots broke out again, and Leclerc and Koenig tried to hustle him through the door, but de Gaulle shook off their hands and never faltered. While the battle began outside, he walked slowly down the aisle. Before he had gone far a machine pistol fired down from above, at least two more joined in, and from below the FFI and police fired back. A BBC correspondent who was present reported;

... the General is being presented to the people. He is being received...they have opened fire! ... firing started all over the place ... that was one of the most dramatic scenes I have ever seen. ... General de Gaulle walked straight ahead into what appeared to me to be a hail of fire ... but he went straight ahead without hesitation, his shoulders flung back, and walked right down the centre aisle, even while the bullets were pouring about him. It was the most extraordinary example of courage I have ever seen ... there were bangs, flashes all about him, yet he seemed to have an absolutely charmed life.

De Gaulle himself though wrote, "There were no bullets whistling around my ears." (Aucune balle ne siffle à mes oreilles.) He thought the shots were probably over-excited troops firing at shadows. No culprits, if there were any, were ever identified.

Later, in the great hall of the Hôtel de Ville, de Gaulle was greeted by a jubilant crowd and, proclaiming the continuity of the Third Republic, delivered a famous proclamation;

Paris! Paris outraged, Paris broken, Paris martyred, but Paris liberated! Liberated by itself, liberated by its people with the assistance of the armies of France, with the support and assistance of the whole of France! ... The enemy is faltering but he is not yet beaten. He is still on our soil. It will not suffice that we, with the assistance of our dear and admirable allies, will have chased him from our home in order to be satisfied after what has happened. We want to enter his territory, as is fitting, as conquerors. ... It is for this revenge, this vengeance and this justice, that we will continue to fight until the last day, until the day of the total and complete victory.

That evening, the Wehrmacht launched a massive aerial and artillery barrage of Paris in revenge, leaving several thousand dead or injured. The situation in Paris remained tense, and a few days later de Gaulle, still unsure of the trend of events asked General Eisenhower to send some American troops into Paris as a show of strength. This he did 'not without some satisfaction', and so, on 29 August, the US 28th Infantry Division was rerouted from its journey to the front line and paraded down the Champs Elysees.

The same day, Washington and London agreed to accept the position of the Free French. The following day General Eisenhower gave his de facto blessing with a visit to the General in Paris.

== Administration of Free France ==
De Gaulle founded and headed several groups during the course of the war to administer operations of Free France.

=== Empire Defense Council ===
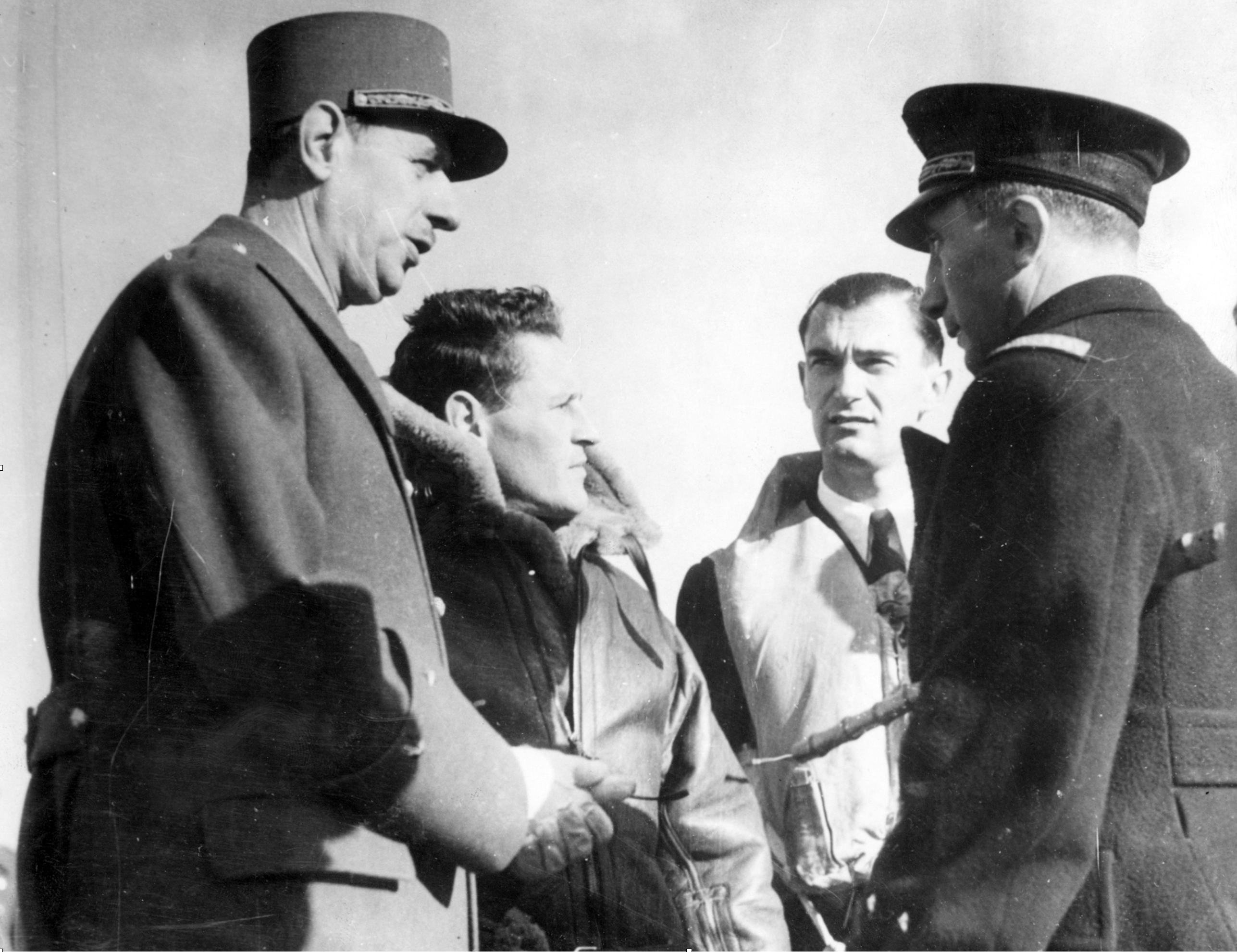
De Gaulle with Admiral Philippe de Scitivaux, pilot René Mouchotte, and Air Force general Martial Henri Valin

On 26 June 1940, four days after the Pétain government requested the armistice, General de Gaulle submitted a memorandum to the British government notifying Churchill of his decision to set up a Council of Defense of the Empire and formalizing the agreement reached with Churchill on 28 June. The formal recognition of the Empire Defense Council as a government in exile by the United Kingdom took place on 6 January 1941; recognition by the Soviet Union was published in December 1941, by exchange of letters.

=== French National Committee ===
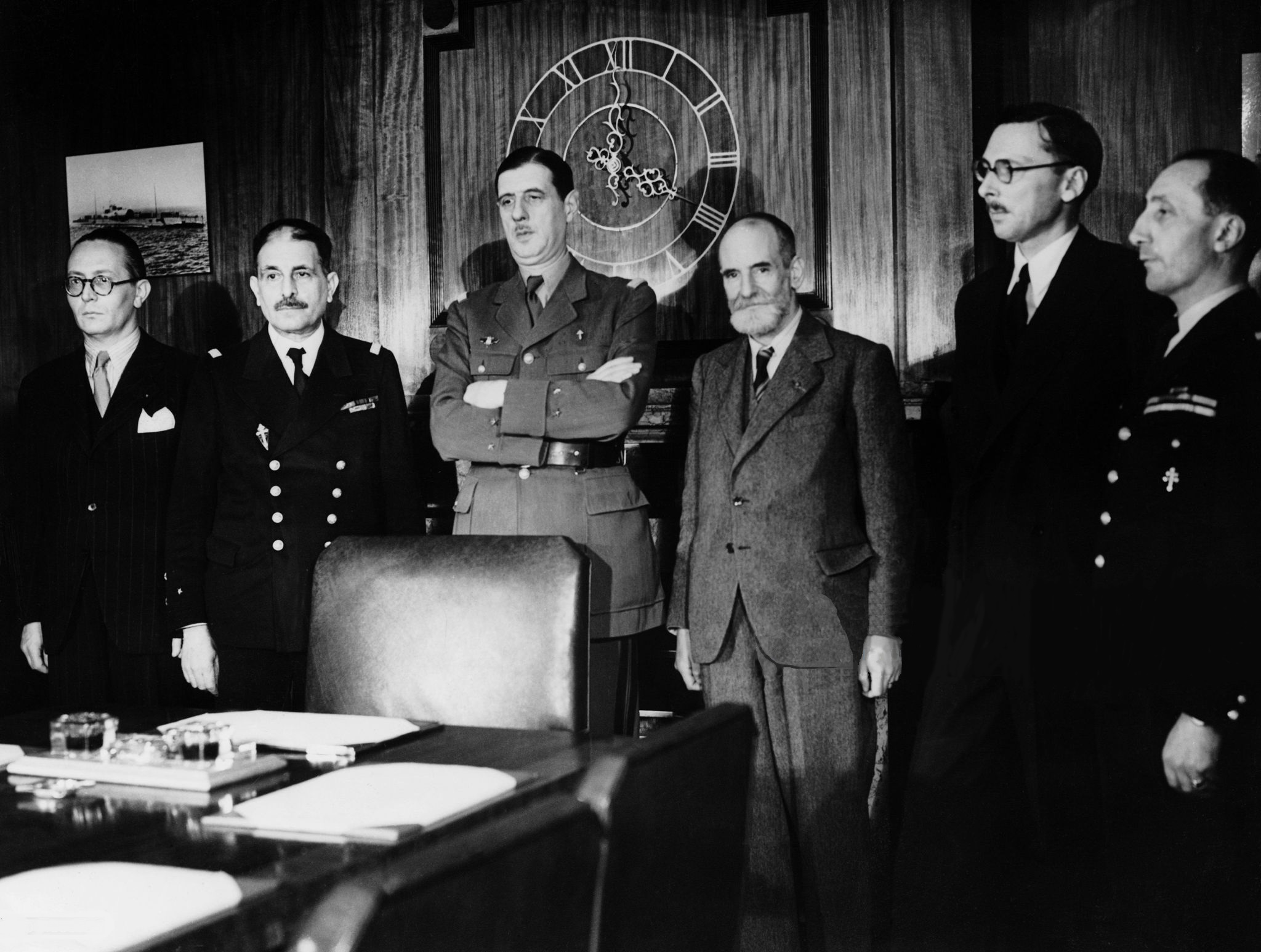
At a committee meeting in London: left to right Diethelm, Muselier, de Gaulle, Cassin, Pleven and Auboyneau (1942)

Winston Churchill suggested that de Gaulle create a committee, to lend an appearance of a more constitutionally based and less dictatorial authority and on 24 September 1941 de Gaulle created by edict the French National Committee as the successor organization to the smaller Empire Defense Council. According to historian Henri Bernard, De Gaulle went on to accept his proposal, but took care to exclude all his adversaries within the Free France movement, such as Émile Muselier, André Labarthe and others, retaining only "yes men" in the group.

The committee was the coordinating body which acted as the government-in-exile of Free France from 1941 to 1943. On 3 June 1943 it merged with the French Civil and Military High Command headed by Henri Giraud, becoming the new "French Committee of National Liberation".

=== National Resistance Council ===
De Gaulle, began seeking the formation of a committee to unify the resistance movements. On 1 January 1942, he delegated this task to Jean Moulin. Moulin achieved this on 27 May 1943, with the first meeting of the Conseil National de la Résistance in the 6th-arrondissement apartment of René Corbin on the second floor of 48, Rue du Four, in Paris.

=== French Committee of National Liberation ===
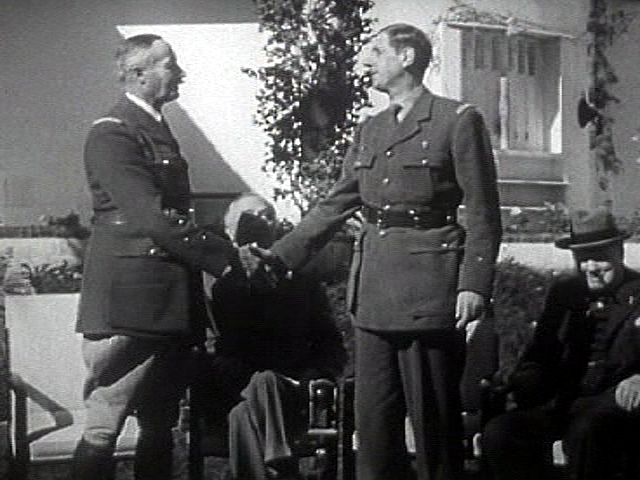
Henri Giraud and de Gaulle

The French Committee of National Liberation was a provisional government of Free France formed by generals Henri Giraud and Charles de Gaulle to provide united leadership, and organize and coordinate the campaign to liberate France. The committee was formed on 3 June 1943 and after a period of joint leadership came under the chairmanship of de Gaulle on 9 November. The committee directly challenged the legitimacy of the Vichy régime and unified the French forces that fought against the Nazis and their collaborators. The committee functioned as a provisional government for French Algeria (then a part of metropolitan France) and the liberated parts of the colonial empire.

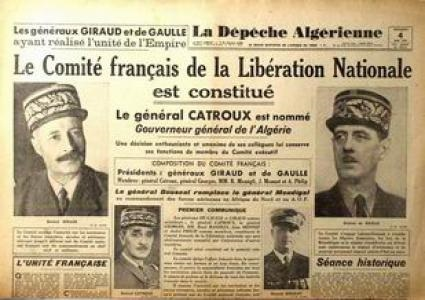
First page of La Dépêche algérienne headlining the creation of the French Committee of National Liberation 4 June 1943

The committee was formed on 3 June 1943 in Algiers, the capital of French Algeria. Giraud and de Gaulle served jointly as co-presidents of the committee. The charter of the body affirmed its commitment to "re-establish all French liberties, the laws of the Republic and the Republican régime." The committee saw itself as a source of unity and representation for the French nation. The Vichy regime was decried as illegitimate over its collaboration with Nazi Germany. The committee received mixed responses from the Allies; the U.S. considered it a war-time body with restricted functions, different from a future government of liberated France. The Committee soon expanded its membership, developed a distinctive administrative body and incorporated as the Provisional Consultative Assembly, creating an organized, representative government within itself. With Allied recognition, the committee and its leaders Giraud and de Gaulle enjoyed considerable popular support within France and the French resistance, thus becoming the forerunners in the process to form a provisional government for France as liberation approached. However, Charles de Gaulle politically outmaneuvered Gen. Giraud, and asserted complete control and leadership over the committee.

In September, Allied forces recognized the committee as the legitimate provisional government of France, whereupon the Committee reorganized itself as the Provisional Government of the French Republic under the presidency of Charles de Gaulle and began the process of writing a new Constitution which would become the basis of the French Fourth Republic.

=== Provisional Consultative Assembly ===
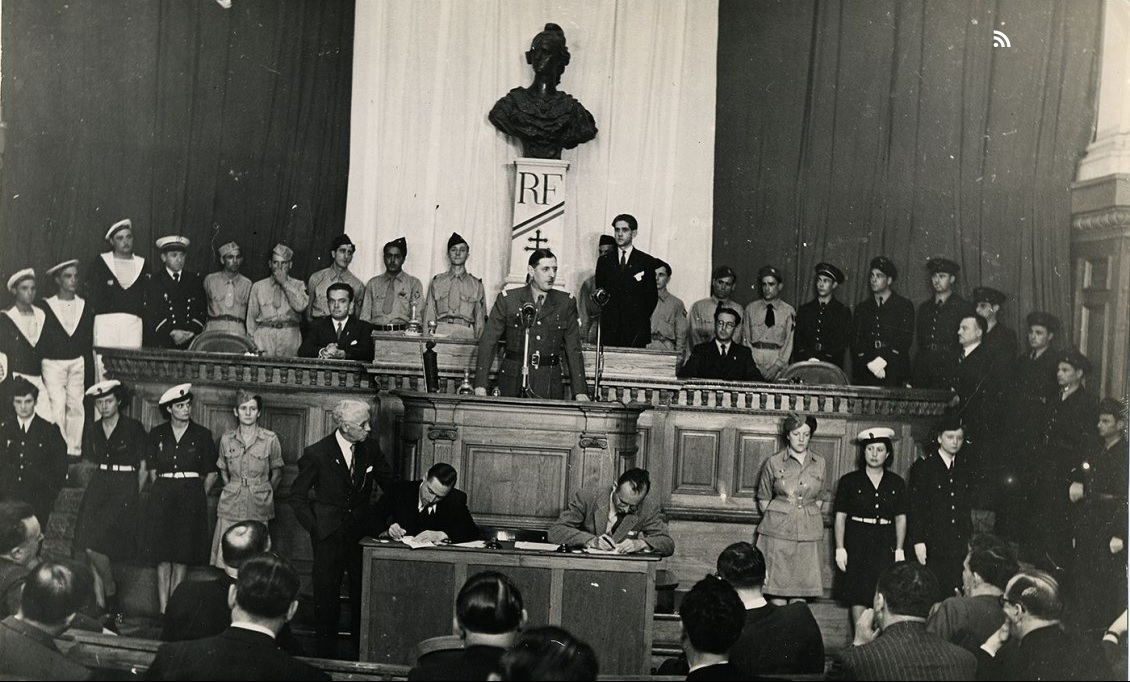
Inaugural session of the Provisional Consultative Assembly in the presence of General de Gaulle. Palais Carnot, Algiers, 3 November 1943

The Provisional Consultative Assembly was set up in September 1943 in Algiers to advise the committee and to help provide a legal basis to the institutions being set up to represent the French people, at a time when the country itself and its laws represented the enemy. After the liberation of Paris in August 1944, the Committee moved to Paris and was reorganized as the Provisional Government of the French Republic under the presidency of Charles de Gaulle. The Provisional Government guided the French war and diplomatic efforts through liberation and the end of the war, until a new Constitution was written and approved in a referendum, establishing of the Fourth Republic in October 1946.

The Provisional Consultative Assembly was a governmental organ of Free France that was created by and operated under the aegis of the French Committee of National Liberation (CFLN). It began in north Africa and held meetings in Algiers until it moved to Paris in July 1944. Led by Charles de Gaulle, it was an attempt to provide some sort of representative, democratic accountability to the institutions being set up to represent the French people, at a time when the country itself and its laws were dissolved and its territory occupied or coopted by a puppet state.

The members of the Assembly represented the French resistance movements, political parties, and territories that were engaged against Germany in the Second World War alongside the Allies.

Established by ordinance on 17 September 1943 by the CFLN, it held its first meetings in Algiers, at the Palais Carnot (the former headquarters of the Financial Delegations), between 3 November 1943 and 25 July 1944. On 3 June 1944 it was placed under the authority of the Provisional Government of the French Republic (GPRF), which succeeded the CFLN.

In his inaugural speech, de Gaulle gave the body his imprimatur, as providing a means of representing the people of France as democratically and legally as possible under difficult and unparalleled circumstances, until such time as democracy could once again be restored. As an indication of the importance he attached to the body, de Gaulle participated in about twenty sessions of the Consultative Assembly in Algiers. On 26 June 1944, he came to report on the military situation after the D-Day landings, and on 25 July, he was present at its last session on African soil before its move to Paris.

Restructured and expanded after the liberation of France, it held sessions in Paris at the Palais du Luxembourg between 7 November 1944 and 3 August 1945.

== Provisional Government ==
Roosevelt insisted that an Allied Military Government for Occupied Territories (AMGOT) should be implemented in France, but this was opposed by both the Secretary of War and the Under-Secretary for War, as well as by Eisenhower, who had been strongly opposed to the imposition of AMGOT in North Africa. Eisenhower, unlike Roosevelt, wanted to cooperate with de Gaulle, and he secured a last-minute promise from the President on the eve of D-Day that the Allied officers would not act as military governors and would instead cooperate with the local authorities as the Allied forces liberated French Territory. De Gaulle would later claim in his memoirs that he blocked AMGOT.

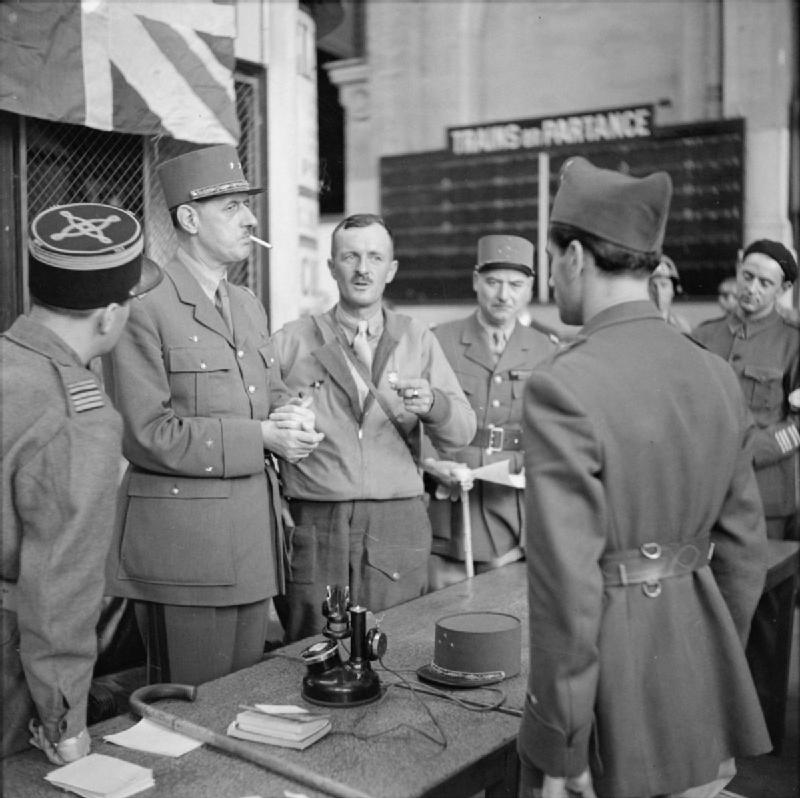
General de Gaulle with General Leclerc and other French officers at Montparnasse railway station in Paris, 25 August 1944

With the prewar parties and most of their leaders discredited, there was little opposition to de Gaulle and his associates forming an interim administration. In order not to be seen as presuming on his position in such austere times, de Gaulle did not use one of the grand official residences such as Hotel de Matignon or the presidential palace on the Elysee, but resided briefly in his old office at the War Ministry. When he was joined by his wife and daughters a short while later, they moved into a small state-owned villa on edge of Bois de Boulogne which had once been set aside for Hermann Göring.

Living conditions immediately after the liberation were even worse than under German rule. About 25% of the city was in ruins and public services and fuel were almost nonexistent. Large-scale public demonstrations erupted all over France, protesting the apparent lack of action at improving the supply of food, while in Normandy, bakeries were pillaged. The problem was not French agriculture, which had largely continued operating without problems, but the near-total breakdown of the country's infrastructure. Large areas of track had been destroyed by bombing, most modern equipment, rolling stock, lorries and farm animals had been taken to Germany and all the bridges over the Seine, the Loire and the Rhone between Paris and the sea had been destroyed. The black market pushed real prices to four times the level of 1939, causing the government to print money to try to improve the money supply, which only added to inflation.

On 10 November 1944, Churchill flew to Paris to a reception by de Gaulle and the two together were greeted by thousands of cheering Parisians on the next day. Harold Nicolson stated that Anthony Eden told him that "not for one moment did Winston stop crying, and that he could have filled buckets by the time he received the Freedom of Paris." He said "they yelled for Churchill in a way that he has never heard any crowd yell before." At an official luncheon, de Gaulle said, "It is true that we would not have seen [the liberation] if our old and gallant ally England, and all the British dominions under precisely the impulsion and inspiration of those we are honouring today, had not deployed the extraordinary determination to win, and that magnificent courage which saved the freedom of the world. There is no French man or woman who is not touched to the depths of their hearts and souls by this."

=== Curbing the Communist Resistance ===
After the celebrations had died down, de Gaulle began conferring with leading Resistance figures who, with the Germans gone, intended to continue as a political and military force, and asked to be given a government building to serve as their headquarters. The Resistance, in which the Communists were competing with other trends for leadership, had developed its own manifesto for social and political change known as the National Council of the Resistance (CNR) Charter, and wanted special status to enter the army under their own flags, ranks and honours. Despite their decisive support in backing him against Giraud, de Gaulle disappointed some of the Resistance leaders by telling them that although their efforts and sacrifices had been recognised, they had no further role to play and, that unless they joined the regular army, they should lay down their arms and return to civilian life.

Believing them to be a dangerous revolutionary force, de Gaulle moved to break up the liberation committees and other militias. The communists were not only extremely active, but they received a level of popular support that disturbed de Gaulle. As early as May 1943, the US Secretary of State Cordell Hull had written to Roosevelt urging him to take action to attempt to curb the rise of communism in France.

=== Provisional Government of the French Republic ===
On 10 September 1944 the Provisional Government of the French Republic, or Government of National Unanimity, formed. It included many of de Gaulle's Free French associates such as Gaston Palewski, Claude Guy, Claude Mauriac and Jacques Soustelle, together with members of the main parties, which included the Socialists and a new Christian Democratic Party, the MRP under the leadership of Georges Bidault, who served as Foreign Minister. The president of the prewar Senate Jules Jeanneney was brought back as second-ranking member, but because of their links with Russia, de Gaulle allowed the Communists only two minor positions in his government. While they were now a major political force with over a million members, of the full cabinet of 22 men, only Augustin Laurent and Charles Tillon—who as head of Francs-Tireurs et Partisans had been one of the most active members of the resistance—were given ministries. However, de Gaulle did pardon the Communists' leader Maurice Thorez, who had been sentenced to death in absentia by the French government for desertion. On his return home from Russia, Thorez delivered a speech supporting de Gaulle in which he said that for the present, the war against Germany was the only task that mattered.

There were also a number of new faces in the government, including a literary academic, Georges Pompidou, who had written to one of de Gaulle's recruiting agents offering his services, and Jean Monnet, who in spite of his past opposition to the General now recognized the need for unity and served as Commissioner for Economic Planning. Of equal rank to ministers and answerable only to the prime minister, a number of Commissioners of the Republic (Commissaires de la République) were appointed to re-establish the democratic institutions of France and to extend the legitimacy of the provisional government. A number of former Free French associates served as commissioners, including Henri Fréville, Raymond Aubrac and Michel Debré, who was charged with reforming the civil service. Controversially, de Gaulle also appointed Maurice Papon as Commissioner for Aquitaine in spite of his involvement in the deportation of Jews while serving as a senior police official in the Vichy regime during the occupation. (Over the years, Papon remained in high official positions but continued to be implicated in controversial events such as the Paris massacre of 1961, eventually being convicted of crimes against humanity in 1998.)

In social policy, legislation was introduced in February 1945 that provided for the establishment of works committees in all private industrial establishments employing more than 50 (originally more than 100) people.

=== Tour of major cities ===
De Gaulle's policy was to postpone elections as long as 2.6 million French were in Germany as prisoners of war and forced laborers. In mid-September, he embarked upon a tour of major provincial cities to increase his public profile and to help cement his position. Although he received a largely positive reception from the crowds who came out to see him, he reflected that only a few months previously the very same people had come out to cheer Marshal Pétain when he was serving the Vichy regime. Raymond Aubrac said that the General showed himself to be ill-at-ease at social functions; in Marseille and Lyon he became irate when he had to sit next to former Resistance leaders and also voiced his distaste for the rowdy, libidinous behavior of French youths during the Maquisard parades which preceded his speech. When he reached Toulouse, de Gaulle also had to confront the leaders of a group which had proclaimed themselves to be the provincial government of the city.

During the tour, de Gaulle showed his customary lack of concern for his own safety by mixing with the crowds and thus making himself an easy target for an assassin. Although he was naturally shy, the good use of amplification and patriotic music enabled him to deliver his message that though all of France was fragmented and suffering, together they would rise again. During every speech he would stop halfway through to invite the crowd to join him in singing La Marseillaise, before continuing and finishing by raising his hands in the air and crying "Vive la France!"

=== Legal purges (Épuration légale) ===
As the war entered the final stages, the nation was forced to confront the reality of how many of its people had behaved under German rule. In France, collaborators were more severely punished than in most other occupied countries. Immediately after the liberation, countless women accused of aiding, abetting, and taking German soldiers as lovers were subjected to public humiliations such as being shaved bald and paraded through the streets in their underwear. Many others were simply attacked by lynch mobs. With so many of their former members having been hunted down and killed by the Nazis and paramilitary Milice, the Partisans had already summarily executed an estimated 4,500 people, and the Communists in particular continued to press for severe action against collaborators. In Paris alone, over 150,000 people were at some time detained on suspicion of collaboration, although most were later released. Famous figures accused included the industrialist Louis Renault, the actress Arletty, who had lived openly with a German officer in the Ritz, the opera star Tino Rossi, the chanteuse Édith Piaf, the stage actor Sacha Guitry and Coco Chanel, who was briefly detained but fled to Switzerland.

Keenly aware of the need to seize the initiative and to get the process under firm judicial control, de Gaulle appointed Justice Minister François de Menthon to lead the Legal Purge (Épuration légale) to punish traitors and to clear away the traces of the Vichy regime. Knowing that he would need to reprieve many of the 'economic collaborators'—such as police and civil servants who held minor roles under Vichy in order to keep the country running as normally as possible—he assumed, as head of state, the right to commute death sentences. Of the near 2,000 people who received the death sentence from the courts, fewer than 800 were executed. De Gaulle commuted 998 of the 1,554 capital sentences submitted before him, including all those involving women. Many others were given jail terms or had their voting rights and other legal privileges taken away. It is generally agreed that the purges were conducted arbitrarily, with often absurdly severe or overly lenient punishments being handed down. It was also notable that the less well-off people who were unable to pay for lawyers were more harshly treated. As time went by and feelings grew less intense, a number of people who had held fairly senior positions under the Vichy government—such as Maurice Papon and René Bousquet—escaped consequences by claiming to have worked secretly for the resistance or to have played a double game, working for the good of France by serving the established order.

Later, there was the question of what to do with the former Vichy leaders when they were finally returned to France. Marshal Pétain and Maxime Weygand were war heroes from World War I and were now extremely old; convicted of treason, Pétain received a death sentence which his old protégé de Gaulle commuted to life imprisonment, while Weygand was eventually acquitted. Three Vichy leaders were executed. Joseph Darnand, who became an SS officer and led the Milice paramilitaries who hunted down members of the Resistance, was executed in October 1945. Fernand de Brinon, the third-ranking Vichy official, was found guilty of war crimes and executed in April 1947. The two trials of the most infamous collaborator of all, Pierre Laval, who was heavily implicated in the murder of Jews, were widely criticised as being unfair for depriving him of the opportunity to properly defend himself, although Laval antagonized the court throughout with his bizarre behavior. He was found guilty of treason in May 1945 and de Gaulle was adamant that there would be no commuting the death sentence, saying that Laval's execution was "an indispensable symbolic gesture required for reasons of state". There was a widespread belief, particularly in the years that followed, that de Gaulle was trying to appease both the Third Republic politicians and the former Vichy leaders who had made Laval their scapegoat.

=== Winter of 1944 ===
The winter of 1944–45 was especially difficult for most of the population. Inflation showed no sign of slowing down and food shortages were severe. The prime minister and the other Gaullists were forced to try to balance the desires of ordinary people and public servants for a return to normal life with pressure from Bidault's MRP and the Communists for the large scale nationalisation programme and other social changes that formed the main tenets of the CNR Charter. At the end of 1944 the coal industry and other energy companies were nationalised, followed shortly afterwards by major banks and finance houses, the merchant navy, the main aircraft manufacturers, airlines and a number of major private enterprises such as the Renault car company at Boulogne-Billancourt, whose owner had been implicated as a collaborator and accused of having made huge profits working for the Nazis. In some cases, unions, feeling that things were not progressing quickly enough, took matters into their own hands, occupying premises and setting up workers' committees to run the companies. Women were also allowed the vote for the first time, a new social security system was introduced to cover most medical costs, unions were expanded and price controls introduced to try to curb inflation. At de Gaulle's request, the newspaper Le Monde was founded in December 1944 to provide France with a quality daily journal similar to those in other countries. Le Monde took over the premises and facilities of the older Le Temps, whose independence and reputation had been badly compromised during the Vichy years.

During this period there were a number of minor disagreements between the French and the other Allies. The British ambassador to France Duff Cooper said that de Gaulle seemed to seek out real or imagined insults to take offence at whatever possible. De Gaulle believed Britain and the US were intending to keep their armies in France after the war and were secretly working to take over its overseas possessions and to prevent it from regaining its political and economic strength. In late October he complained that the Allies were failing to adequately arm and equip the new French army and instructed Bidault to use the French veto at the European Council.

On Armistice Day in 1945, Winston Churchill made his first visit to France since the liberation and received a good reception in Paris where he laid a wreath to Georges Clemenceau. The occasion also marked the first official appearance of de Gaulle's wife Yvonne, but the visit was less friendly than it appeared. De Gaulle had instructed that there be no excessive displays of public affection towards Churchill and no official awards without his prior agreement. When crowds cheered Churchill during a parade down the Elysee, de Gaulle was heard to remark, "Fools and cretins! Look at the rabble cheering the old bandit".

=== Visit to the Soviet Union ===
With the Russian forces making more rapid advances into German-held territory than the West, there was a sudden public realisation that the Soviet Union was about to dominate large parts of eastern Europe. In fact, in October 1944, Churchill had reluctantly agreed to allow Bulgaria and Romania, already occupied by the Red Army, and Hungary to fall under the Soviet sphere of influence after the war, with shared influence in Yugoslavia. The UK was to retain hegemony over Greece, although there had been no agreement over Poland, whose eastern territories were already in Soviet hands under the Molotov–Ribbentrop Pact with Germany, and which retained a government in exile in London. De Gaulle had not been invited to any of the 'Big Three' Conferences, although the decisions made by Stalin, Churchill and Roosevelt in dividing up Europe were of huge importance to France.

De Gaulle and his Foreign Minister Bidault stated that they were not in favour of a 'Western Bloc' that would be separate from the rest of Europe, and hoped that a resurgent France might be able to act as a 'third force' in Europe to temper the ambitions of the two emerging superpowers, America and Soviet Union. He began seeking an audience with Stalin to press his 'facing both ways' policy, and finally received an invitation in late 1944. In his memoirs, de Gaulle devoted 24 pages to his visit to the Soviet Union, but a number of writers make the point that his version of events differs significantly from that of the Soviets, of foreign news correspondents, and with their own eyewitness accounts.

De Gaulle wanted access to German coal in the Ruhr as reparations after the war, the left bank of the Rhine to be incorporated into French territory, and for the Oder-Neisse line in Poland to become Germany's official eastern border. De Gaulle began by requesting that France enter into a treaty with the Soviet Union on this basis, but Stalin, who remained in constant contact with Churchill throughout the visit, said that it would be impossible to make such an agreement without the consent of Britain and America. He suggested that it might be possible to add France's name to the existing Anglo-Soviet Agreement if they agreed to recognise the Soviet-backed provisional Polish government known as the Lublin Committee as rightful rulers of Poland, but de Gaulle refused on the grounds that this would be 'un-French', as it would mean it being a junior partner in an alliance. During the visit, de Gaulle accompanied the deputy Soviet leader Vyacheslav Molotov on a tour of the former battleground at Stalingrad, where he was deeply moved at the scene of carnage he witnessed and surprised Molotov by referring to "our joint sacrifice".

Though the treaty which was eventually signed by Bidault and Molotov carried symbolic importance in that it enabled de Gaulle to demonstrate that he was recognised as the official head of state and show that France's voice was being heard abroad, it was of little relevance to Stalin due to France's lack of real political and military power; it did not affect the outcome of the post-war settlement. Stalin later commented that like Churchill and Roosevelt, he found de Gaulle to be awkward and stubborn and believed that he was 'not a complicated person' (by which he meant that he was an old-style nationalist). Stalin also felt that he lacked realism in claiming the same rights as the major powers and did not object to Roosevelt's refusal to allow de Gaulle to attend the 'Big Three' conferences that were to come at Yalta and Potsdam.

=== Strasbourg ===
At the end of 1944 French forces continued to advance as part of the American armies, but during the Ardennes Offensive there was a dispute over Eisenhower's order to French troops to evacuate Strasbourg, which had just been liberated so as to straighten the defensive line against the German counterattack. Strasbourg was an important political and psychological symbol of French sovereignty in Alsace and Lorraine, and de Gaulle, saying that its loss would bring down the government, refused to allow a retreat, predicting that "Strasbourg will be our Stalingrad".

By early 1945 it was clear that the price controls which had been introduced to control inflation had only served to boost the black market and prices continued to move ever upwards. By this time the army had swelled to over 1.2 million men and almost half of state expenditure was going to military spending. De Gaulle was faced with his first major ministerial dispute when the very able but tough-minded economics minister Pierre Mendès France demanded a programme of severe monetary reform which was opposed by the Finance Ministry headed by Aime Lepercq, who favoured a programme of heavy borrowing to stimulate the economy. When de Gaulle, knowing there would be little appetite for further austerity measures sided with Lepercq, Mendès France tendered his resignation, which was rejected because de Gaulle knew he needed him. Lepercq was killed in a road accident a short time afterwards and was succeeded by Pleven, but when in March, Mendès France asked unsuccessfully for taxes on capital earnings and for the blocking of certain bank accounts, he again offered his resignation and it was accepted.

=== Yalta Conference ===
De Gaulle was never invited to the summit conferences of Allied leaders such as Yalta and Potsdam. He never forgave the Big Three leaders (Churchill, Roosevelt and Stalin) for their neglect and continued to rage against it as having been a negative factor in European politics for the rest of his life.

After the Rhine crossings, the French First Army captured a large section of territory in southern Germany, but although this later allowed France to play a part in the signing of the German surrender, Roosevelt in particular refused to allow any discussion about de Gaulle participating in the Big Three conferences that would shape Europe in the post-war world. Churchill pressed hard for France to be included 'at the inter-allied table', but on 6 December 1944 the American president wired both Stalin and Churchill to say that de Gaulle's presence would "merely introduce a complicating and undesirable factor".

At the Yalta Conference in February 1945, despite Stalin's opposition, Churchill and Roosevelt insisted that France be allowed a post-war occupation zone in Germany, and also made sure that it was included among the five nations that invited others to the conference to establish the United Nations. This was important because it guaranteed France a permanent seat on the UN Security Council, a prestigious position that, despite pressure from emerging nations, it still holds today.

=== President Truman ===
On his way back from Yalta, Roosevelt asked de Gaulle to meet him in Algiers for talks. The General refused, believing that there was nothing more to be said, and for this he received a rebuke from Georges Bidault and from the French press, and a severely angered Roosevelt criticised de Gaulle to Congress. Soon after, on 12 April 1945, Roosevelt died, and despite their uneasy relationship de Gaulle declared a week of mourning in France and forwarded an emotional and conciliatory letter to the new American president, Harry S. Truman, in which he said of Roosevelt, "all of France loved him".

De Gaulle's relationship with Truman was to prove just as difficult as it had been with Roosevelt. With Allied forces advancing deep into Germany, another serious situation developed between American and French forces in Stuttgart and Karlsruhe, when French soldiers were ordered to transfer the occupation zones to US troops. Wishing to retain as much German territory in French hands as possible, de Gaulle ordered his troops, who were using American weapons and ammunition, to resist, and an armed confrontation seemed imminent. Truman threatened to cut off supplies to the French army and to take the zones by force, leaving de Gaulle with little choice but to back down. De Gaulle never forgave Truman and hinted he would work closely with Stalin, leading Truman to tell his staff, "I don't like the son of a bitch."

The first visit by de Gaulle to Truman in the U.S. was not a success. Truman told his visitor that it was time that the French got rid of the Communist influence from its government, to which de Gaulle replied that this was France's own business. But Truman, who admitted that his feelings towards the French were becoming "less and less friendly", went on to say that under the circumstances, the French could not expect much economic aid and refused to accept de Gaulle's request for control of the west bank of the Rhine. During the argument which followed, de Gaulle reminded Truman that the US was using the French port of Nouméa in New Caledonia as a base against the Japanese.

== Victory in Europe ==
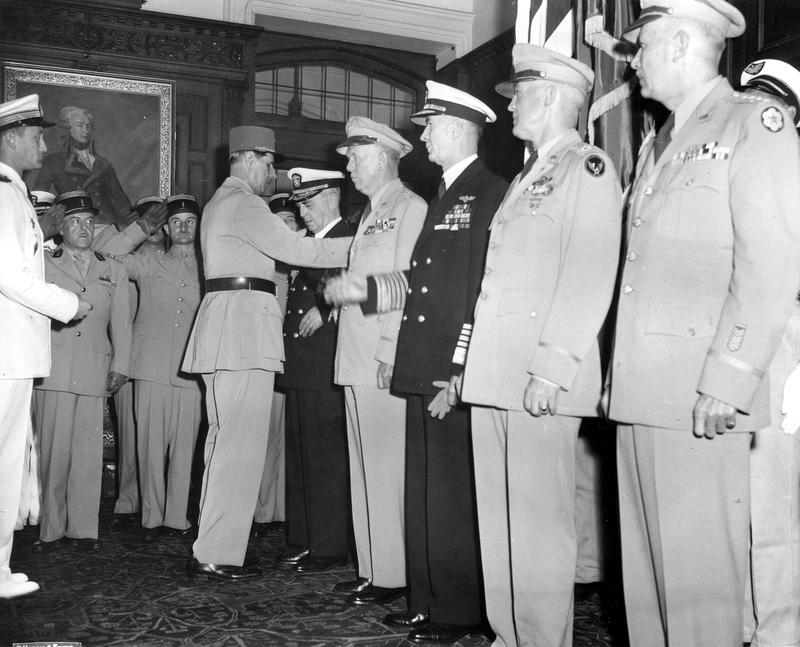
De Gaulle presenting the Legion of Honour to American Army and Navy officers William D. Leahy, George C. Marshall, Ernest J. King, Henry H. Arnold and Brehon B. Somervell

In May 1945 the German armies surrendered to the Americans and British at Rheims, and a separate armistice was signed with France in Berlin. De Gaulle refused to allow any British participation in the victory parade in Paris. However, among the vehicles that took part was an ambulance from the Hadfield-Spears Ambulance Unit, staffed by French doctors and British nurses. One of the nurses was Mary Spears, who had set up the unit and had worked almost continuously since the Battle of France with Free French forces in the Middle East, North Africa and Italy. Mary's husband was General Edward Spears, the British liaison to the Free French who had personally spirited de Gaulle to safety in Britain in 1940. When de Gaulle saw the Union Flags and Tricolours side by side on the ambulance, and heard French soldiers cheering, "Voilà Spears! Vive Spears!", he ordered that the unit be closed down immediately and its British staff sent home. A number of French troops returned their medals in protest and Mary wrote, "it is a pitiful business when a great man suddenly becomes small."

Another confrontation with the Americans broke out soon after the armistice when the French sent troops to occupy the French-speaking Italian border region of Val d'Aoste. The French commander threatened to open fire on American troops if they tried to stop them, and an irate Truman ordered the immediate end to all arms shipments to France. Truman sent de Gaulle an angry letter saying that he found it unbelievable that the French could threaten to attack American troops after they had done so much to liberate France.

However, de Gaulle was generally well received in the United States immediately after World War II and supported the United States in public comments. He visited New York City on 27 August 1945 to great welcome by thousands of people of the city and its mayor Fiorello La Guardia. On that day, de Gaulle wished "Long live the United States of America". He visited New York City Hall and Idlewild Airport (now John F. Kennedy International Airport), and presented LaGuardia with the Grand Croix of the Legion of Honour award.

== See also ==
- Winston Churchill in the Second World War
- Ulysses S. Grant and the American Civil War
