= Sarfati =

Sarfati (Hebrew: צרפתי, Israeli pronunciation: [tsaʁfaˈti]), variously transliterated and spelled Sarfatti, Sarphati, Serfaty, Serfati, Sarfate, Sarfaty, Sarfity, Zarfati, Tsarfati, Tsarfaty, Tzarfati, or as the noun tzarfatit (Hebrew: צרפתית), is a Sephardic Jewish surname and a geographical demonym.

The surname literally means "Gallic" or "French", and is derived from Tzarfat, the Biblical placename for Gaul, which in later times was identified in Jewish tradition as France. The Hebrew adjective tzarfati was frequently applied in rabbinical literature to Jews of French birth or descent.

== Origin ==
One account places the origin of the surname as being linked to Rashi by way of his grandson Rabbeinu Tam, but the connection, although anchored in the Ketubot traditions, has never been fully proven due to a gap of seven generations in the genealogy after Jews were expelled from France by Philippe le Bel in the year 1306. After imprisoning many Jews and confiscating their properties, the French crown then used the wealth it seized from Jews to solve its fiscal and monetary problems, which had become chronic since the time of the Crusades.

In any case, numerous bearers of this name (whose ancestors came from France) lived in various parts of the Iberian Peninsula during the 14th-15th centuries, when they appeared in Spanish and Portuguese documents under the spellings Sarfati and Çarfati. During the 15th century and especially after the expulsion of Jews from these countries in the 1490s, some branches migrated from the Iberian Peninsula to North Africa, while others moved to Rome, Livorno and the Ottoman Empire.

== List ==
Notable people with the surname include:

=== Sarfati ===
- Diana Sarfati, New Zealand public health doctor and epidemiologist
- Georges-Elia Sarfati, philosopher, linguist, poet, and an existentialist psychoanalyst
- Jonathan Sarfati (born 1964), Australian–New Zealander chess player and creationist author
- Lea Michele Sarfati (born 1986), American singer and actress, Broadway performer and star of TV show "Glee"
- Lise Sarfati (born 1958), French photographer
- Lydia Sarfati, Polish-born American esthetician, entrepreneur, consultant and author
- Samuel Sarfati (died c. 1519), Italian physician to Popes Alexander VI and Julius II and leader of the Jewish community in Rome
- Semah Sarfati (1624–1717) Tunisian rabbi who was chief rabbi of Tunisia
- Sonia Sarfati (born 1960), French author and journalist
- Tzedi Tzarfati (born 1941), Israeli television presenter and theatre director
- Yitzhak Sarfati, 15th century Ottoman rabbi

=== Sarfatti ===
- Anna Sarfatti (born 1950), Italian writer of children's books
- Jack Sarfatti (born 1939), American theoretical physicist and writer
- Margherita Sarfatti (1880–1961), Italian journalist and lover of Benito Mussolini
- Riccardo Sarfatti (1940–2010), Italian architect and politician in Lombardy

=== Sarfate ===
- Dennis Sarfate (born 1981), American baseball player

=== Sarfaty ===
- Gretta Sarfaty Marchant (born 1947), British-Brazilian artist and curator
- Perla Serfaty (born 1944), Moroccan-born French and Canadian academic, sociologist, psychosociologist, writer
- Regina Sarfaty (1934–2024), American operatic mezzo-soprano

=== Sarfatty ===
- Bouena Sarfatty (1916–1997), Greek-Jewish World War II partisan and poet

=== Sarphati ===
- Samuel Sarphati (1813–1866), Dutch physician and city planner

=== Serfaty ===
- Abraham Serfaty (1926–2010), Moroccan political activist and dissident
- Abraham Serfaty (Gibraltarian), former Mayor of Gibraltar
- Christine Daure-Serfaty (1926–2014), French-Moroccan activist
- Dan Serfaty (born 1966) is a French entrepreneur and businessman
- Isaac Chocrón Serfaty (1930–2011), Venezuelan playwright
- Rosalinda Serfaty (born 1969), Argentine-born Venezuelan actress
- Sylvia Serfaty, French Mathematician, winner of the 2004 EMS Prize for her contributions to the Ginzburg–Landau theory
- Willa Vasquez Serfaty, Gibraltarian artist

== See also ==
- Olry Terquem (1782–1862), who wrote under the pseudonym "Tsarphati"
- Tzarfati (surname)
