= Jackie Tzarfati =

Israeli footballer

Jackie Tzarfati ג'קי צרפתי
Personal information
- Full name: Jackie Tzarfati
- Date of birth: January 14, 1969 (age 57)
- Place of birth: Tel Aviv, Israel
- Position: Defensive midfielder

Senior career*
Years	Team	Apps	(Gls)
1987–1992	Maccabi Tel Aviv	102	(7)
1992–1993	Maccabi Herzliya		(9)
1993–1995	Maccabi Yavne		(16)
1995–1996	Hapoel Ramat Gan		(4)
1996–1997	Hapoel Bat Yam		(5)
2001	Hapoel Nahlat Yehuda		
- * Club domestic league appearances and goals

Jackie Tzarfati (Hebrew: ג'קי צרפתי) is a retired Israeli footballer who is mainly known for playing in Maccabi Tel Aviv.

Jackie's father Sami and younger brother Guy were also professional footballers.

== Honours ==
- Israel State Cup (1):
  - 1988
