= Olivia Jordan (interpreter) =

British wartime ambulance driver then interpreter and driver (1919–2021)

- Born: Olivia Matthews; 28 January 1919; Bushey, United Kingdom
- Died: 19 August 2021 (aged 102)
- Known for: work in Second World War; ambulance driver and interpreter; Croix de Guerre 1939-1945

Olivia Jordan (née Matthews; 28 January 1919 – 19 August 2021) was an ambulance driver in France at the start of the Second World War. She was the driver and interpreter for Charles de Gaulle in London from 1940 to 1943.

== Personal life ==
Olivia Matthews was born 28 January 1919 in Bushey, Hertfordshire and grew up in Kent. She was the fourth daughter of Christabel (born Stogdon) and Trevor Matthews, the chairman of Grindlays Bank. She was educated at boarding school at Downe House School, Berkshire and with a French governess. In 1937 she attended a finishing school in Germany and saw Adolf Hitler in a tearoom during a visit to Munich, before he came to international significance. Her education resulted in her being fluent in English, French and German.

In 1943 she married Peter Jordan, an architect. She then ceased working. They had two children and divorced after 25 years. She was a keen horse rider into her 90s. In her later years Jordan lived in the Elmbridge Retirement Village in Cranleigh, Sussex. She died 19 August 2021, at the age of 102.

== Work during Second World War ==
Eager to become involved, she travelled to France in January 1940. With help from General Pierre Héring, the military governor of Paris, who was the father of one of her friends, she joined the Sections Sanitaires Automobiles Féminines. This was a medical unit within the French army. It was managed by the Red Cross.

After minimal training in driving and nursing, she was sent north towards the Maginot Line, as the German army advanced rapidly. Under the banner of the Red Cross, the medical unit treated both German and Allied troops. In June 1940, she was ordered south in a convoy that came under German attack outside Clermont-Ferrand in central France. After the armistice, she traveled alone further south seeking to return to Great Britain. During this journey she was given papers to take to Charles de Gaulle. She finally boarded a destroyer with Polish troops, after initially being denied passage on the last British ship to leave Saint-Jean-de-Luz because they were reluctant to take a woman on board.

She delivered the papers to de Gaulle and her linguistic skills led to her becoming his driver and interpreter at the headquarters of the Free France government-in-exile in Carlton Gardens in London. She continued in this role until 1943, including during the London Blitz and was in the Café de Paris on 8 March 1941 when it was bombed, resulting in damage to her hearing. She used her father's Wolseley car until an official vehicle was assigned.

== Awards ==
In June 1941 she was presented with the Croix de Guerre for her courage and endurance by General Maxime Weygand. In 1993, she was invited to the inauguration of a statue of Charles de Gaulle in Carlton Gardens. Jordan was one of those included in Army Girls by Tessa Dunlop.
