= Guy Tzarfati =

Israeli footballer and manager

Guy Tzarfati גיא צרפתי
Personal information
- Full name: Guy Tzarfati
- Date of birth: April 28, 1979 (age 47)
- Place of birth: Tel Aviv, Israel
- Height: 5 ft 8 in (1.73 m)
- Position: Attacking midfielder

Team information
- Current team: Hapoel Ramat HaSharon

Youth career
- Maccabi Tel Aviv

Senior career*
Years	Team	Apps	(Gls)
1996–2002	Maccabi Tel Aviv	109	(21)
2002–2004	Maccabi Netanya	79	(17)
2004–2005	Hapoel Tel Aviv	24	(1)
2005–2009	Ironi Kiryat Shmona	115	(10)
2009–2012	Hapoel Petah Tikva	88	(10)
2012–2013	Hapoel Haifa	36	(3)
2013–2014	F.C. Ashdod	19	(1)

International career
1996–1997	Israel U18	7	(4)
1998–2001	Israel U21	15	(3)
2003–2004	Israel	4	(0)

Managerial career
- 2014–2015: F.C. Ashdod (assistant)
- 2015: Maccabi Netanya (assistant)
- 2015–2016: Maccabi Netanya (caretaker)
- 2016: Hapoel Petah Tikva
- 2016–2019: Maccabi Tel Aviv (youth)
- 2019–2020: Hapoel Be'er Sheva (assistant)
- 2020–2023: Maccabi Haifa (assistant)
- 2023: Red Star Belgrade (assistant)
- 2023–2024: Maccabi Netanya
- 2025–: Maccabi Haifa (assistant)
- * Club domestic league appearances and goals

Guy Tzarfati (Hebrew: גיא צרפתי; born 28 April 1979) is a retired Israeli footballer who was works as the assistant manager of Maccabi Haifa.

Guy's father Sami and older brother Jackie were also professional footballers.

== Managerial statistics ==
As of 31 March 2024

Team	Nat	From	To	Record				
Team	Nat	From	To	P	W	D	L	Win %
Maccabi Netanya	(Israel)	2015	2016	2	0	0	2	0.00
Hapoel Petah Tikva	(Israel)	2016	2016	6	0	4	2	0.00
Maccabi Netanya	(Israel)	2023	2024	18	8	1	9	44.44
Total				26	8	5	13	30.77

== Honours ==
- Toto Cup (2):
  - 1998-99, 2012–13
- Israel State Cup (1):
  - 2001
- Liga Leumit (1):
  - 2006-07
