= Tzarfat =

Biblical placename

Tzarfat (Hebrew: צרפת, romanized: Ṣārp̄aṯ, Israeli pronunciation: [tsaʁˈfat]) is a Biblical placename that may refer to Sarepta in Lebanon. From Medieval Hebrew and into Modern Hebrew, it has come to be identified with France. The modern term evolved from the medieval Zarfat, as seen in Joseph ha-Kohen's Dibre ha-Yamim le-Malke Zarfat we-'Otoman (Chronicles of the Kings of France and the Ottoman Empire).

The epithet tzarfati (צרפתי) was frequently applied in rabbinical literature to Jews of French birth or descent and it has become a surname variously spelled as Tzarfati, Sarfati, etc.

== Sources ==
- Falk, A. (1996). A Psychoanalytic History of the Jews. Fairleigh Dickinson University Press. p. 364. ISBN 9780838636602.
- Banitt, M. (1985). Rashi: Interpreter of the Biblical Letter. Chaim Rosenberg School of Jewish Studies, Tel Aviv University.
