= List of paintings of Abraham Lincoln =

Abraham Lincoln was the 16th president of the United States from 1861 to 1865. The oil paintings below depict Abraham Lincoln as their principal subject, ranging from George Peter Alexander Healy's Abraham Lincoln (1860) to George H. Story's Abraham Lincoln (1916).

== Portraits ==
Image	Title	Artist	Date	Location	Ref
	Abraham Lincoln	George Peter Alexander Healy	1860	National Gallery of Art	
	Abraham Lincoln	Anonymous	1864	National Gallery of Art	
	The Penny Image of Abraham Lincoln	William Willard	1864	National Portrait Gallery	
	Portrait of Abraham Lincoln	Joseph Alexander Ames	1864–1865	Unknown	
	Abraham Lincoln	John H. Littlefield	1865	John Hay Library	
	Abraham Lincoln	George Peter Alexander Healy	1869	State Dining Room of the White House	
	Abraham Lincoln	William F. Cogswell	1869	White House Historical Association	
	Abraham Lincoln	Douglas Volk	1908	National Gallery of Art	
	Abraham Lincoln	George H. Story	1916	Smithsonian American Art Museum	

== History paintings ==
Image	Title	Artist	Date	Location	Ref
	The Peacemakers	George Peter Alexander Healy	1868	White House	
	The Last Hours of Abraham Lincoln	Alonzo Chappel	1868	Chicago History Museum	
