= William Willard =

William Willard may refer to:

- William Willard (deaf educator) (1809–1881), founded Indiana's school for the deaf in Indianapolis, Indiana
- William Willard (painter) (1819–1904), American painter
- W. Willard Wirtz (William Willard Wirtz, 1912–2010), U.S. administrator, cabinet

== See also ==
- William Willard Ashe (1872–1932), American forester and botanist
- William Willard Gibson Jr. (1932–2026), American lawyer and educator
- William Wirtz (American football) (William Willard Wirtz Sr., 1887–1965), American football, basketball, and baseball coach
