= Ulysses S. Grant and the American Civil War =

Wartime career of the prominent Union general

Ulysses S. Grant
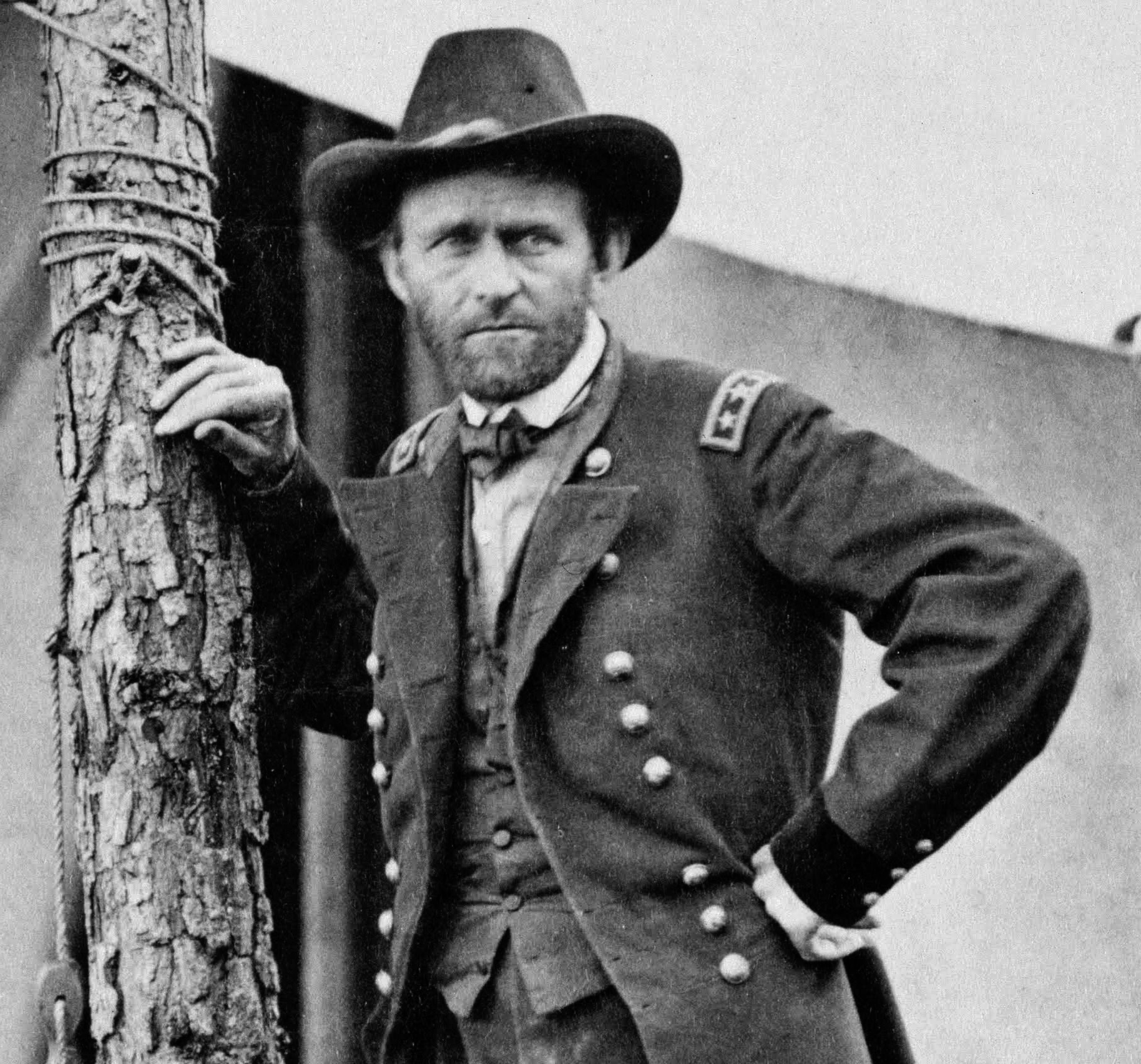
- General Grant in 1864

Commanding General of the United States Army
- In office March 9, 1864 – March 4, 1869

Personal details
- Born: Hiram Ulysses Grant; April 27, 1822 Point Pleasant, Ohio, U.S.
- Died: July 23, 1885 (aged 63) Wilton, New York, U.S.

Military service
- Branch/service: United States Army (Union Army)
- Years of service: 1861–1869
- Rank: General of the Army
- Commands: United States Army; Company F, 4th Infantry; 21st Illinois Infantry Regiment; District of Southeast Missouri; District of Cairo; Army of the Tennessee; Division of the Mississippi
- Battles/wars: See list: American Civil War; Battle of Belmont; Battle of Fort Henry; Battle of Fort Donelson; Battle of Shiloh; Vicksburg campaign; Battle of Champion Hill; Chattanooga campaign; Overland Campaign; Petersburg campaign; Appomattox campaign

On the onset of the American Civil War in April 1861, Ulysses S. Grant was working as a clerk in his father's leather goods store in Galena, Illinois. When the war began, his military experience was needed, and congressman Elihu B. Washburne became his patron in political affairs and promotions in Illinois and nationwide.

Grant trained Union military recruits and was promoted to colonel in June 1861. Major general John C. Frémont, who viewed in Grant an "iron will" to win, appointed Grant to commander of the District of Cairo. Grant became famous around the nation after capturing Fort Donelson in February 1862 and was promoted to major general by president Abraham Lincoln. After a series of decisive yet costly battles and victories at Shiloh, Vicksburg, and Chattanooga, Grant was promoted to lieutenant general by Lincoln in 1864 and given charge of all the Union armies. Grant went on to defeat Robert E. Lee after another series of costly battles in the Overland Campaign, the Siege of Petersburg, and the Appomattox campaign. After the Civil War, Grant was given his final promotion of general of the Armed Forces in 1866 and served until 1869. His popularity as a Union war general enabled him to be elected president in 1868.

Grant was the most acclaimed Union general during the Civil War. Some historians have viewed him as a "butcher" commander who in 1864 used attrition without regard to the lives of his own soldiers in order to kill off the enemy which could no longer replenish its losses. Throughout the Civil War, Grant's armies incurred approximately 154,000 casualties, while having inflicted 191,000 casualties on his opposing Confederate armies. In terms of success, Grant was the only general during the Civil War who received the surrender of three Confederate armies. Although Grant maintained high casualties during the Overland Campaign in 1864, his aggressive fighting strategy was in compliance with the U.S. government's strategic war aims and was in any case abetted by profligate Confederate generals who were willing to match his losses. Grant has recently been praised by historians for his "military genius" and viewed as a decisive general who emphasized movement and logistics. Grant is considered a modern, natural, and skillful general, leading from a central command center, using common sense, and delivering coordinated attacks on the enemy's armies.

== Background ==
Ulysses S. Grant began his military career as a cadet at the United States Military Academy at West Point in 1839. After graduation, he went on to serve with distinction as a lieutenant in the Mexican–American War. Grant was a keen observer of the war and learned battle strategies serving under generals Zachary Taylor and Winfield Scott. After the war, Grant served at various posts especially in the Pacific Northwest, but he was forced to retire from the service in 1854 due to accusations of drunkenness. He was unable to make a success of farming.

== American Civil War ==
=== Initial commissions ===
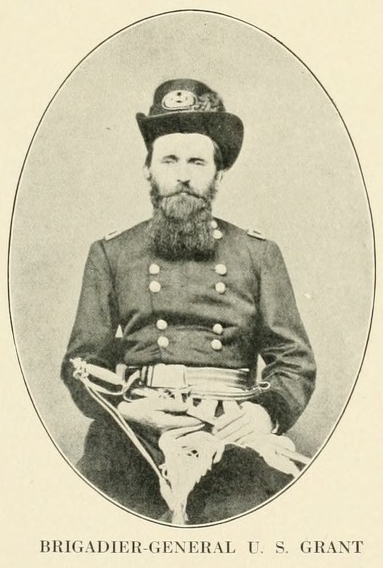
Brigadier General Grant in 1861

On April 15, 1861, after the Confederate attack on Fort Sumter in Charleston, South Carolina, President Abraham Lincoln called for 75,000 volunteers to put down secession. Galena was enthusiastic in support of the war and recognized in Grant the one local with broad military experience. Grant helped recruit a company of volunteers in Galena and accompanied it to Springfield, the state capital, where untrained units were assembling in great confusion. Sponsored by his influential Congressman Elihu B. Washburne, Grant was named by the governor, Richard Yates, to train volunteers. He proved efficient and energetic in the training camps but desired a field command. Yates appointed him as a colonel in the Illinois militia and gave him command of the undisciplined and rebellious 21st Illinois Infantry on June 17. He went to Mexico, Missouri, guarding the Hannibal and St. Joseph Railroad from Confederate attack. On July 31, 1861, President Lincoln appointed him as a brigadier general in the United States Volunteers. On September 1, he was selected by Western Department Commander, Maj. Gen. John C. Frémont, to command the District of Southeast Missouri. He soon established his headquarters at Cairo, Illinois, where the Ohio River joins the Mississippi. His command was soon reorganized and renamed the District of Cairo.

=== Battles of Belmont, Fort Henry, and Fort Donelson ===
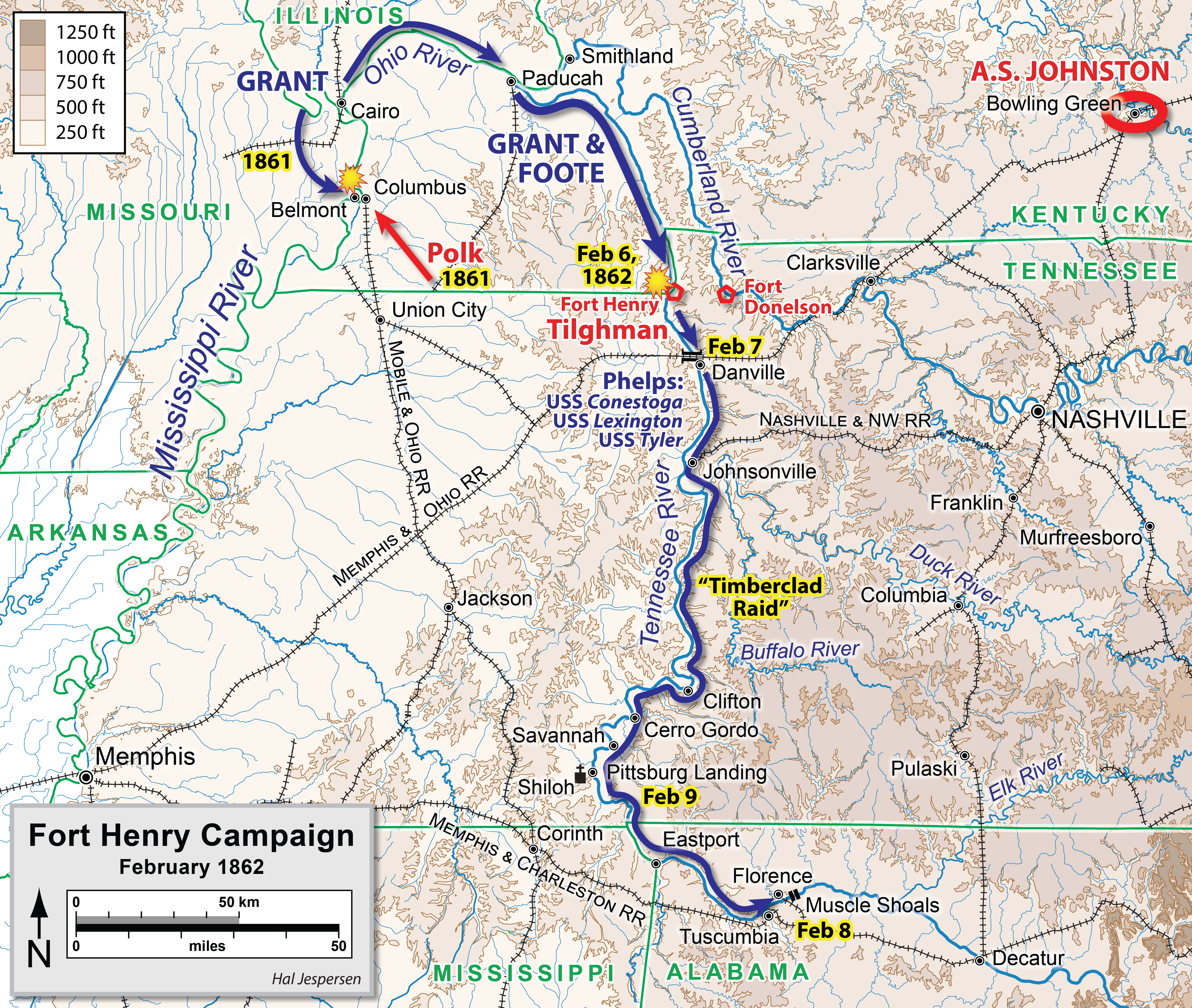
Campaigns for Belmont, Fort Henry, and Fort Donelson

Grant's first Civil War battles occurred while he was in command of the District of Cairo. The Confederate Army, stationed in Columbus under General Leonidas Polk, had violated Kentucky's military neutrality. Immediately, Grant took the initiative and seized Paducah, Kentucky, on September 5, 1861. He was ordered by commanding Union Maj. Gen. John C. Frémont just to make demonstrations against the Confederate Army, rather than attack Polk directly. Grant obeyed the order until President Lincoln discharged Frémont from active duty on November 2, 1861. Going on the offensive, Grant took 3,000 Union troops by boat and attacked the Confederate Army commanded by General Gideon J. Pillow positioned at Camp Johnson in Belmont, Missouri, on November 7, 1861. Having initially pushed back the Confederate forces from Camp Johnson, Grant's undisciplined volunteers wildly celebrated rather than continuing the fight. Pillow, who was given reinforcements by Polk from Columbus, forced the Union troops to make a hasty retreat.

Although the battle was considered inconclusive and futile, Grant and his troops gained the confidence needed to continue on the offensive. More importantly, President Lincoln took notice of Grant's willingness to fight. Grant won approval from Maj. Gen. Henry W. Halleck to attack Confederate Fort Henry on the Tennessee River. Embarking on Admiral Andrew H. Foote's naval flotilla, the expedition steamed south on February 3, 1862, with two divisions of 15,000 men. During the winter, the river had risen and swamped some of the defenses of Fort Henry. On February 6, 1862, Adm. Foote's Union fleet consisting of ironclads and wooden ships bombarded Fort Henry as Grant's troops began the landing. Before Grant could attack, the fortress surrendered. Two Union naval officers entered the fort on a rowboat to accept the surrender. Although approximately 3,000 Confederates escaped east before the surrender, the fall of Fort Henry opened up the Union war effort in Tennessee and Alabama.

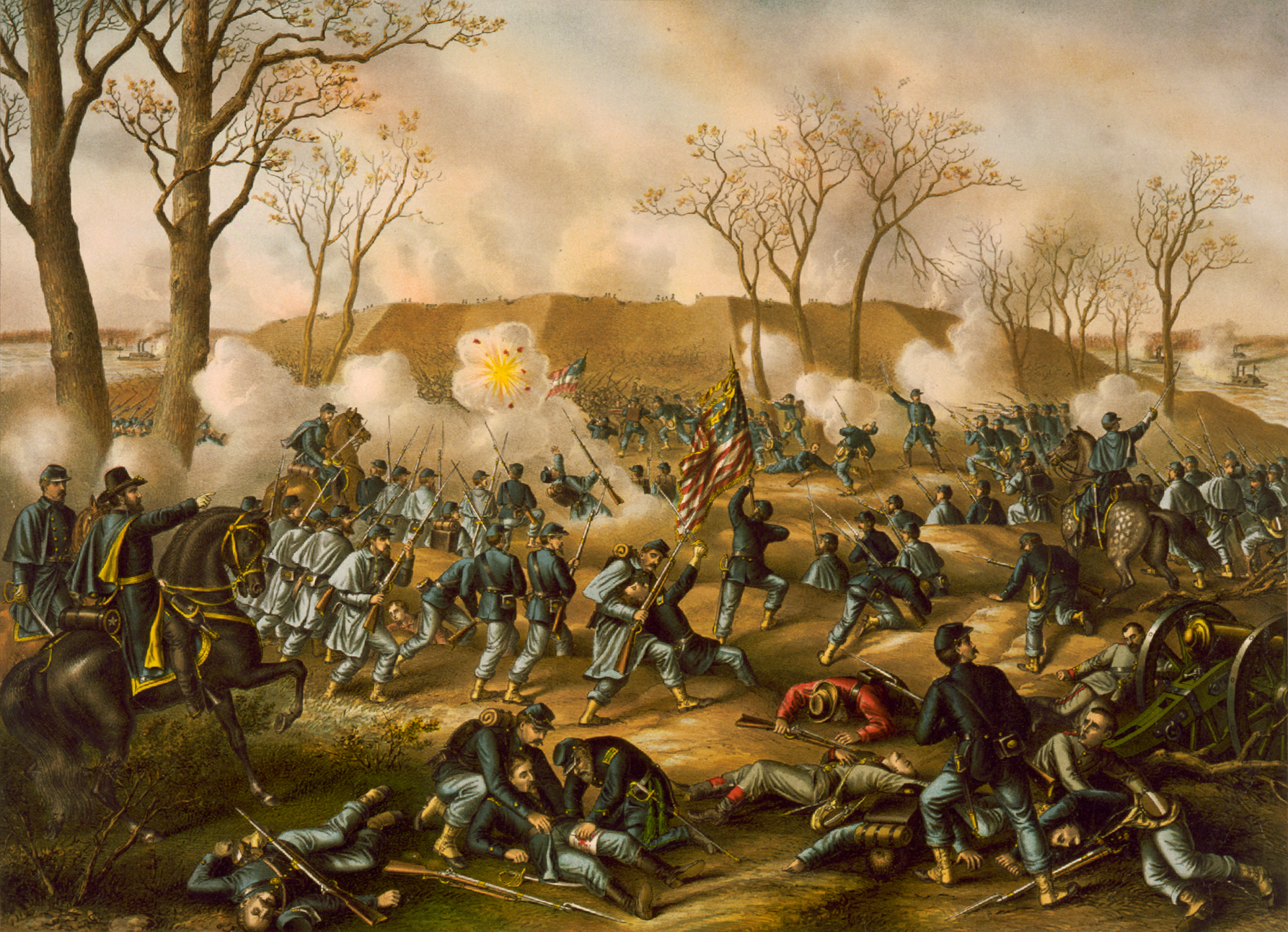
Grant became a national hero to the Union public after his victory at Fort Donelson.

After the fall of Fort Henry, Grant moved his army overland 12 miles east to capture Fort Donelson on the Cumberland River. Foote's naval fleet arrived on February 14 and immediately started a series of bombardments; however, Fort Donelson's water batteries effectively repulsed the naval fleet. Stealthily, on February 15, Confederate Brig. Gen. John B. Floyd ordered General Pillow to strike at Grant's Union forces encamped around the fort, in order to establish an escape route through to Nashville, Tennessee. Pillow's attack pushed McClernand's corps into a disorganized retreat eastward on the Nashville road. However, the Confederate advance stalled, and Grant was able to rally the Union troops to keep the southerners from escaping. The Confederate forces, under General Simon Bolivar Buckner, finally surrendered Fort Donelson on February 16. Grant's surrender demand to Buckner was popular throughout the Union, " "No terms except an unconditional and immediate surrender can be accepted." The general was colloquially known from then on as "Unconditional Surrender" Grant. President Abraham Lincoln promoted Grant to major general of volunteers.

The surrender of Fort Donelson was a tremendous victory for the Union war effort; 12,000 Confederate soldiers had been captured in addition to the bountiful arms inventory of the fort. However, Grant now experienced serious difficulties with his superior in St. Louis, Maj. Gen. Henry W. Halleck. Some writers believe that Halleck was personally or professionally jealous of Grant. In any event, Halleck made various criticisms about Grant to Washington, even suggesting that Grant's performance was impaired by drinking. With Washington's support, Halleck told Grant to remain at Fort Henry and give command of the next expedition up the Tennessee River to Charles F. Smith, newly nominated as a major general. Grant asked three times to be relieved from duty under Halleck. However, Halleck soon restored Grant to field command, perhaps in part because Lincoln intervened to inquire into Halleck's dissatisfaction with Grant. Grant soon rejoined his forces, eventually known as the Army of the Tennessee, at Savannah, Tennessee. After the fall of Donelson, Grant became popularly known for smoking cigars, as many as 18–20 a day.

=== Battle of Shiloh ===
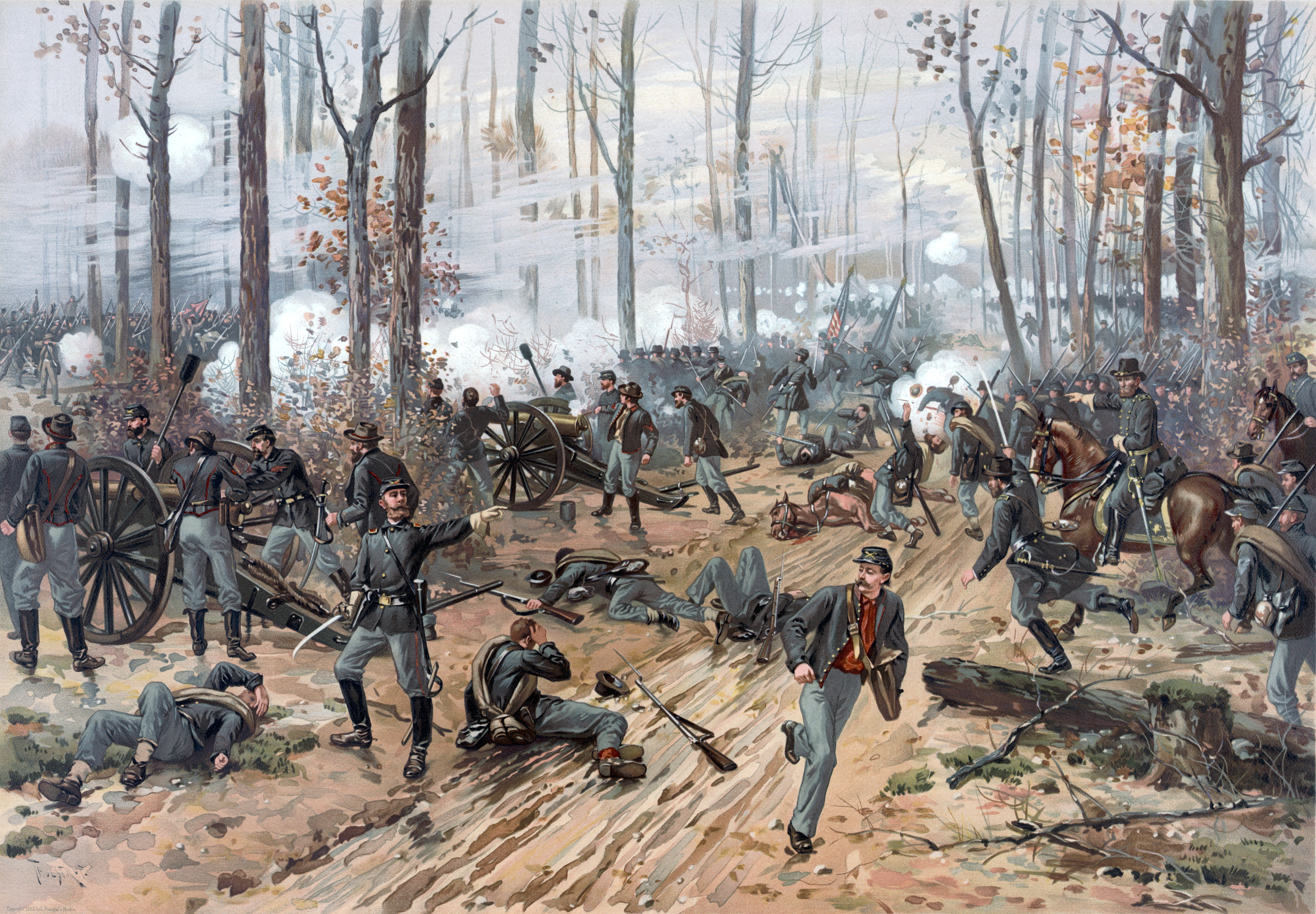
After the carnage at Shiloh, the Civil War became a fight to the bitter end.

In early March 1862, Maj. Gen. Henry W. Halleck ordered Grant's Army of the Tennessee to move southward up the Tennessee River to attack Confederate railroads. Halleck then ordered Maj. Gen. Don Carlos Buell's Army of Ohio to concentrate with Grant before implementing a planned attack on Confederate troops concentrated in Corinth, Mississippi. Buell, whose veteran army was only 90 miles east in Columbia, was hesitant in sending reinforcements, claiming "swollen rivers" were hindering progress. Union commanders Grant and then Brig. Gen. William T. Sherman, the informal commander at Pittsburg Landing, mistakenly assumed Confederate troops would not attack the Union Army, so there were no entrenchments. On April 6, 1862, the Confederates launched a preemptive full force attack on Grant's troops in the Battle of Shiloh; the objective was to destroy Grant's forces before being reinforced by Buell's army. Over 44,000 Confederate Army of Mississippi troops, led by Albert Sidney Johnston and P.G.T. Beauregard, vigorously attacked five divisions of Grant's army bivouacked nine miles north from Savannah, Tennessee, at Pittsburg Landing. Union Col. Everett Peabody, upon his infantry discovering the oncoming Confederate assault, was able to adequately warn the Union Army to form battle lines. Nonetheless, the Confederates were initially able to drive back the Union Army.

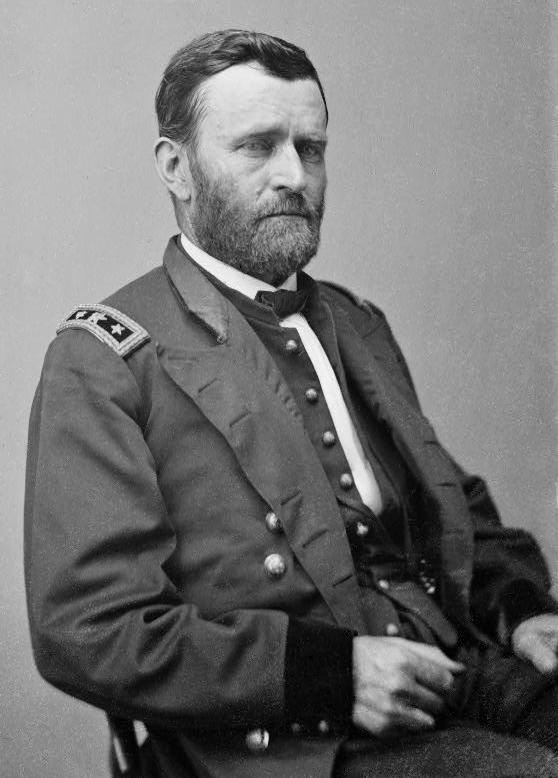
General Grant in 1862

The Union soldiers left, however, under Brig. Gens. Benjamin Prentiss, W.H.L. Wallace, and James M. Tuttle, bravely withstood determined Confederate assaults in a road pocket known as the "Hornet's Nest" for seven hours before being forced to yield ground towards the Tennessee River. This gave the Union army much needed time to be able to stabilize their line formations and gather reinforcements. Prentiss, himself, was taken prisoner and forced to surrender his division to the Confederates, while Wallace was mortally wounded. Grant, nursing a previous horse fall injury, arrived from Savannah where both he and Sherman rallied the troops and staved off defeat. Although Grant's forces were battered, the Army of the Tennessee held strong compact positions with 50 artillery guns while two federal gunboats fired at the Confederates. After receiving reinforcements from Buell and his own army, Grant had a total of 45,000 troops and launched a counter offensive on April 7. Confederate General Johnston was killed in the battle on the first day of fighting, and the Confederate Army, now under Beauregard, was outnumbered and forced to retreat to Corinth, Mississippi.

The 23,746 casualties at Shiloh shocked both the Union and Confederacy, whose combined totals exceeded casualties from all of the United States' previous wars. The Battle of Shiloh led to much criticism of Grant for leaving his army unprepared defensively; he was also falsely accused of being drunk. According to one account, President Lincoln rejected suggestions to dismiss Grant, saying, "I can't spare this man; he fights." After Shiloh, General Halleck took the field personally and gathered a 120,000-man army at Pittsburg Landing, including Grant's Army of the Tennessee, Buell's Army of the Ohio, and John Pope's Army of the Mississippi. Halleck assigned Grant the role of second-in-command, with others in direct command of his divisions. Grant was upset over the situation and might have left his command, but his friend and fellow officer, William T. Sherman, persuaded him to stay in Halleck's Army. After capturing Corinth, Mississippi, the 120,000-man army was disbanded; Halleck was promoted to General in Chief of the Union Army and transferred east to Washington, D.C. Grant resumed immediate command of the Army of the Tennessee and, a year later, captured the Confederate stronghold of Vicksburg.

=== Refugees from Slavery ===
On July 2, 1862, President Lincoln had authorized African American contrabands or "fugitive slaves" seeking refuge in the Union Army to be recruited. During the fall of 1862, Grant made efforts to take care of "wagon loads" of black slave refugees in Western Tennessee and Northern Mississippi. On November 13, 1862, Grant placed Chaplain John Eaton of the 27th Ohio Infantry in charge of the refugees. Eaton organized camps and put the refugees to work to bring in the fall corn and cotton crops on deserted plantations. Eaton proved to be a judicious and fair leader of the refugees, protecting them from Confederate marauders. The refugees were not paid directly at this time; however, money was allocated and spent on them reasonably for their benefit. Eventually, these African Americans were recruited into the Union Army and paid directly to cut wood to fuel the Union steamers. With the resulting income the refugees were able to feed and clothe their families. This would be the beginnings of what would be known as the Freedmens Bureau during Reconstruction. Similar efforts to incorporate African Americans into the Union war effort were made on the Atlantic coast. A number of Union political conservatives in Illinois, however, were against and blocked the influx of African Americans into their state. On January 1, 1863, President Lincoln issued the Emancipation Proclamation, freeing the slaves in the states and parts of states in rebellion. Thereafter, the Union recruited both former slaves and other blacks to fight against the Confederacy in new regiments of the Union Army known as the United States Colored Troops.

=== The Battle of Vicksburg ===
Resolved to take control of the Mississippi River from the Confederacy, President Lincoln and the Union Army and Navy were determined to take the Confederate stronghold Vicksburg in 1862. Lincoln authorized Maj. Gen. John A. McClernand, a war Democrat politician, to recruit troops, the XIII corps, and organize an expedition against Vicksburg. A personal rivalry developed between Grant and McClernand on who would get credit for taking Vicksburg. The Vicksburg campaign started in December 1862 and lasted six months before the Union Army finally took the fortress. The campaign combined multiple important naval operations, troop maneuvers, failed initiatives, and was divided into two stages. The prize of capturing Vicksburg would ensure either McClernand or Grant's success and would divide the Confederacy into an eastern and western part. At the opening of the campaign, Grant attempted to capture Vicksburg overland from the Northeast; however, Confederate Generals Nathan B. Forrest and Earl Van Dorn thwarted the Union Army advance by raiding Union supply lines. A related direct assault riverine expedition then failed when Maj. Gen. William T. Sherman was repulsed by the Confederate forces at the Battle of Chickasaw Bayou.

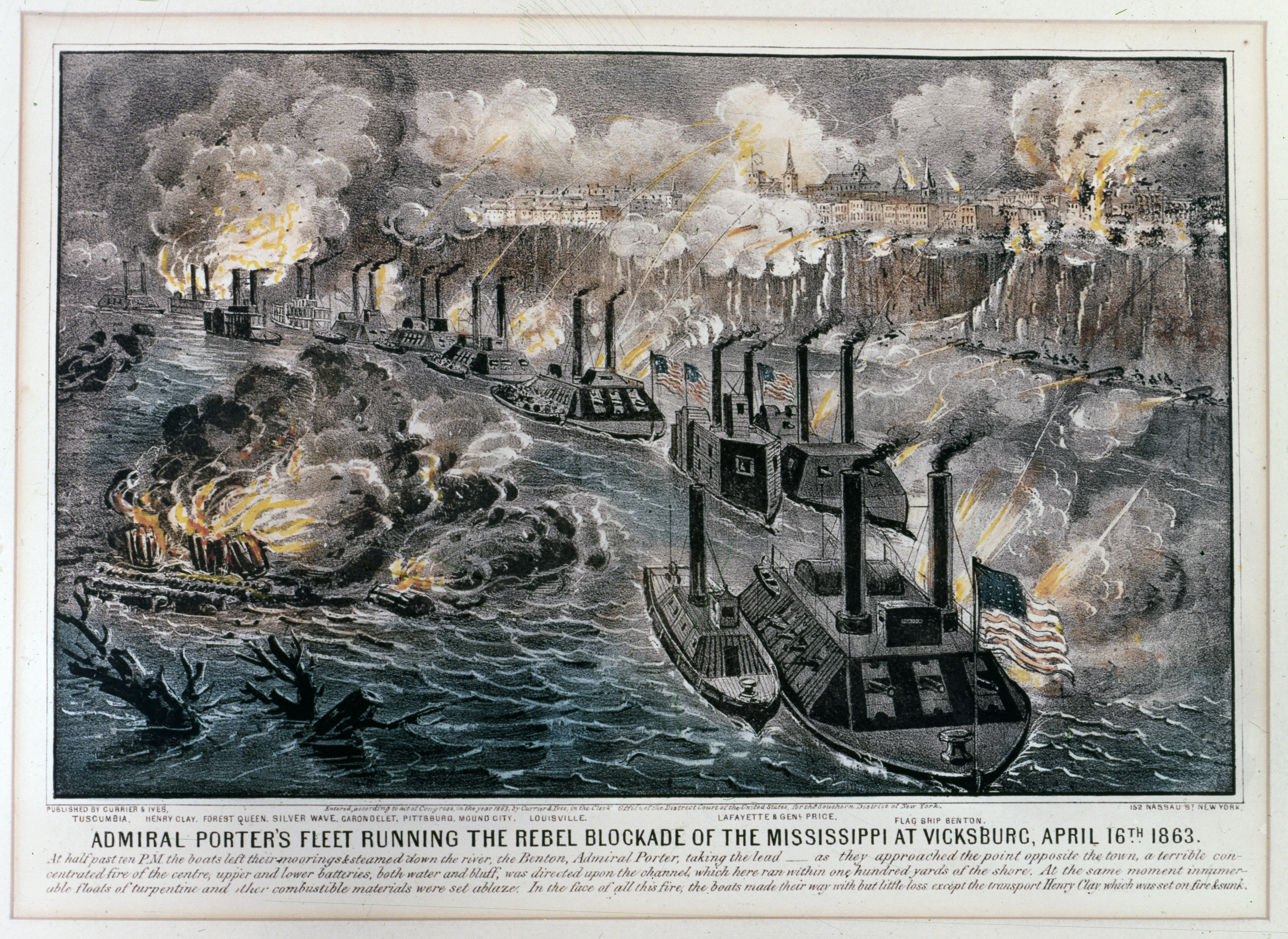
Grant's bold gamble: the Union fleet running the Confederate Vicksburg fortress guns.

In January 1863, McClernand and Sherman's combined XIII and XV corps, the Army of the Mississippi, defeated the Confederates at Arkansas Post. Grant made five attempts to capture Vicksburg by water routes; however, all failed. With the Union impatient for a victory, in March 1863, the second stage to capture Vicksburg began. Grant marched his troops down the west side of the Mississippi River and crossed over at Bruinsburg. Adm. David D. Porter's navy ships had previously made a run past Vicksburg's batteries on April 16, 1863, enabling Union troops to be transported to the east side of the river. The crossing succeeded due to Grant's elaborate series of demonstrations and diversions that masked his intended movements from the Confederates. After the crossing, Grant maneuvered his army inland, and after a series of battles, the state capital, Jackson, Mississippi, was captured. Confederate general John C. Pemberton was defeated by Grant's forces at the battles of Champion Hill and of Black River Bridge and retreated to the Vicksburg fortress. After two unsuccessful and costly assaults on Vicksburg, Grant settled in for a 40-day siege. Pemberton, unable to combine forces with the army of Joseph E. Johnston, which was hovering in central Mississippi, finally surrendered Vicksburg on July 4, 1863. The capture of Vicksburg was a turning point for the Union war effort. The surrender of Vicksburg and the defeat of Confederate general Robert E. Lee at Gettysburg were stinging defeats for the Confederacy, now split in two by the Union's domination of the Mississippi River. President Lincoln promoted Grant to the permanent rank of major general in the Regular Army. Vicksburg marked the second surrender of a Confederate army (the other being Buckner's surrender to Grant the year before). During the Vicksburg siege, Grant dismissed McClernand for publishing to the press a congratulatory order that seemed to claim it was McClernand's corps that was winning the campaign. McClernand appealed the dismissal to his personal friend, President Lincoln, but to no avail. Grant had ended the rivalry on his own terms. The Union army had captured considerable Confederate artillery, small arms, and ammunition. Total casualties, killed or wounded, for the final operation against Vicksburg that started on March 29, 1863, were 10,142 for the Union and 9,091 for the Confederacy.

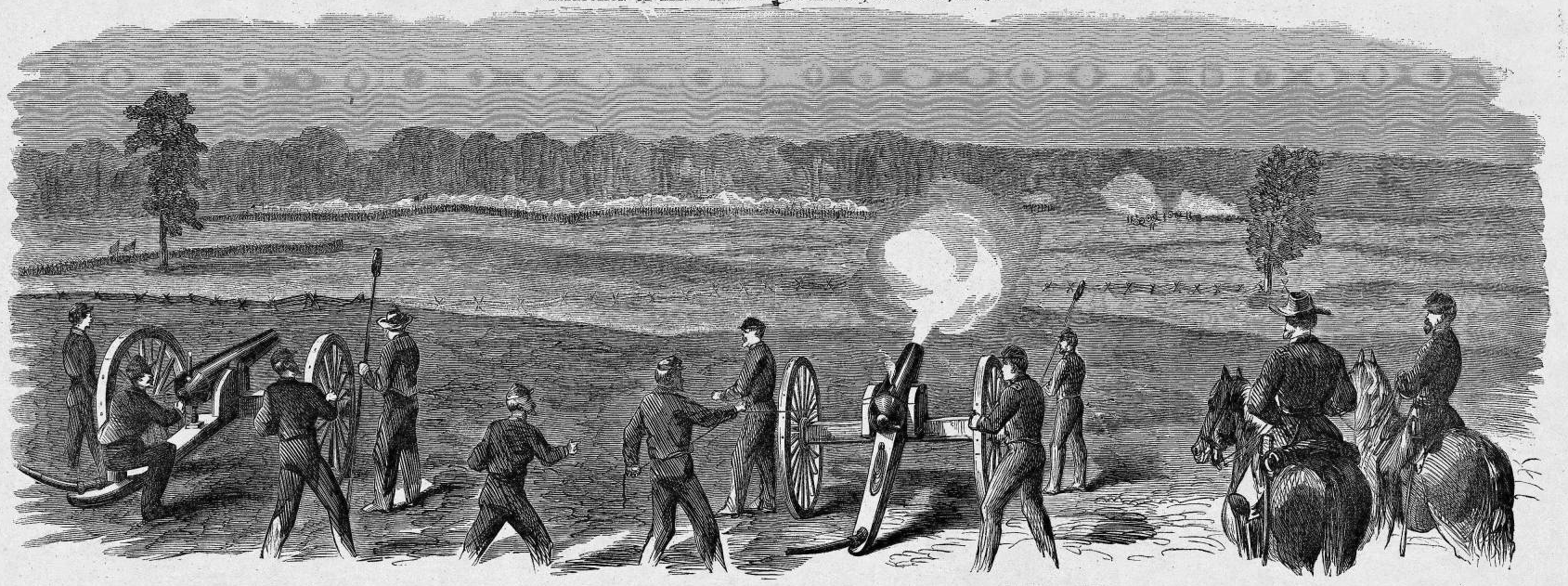
Grant's victory at Champion Hill forced Pemberton into a 40-day siege at Vicksburg.

Although the victory at Vicksburg was a tremendous advance in the Union War effort, Grant's reputation did not escape criticism. During the initial campaign in December 1862, Grant became upset and angry over speculators and traders who inundated his department and violated rules about trading cotton in a militarized zone. As a result, Grant issued his notorious General Order No. 11 on December 17, expelling all Jews who he believed were engaged in trade in his department, including their families. When protests erupted from Jews and non-Jews alike, President Lincoln rescinded the order on January 4, 1863; however, the episode tarnished Grant's reputation. In addition, Grant was accused by Maj. Gen. Charles S. Hamilton and William J. Kountz for being a "drunkard" and "gloriously drunk" in February and March, 1863. Maj. Gen. John A. McClernand was alleged to have promoted and secretly spread this rumor in the Union Army. Both McClernand and Hamilton were seeking promotion in the army at the time of these allegations. Cincinnati Commercial editor Murat Halstead railed that, "Our whole Army of the Mississippi is being wasted by a foolish, drunken, stupid Grant". Lincoln sent Charles A. Dana to keep a watchful eye. To save Grant from dismissal, assistant Adjutant General John A. Rawlins, Grant's friend, got him to take a pledge not to touch alcohol.

=== General Order No. 11 ===
During the Vicksburg campaign Grant had received numerous reports from General Sherman and others that "highly visible" Jewish merchants were trading gold for cotton and were routinely violating trade regulations in Grant's war district. When his own father, Jesse Grant, arrived at his headquarters with two prominent Jewish merchants requesting special permits to trade in cotton Grant became angry and ordered his father and his partners to leave on the next train going north. Believing Jewish merchants had used his father and were also playing a large role in the widespread cotton speculation, he issued General Order No. 11 from his Headquarters in Holly Springs, Mississippi, on December 17, 1862. Because of the generalized wording of the order allegations of antisemitism were soon levied at Grant. The Order stated in part:

The Jews, as a class, violating every regulation of trade established by the Treasury Department, and also Department orders, are hereby expelled from the Department (comprising areas of Tennessee, Mississippi, and Kentucky).

The New York Times denounced the order as "humiliating" and a "revival of the spirit of the medieval ages." Its editorial column called for the "utter reprobation" of Grant's order. After protest from Jewish leaders, the order was rescinded by President Lincoln on January 3, 1863. Though Grant initially maintained that a staff officer issued it in his name, it was suggested by Gen. James H. Wilson that Grant may have issued the order in order to strike indirectly at the "lot of relatives who were always trying to use him" (for example his father, Jesse Grant, who was in business with Jewish traders), and perhaps struck instead at what he maliciously saw as their counterpart — opportunistic traders who were Jewish. Bertram Korn suggests the order was part of a consistent pattern. "This was not the first discriminatory order [Grant] had signed [...] he was firmly convinced of the Jews' guilt and was eager to use any means of ridding himself of them." During the campaign of 1868, Grant admitted the order was his, but maintained, "It would never have been issued if it had not been telegraphed the moment it were penned, and without reflection." The order, ostensibly in response to illegal cotton smuggling done without Treasury approval, has been described by one modern historian as "the most blatant official episode of anti-Semitism in nineteenth-century American history."

=== Chattanooga ===
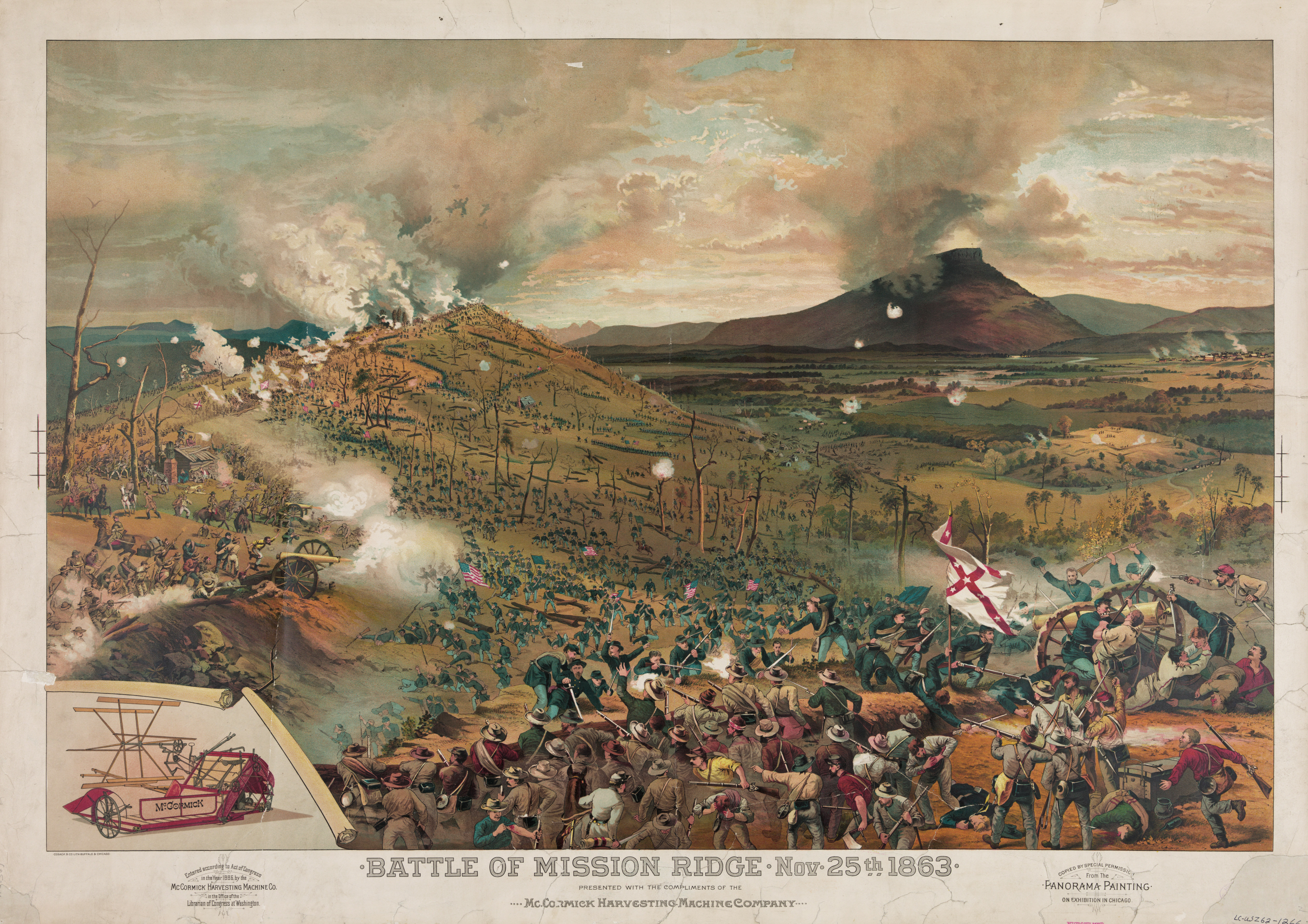
Union troops swarm Missionary Ridge and defeat Bragg's army.

When Maj. Gen. William S. Rosecrans was defeated at Chickamauga in September 1863, the Confederates, led by Braxton Bragg, besieged the Union Army of the Cumberland in Chattanooga. In response, President Lincoln put Grant in charge of the new Military Division of the Mississippi to break the siege at Chattanooga, making Grant the commander of all Western Armies. Grant, who immediately relieved Rosecrans from duty, personally went to Chattanooga to take control of the situation, taking 20,000 troops commanded by Maj. Gen. William T. Sherman from the Army of the Tennessee. Maj. Gen. Joseph Hooker was ordered to Chattanooga, taking 15,000 troops from the Army of the Potomac. Rations were running severely low for the Cumberland army and supply relief was necessary for a Union counter offensive. When Grant arrived at Chattanooga at the Union camp, he was informed of their plight and implemented a system known as the "Cracker Line," devised by Maj. Gen. George H. Thomas's chief engineer, William F. "Baldy" Smith. After Union army seized Brown's Ferry, Hooker's troops and supplies were sent into the city, helping to feed the starving men and animals and to prepare for an assault on the Confederate forces surrounding the city.

Battles for Chattanooga, November 23–25, 1863

On November 23, Grant launched his offensive on Missionary Ridge, combining the forces of the Army of the Cumberland, the Army of the Tennessee, and the Army of the Potomac. Maj. Gen. Thomas took a minor high ground known as Orchard Knob while Maj. Gen. Sherman took strategic positions for an attack on Bragg's right flank on Missionary Ridge. On November 24, in heavy fog, Hooker captured Lookout Mountain and positioned his troops to attack Bragg's left flank at Rossville. On November 25, Grant ordered Thomas's Army of the Cumberland to make a diversionary attack only to take the "rifle pits" on Missionary Ridge. However, after the soldiers took the rifle pits, they proceeded on their own initiative without orders to make a successful frontal assault straight up Missionary Ridge. Bragg's army, routed and defeated, was in complete disarray from the frontal assault and forced to retreat to South Chickamauga Creek. Although the valiant frontal assault was successful, Grant was initially upset because he did not give direct orders for the men to take Missionary Ridge; however, he was satisfied with their results. The victory at Missionary Ridge eliminated the last Confederate control of Tennessee and opened the door to an invasion of the Deep South, leading to Sherman's Atlanta campaign of 1864. Casualties after the battle were 5,824 for the Union and 6,667 for Confederate armies, respectively.

=== Promotion to general-in-chief ===
After the Confederate defeat at Chattanooga, President Lincoln promoted Grant to a special regular army rank, General-in-chief (Lieutenant General), authorized by Congress on March 2, 1864. This rank had previously been awarded two other times, a full rank to George Washington and a Brevet rank to Winfield Scott. President Lincoln was reluctant to award the promotion, until informed that Grant was not seeking to be a candidate in the Presidential Election of 1864. With the new rank, Grant moved his headquarters to the east and installed Maj. Gen. Sherman as commander of the Western Armies. President Lincoln and Grant met together in Washington and devised "total war" plans that struck at the heart of the Confederacy, including military, railroad, and economic infrastructures.

No longer refugees, African Americans were now incorporated into the Union Army as trained soldiers, taking away the Confederacy's labor force. The two primary objectives in the plans were to defeat Robert E. Lee's Army of Virginia and Joseph E. Johnston's Army of Tennessee. They would attack the Confederacy from multiple directions: the Union Army of the Potomac, led by George G. Meade, would attack Lee's Army of Northern Virginia; Benjamin Butler would attack south of Richmond from the James River; Sherman would attack Johnson's army in Georgia; and George Crook and William W. Averell would destroy railroad supply lines in West Virginia. Nathaniel P. Banks was to capture Mobile, Alabama. Franz Sigel was to guard the Baltimore and Ohio railroad and advance in the Shenandoah Valley. Grant would command all the Union army forces while in the field with Meade and the Army of the Potomac.

=== Fort Pillow Massacre ===
On April 12, 1864, Confederate forces under Maj. Gen. Nathan B. Forrest captured Union Fort Pillow and slaughtered Union African American troops rather than keep them as prisoners. Union Lt. Gen. Grant retaliated by ordering Union prisoner exchanges canceled until Union black soldiers were treated equally with white soldiers. The Confederate government declined to do so.

=== Overland Campaign ===
Movements and battles of Grant's Overland Campaign

On May 4, 1864, Grant began a series of battles with Robert E. Lee and the Army of Northern Virginia known as the Overland Campaign. The first battle between Lee and Grant took place after the Army of the Potomac crossed Rapidan River into an area of secondary growth trees and shrubs known as the Wilderness. Lee was able to use this protective undergrowth to counter Grant's superior troop strength. Union Maj. Gen. Winfield S. Hancock's II corps was able to inflict heavy casualties and drive back the Confederate General A.P. Hill's corps two miles; however, Lee was able to drive back the Union advance with Confederate General James Longstreet's reserves. The difficult, bloody, and costly battles lasted two days, May 5 and 6, resulting in an advantage to neither side. Unlike Union generals who retreated after similar battles with Lee, Grant ignored any setbacks and continued to flank Lee's right moving southward. The tremendous casualties for the Battle of the Wilderness were 17,666 for the Union and 11,125 for the Confederate armies, respectively.

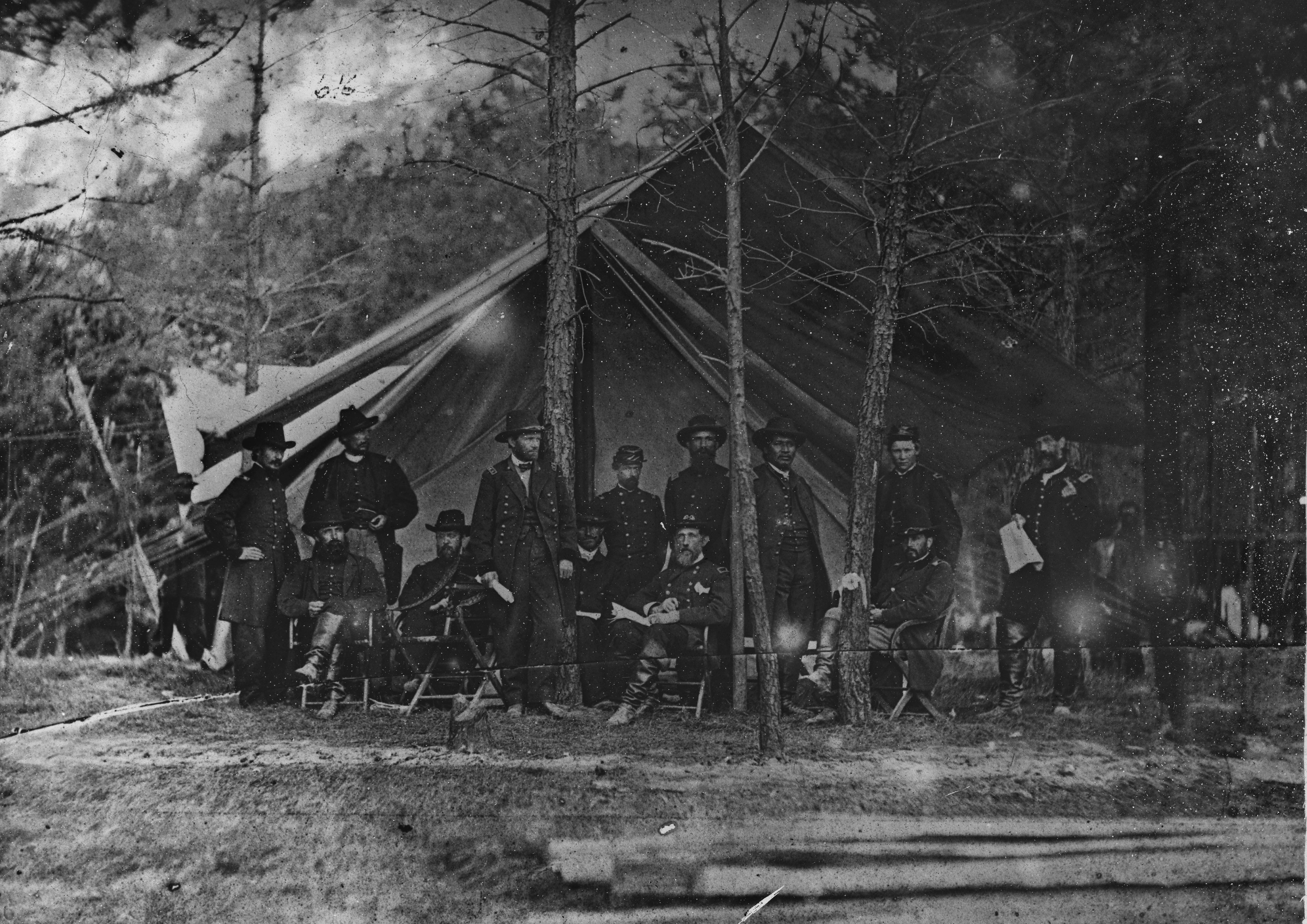
General Grant (at center, standing with shoulder resting on tree) and members of his staff, at Cold Harbor, Virginia, 1864

Although the Wilderness battle was costly for the Union, Grant decided to move south and continue the fight with Lee. As the Army of the Potomac moved southward from the Wilderness, Grant, on May 8, was forced into yet an even more desperate 14-day battle at Spotsylvania. Anticipating Grant's right flank move, Lee was able to position his army at Spotsylvania Court House before Grant and his army could arrive. The battle started on May 10. Although Lee's Army of Northern Virginia was located in an exposed rough arc known as the "Mule Shoe," his army resisted multiple assaults from Grant's Army of the Potomac for the first six days of the battle. The fiercest fighting in the battle took place on a point known as "Bloody angle". Rifles refused to fire due to the troops gunpowder getting wet from rainy weather and they were forced into a bloody hand-to-hand struggle similar to battles fought in ancient times. Both Confederates and Union soldiers were slaughtered and men were piled on top of each other in their attempt to control the point. By May 21, the fighting had finally stopped; Grant had lost 18,000 men with 3,000 having been killed in the prolonged battle. Many talented Confederate officers were killed in the battle with Lee's Army significantly damaged having a total of 10–13,000 casualties. The popular Union Maj. Gen. John Sedgwick of the VI corps was killed in the battle by a sharpshooter and replaced by Maj. Gen. Horatio G. Wright. During the fighting at Spotsylvania, Grant stated, "I will fight it on this line if it takes all summer."

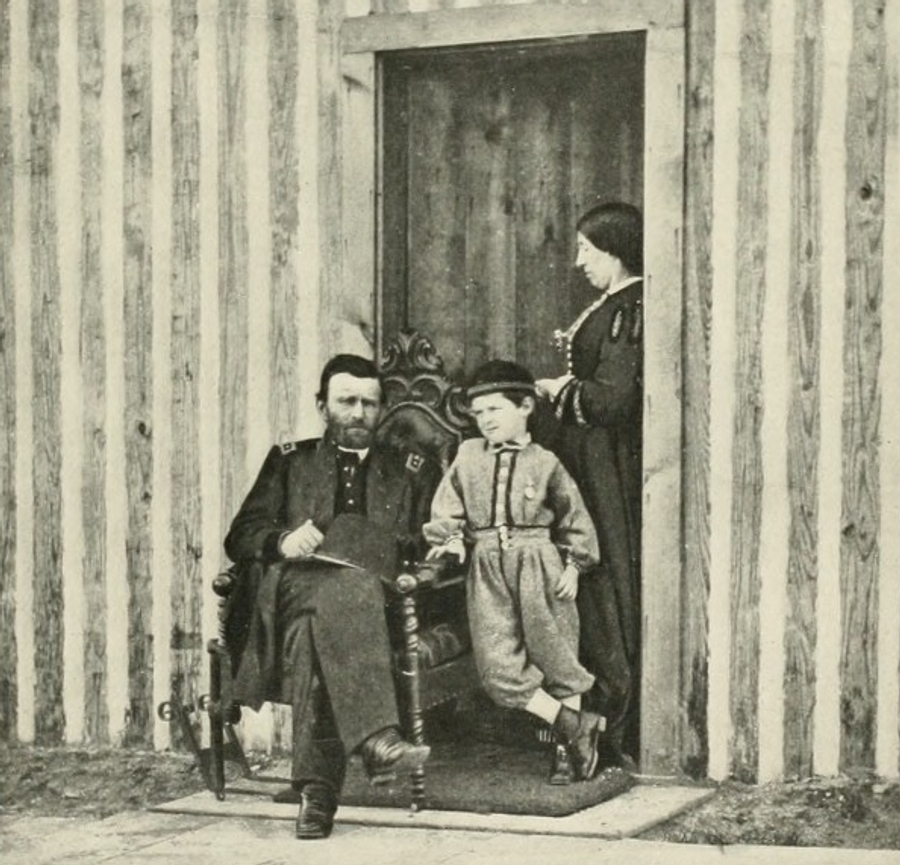
General Grant with his wife Julia and son Jesse at City Point in 1864

Finding he could not break Lee's line of defense at Spotsylvania, Grant turned southward and moved to the North Anna River a dozen miles closer to Richmond. An attempt was made by Grant to get Lee to fight out in the open by sending an individual II Corps on the west bank of the Mattaponi River. Rather than take the bait, Lee anticipated a second right flank movement by Grant and retreated to the North Anna River in response to the Union V and VI corps, withdrawing from Spotsylvania. During this time, a number of Confederate generals, including Lee, were incapacitated due to illness or injury. Lee, stricken with dysentery, was unable to take advantage of an opportunity to seize parts of the Army of the Potomac. After a series of inconclusive minor battles at North Anna on May 23 and 24, the Army of the Potomac withdrew 20 miles southeast to important crossroads at Cold Harbor. From June 1 to 3, Grant and Lee fought each other at Cold Harbor with the heaviest Union casualties on the final day. Grant's ordered assault on June 3 was disastrous and lopsided with 6,000 Union casualties to Lee's 1,500. After twelve days of fighting at Cold Harbor, total casualties were 12,000 for the Union and 2,500 for the Confederacy. On June 11, 1864, Grant's Army of the Potomac broke away completely from Robert E. Lee, and on June 12 secretly crossed the James River on a pontoon bridge and attacked the railroad junction at Petersburg. For a brief time, Robert E. Lee had no idea where the Army of the Potomac was.

=== Union opinion ===
Among northern antiwar elements after the stalemate at Cold Harbor, Grant was castigated as the "Butcher" for having sustained high casualties without a decisive victory over Robert E. Lee. However, Grant was able to successfully eliminate Lee's offensive capacity after the Overland Campaign and pinned him in the trenches of Petersburg. Grant, himself, who regretted the assault on June 3 at Cold Harbor as a bad mistake on his part, was determined to keep casualties minimal thereafter. Grant's plan was to keep fighting and Lincoln supported him, as did the Republican party apparatus, speakers and newspapers across the North.

Without a Union military victory, President Lincoln's presidential campaign of 1864 against former general and Democratic contender George McClellan might have been at risk. Maj. Gen. Sherman was bogged down chasing Confederate general Joseph E. Johnston into a conclusive battle. Benjamin Butler, who was supposed to attack Confederate railroads south of Richmond, was trapped in the Bermuda Hundred. Sigel had failed to secure the Shenandoah Valley from Confederate invasion and was relieved from duty.

The entire Union war effort seemed to be stalling and the Union public was growing increasingly impatient. The Copperheads, an anti-war movement of northern Democrats, advocated legal recognition of the Confederacy, immediate peace talks, and encouraged draft dodging and desertion. The Union war effort was at its weakest point in the summer of 1864 while leaving the Washington capitol exposed to Confederate attack.

=== Petersburg and Appomattox ===
Petersburg was the supply center for Northern Virginia with five railroads meeting at one junction. Its capture meant the immediate downfall of Richmond. To protect Richmond and fight Grant at the battles of the Wilderness, Spotsylvania, and Cold Harbor, Lee was forced to leave Petersburg with minimal troop protection. After crossing the James River, the Army of the Potomac, without any resistance, marched towards Petersburg. After crossing the James, Grant rescued Butler from the Bermuda Hundred and sent the XVIII corps led by Brig. Gen. William F. "Baldy" Smith to capture the weakly protected Petersburg, which was guarded by Confederate General P.G.T. Beauregard. Grant established his new headquarters at City Point for the rest of the Civil War. The Union forces quickly attacked and overtook Petersburg's outlying trenches on June 15. However, Smith inexplicably stopped fighting and waited until the following day, June 16, to attack the city, allowing Beauregard to concentrate reinforcements in secondary field works. The second Union attack on Petersburg started on June 16 and lasted until June 18, when Lee's veterans finally arrived to keep the Union army from taking the important railroad junction. Unable to break Lee's Petersburg defenses, Grant had to settle for a siege.

Realizing that Washington was left unprotected due to Grant's siege of Petersburg, Lee detached a corps under the command of Lieutenant General Jubal A. Early, hoping it would force the Union army to send forces to pursue him. If Early could capture Washington, the Civil War would not have ended, but the Confederates would have embarrassed the Union and deeply wounded northern morale. Early, with 15,000 seasoned troops, marched north "down" the Shenandoah Valley, defeated Union Major General Lew Wallace at the Monocacy, and following the Battle of Fort Stevens, he reached the outskirts of Washington, causing great alarm. At Lincoln's urging, Grant dispatched the veteran Union VI Corps and parts of the XIX Corps, led by Major General Horatio Wright, to the capital. With the Union XXII Corps manning Washington's fortifications, Early was unable to take the city. The Confederate Army's mere presence close to the capital was still an embarrassment. At Petersburg, Grant blew up a section of Lee's trenches with gunpowder planted inside a huge mine tunnel dug by Pennsylvanian coal miners. The explosion dug a huge crater and opened a big gap in the Confederate line. The Union assault that followed, however, was slow and chaotic, with troops milling around inside the Crater. This allowed Lee to repulse the breakthrough.

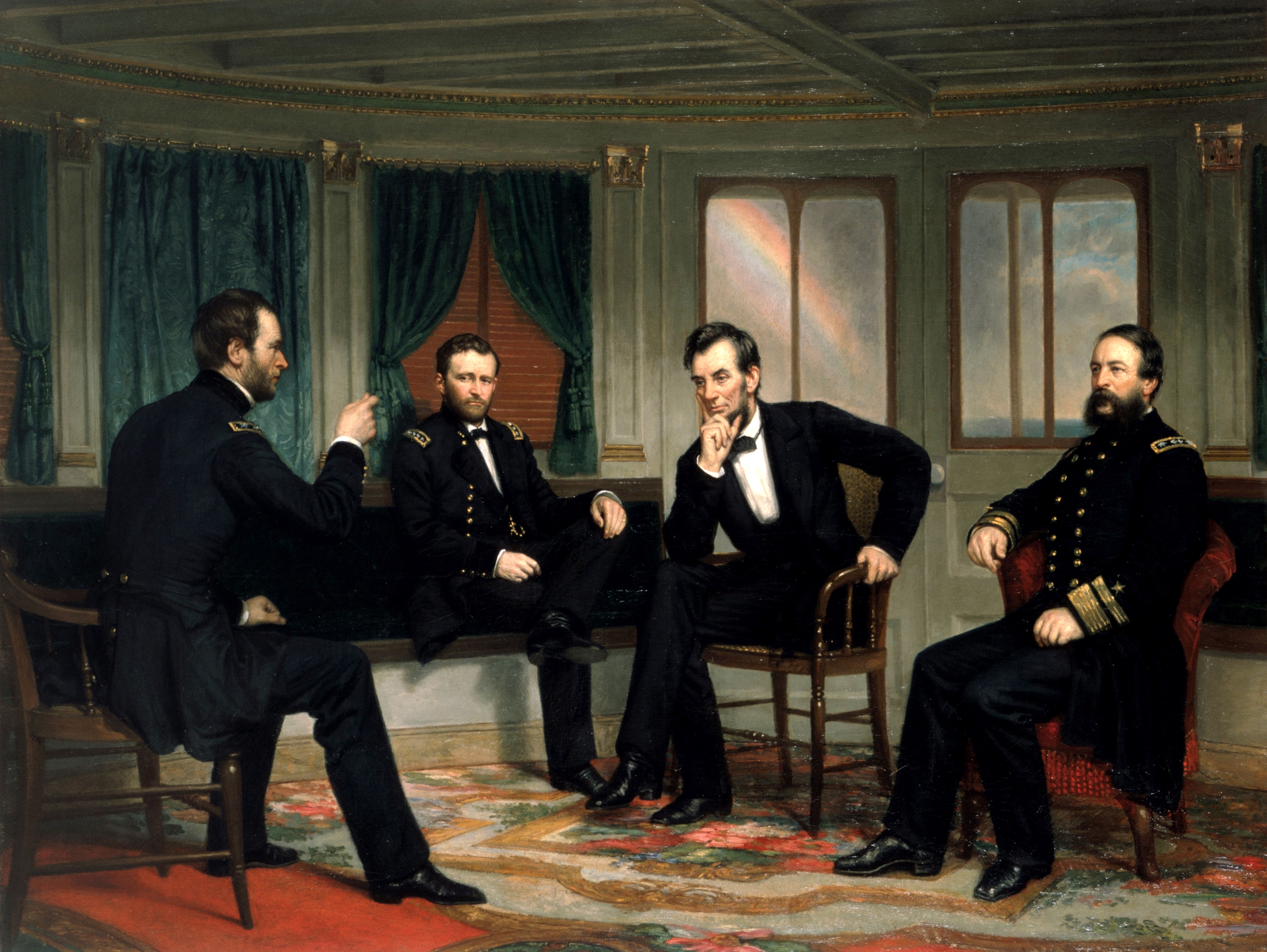
The Peacemakers depicts the March 1865 strategy session among William Tecumseh Sherman, Ulysses S. Grant, Abraham Lincoln, and David Dixon Porter during the final days of the Civil War.

Despite the setback with the Crater incident and a Congressional investigation that followed, Grant was able to lock in Lee and the Army of Northern Virginia at Petersburg. Grant's Union siege at Petersburg allowed the Union war effort on other fronts to finally bear fruit. Sherman took Atlanta on September 2, 1864, and began his March to the Sea in November. With victories at Atlanta and Mobile Bay, Lincoln was re-elected President and the war effort continued. On October 19, after three battles, Philip Sheridan and the Army of the Shenandoah defeated Early's army. Sheridan and Sherman followed Lincoln and Grant's strategy of total war by destroying the economic infrastructure of the Shenandoah Valley and a large swath of Georgia and the Carolinas. On December 16, Maj. Gen. George H. Thomas beat Confederate general John B. Hood at Nashville. Grant continued for months to stretch the Petersburg siege line westward to capture vital railroad lines that supplied Richmond, stretching Lee's defensive works thin.

In March 1865, Grant invited Lincoln to visit his headquarters at City Point, Virginia. By coincidence, Sherman (then campaigning in North Carolina) happened to visit City Point at the same time. This allowed for the war's only three-way meeting of Lincoln, Grant, and Sherman, which was memorialized in G.P.A. Healy's famous painting The Peacemakers. Grant continued to apply months of relentless military pressure at Petersburg on the Army of Northern Virginia until Lee was forced to evacuate Richmond in April 1865. After a nine-day retreat, during which Grant expertly maneuvered his armies to block all paths of retreat, Lee surrendered his army at Appomattox Court House on April 9, 1865. Considered his greatest triumph, this was the third time a Confederate Army surrendered to Grant. There, Grant offered generous terms that did much to ease tensions between the armies and preserve some semblance of Southern pride, which was needed to reunite the warring sides. Within a few weeks, the American Civil War was over, though minor actions continued until Kirby Smith surrendered his forces in the Trans-Mississippi Department on June 2, 1865.

== Historical reputation and aftermath ==
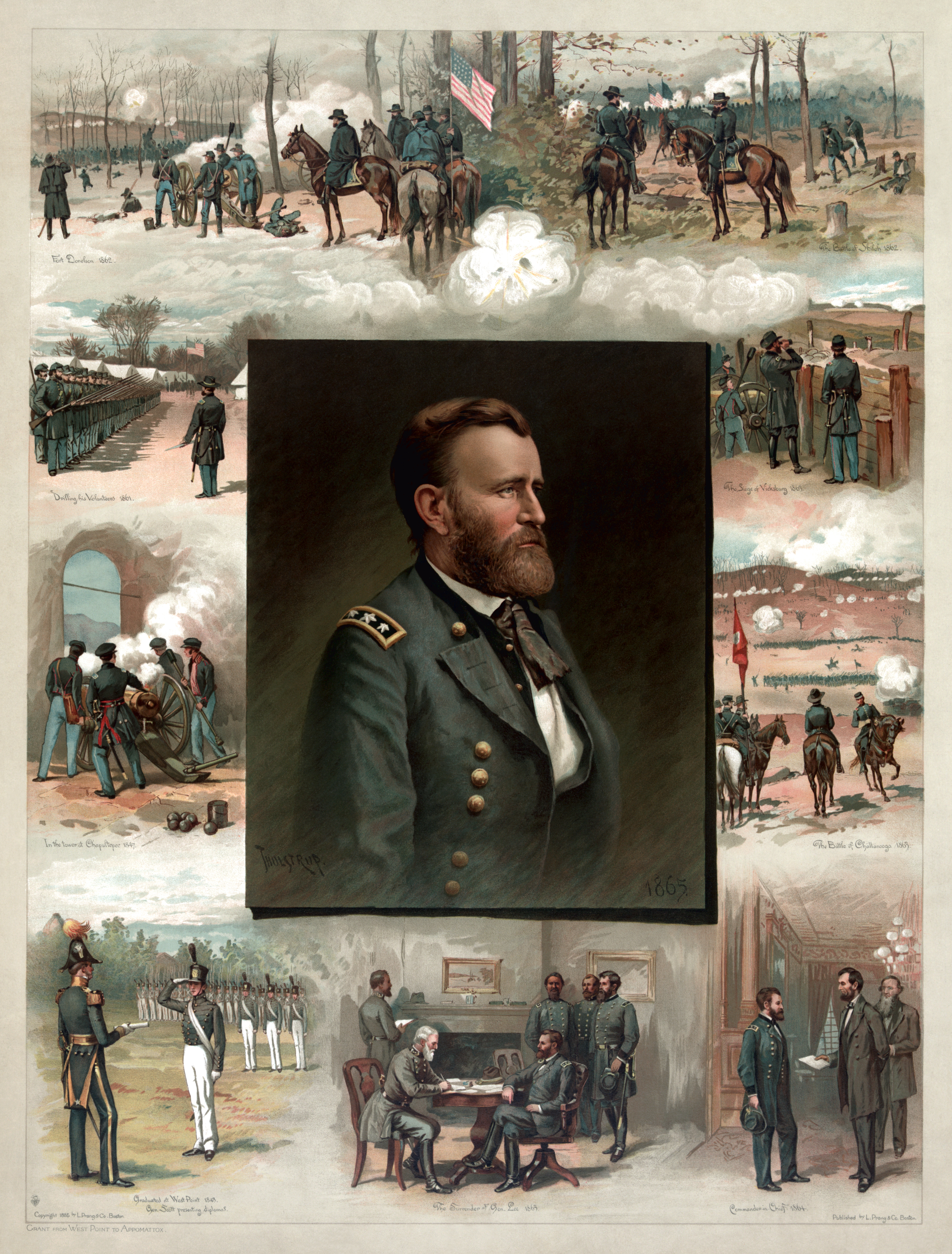
Clockwise from lower left: Grant graduates from West Point (1843); Grant in the tower at Chapultepec (1847); Grant drilling his volunteers (1861); Grant in the battle of Fort Donelson (1862); Grant in the battle of Shiloh (1862); Grant in the siege of Vicksburg (1863); Grant in the Chattanooga campaign (1863); Grant being appointed lieutenant general by Lincoln (1864); Lee surrendering to Grant at Appomattox Court House (1865)

Grant was a very popular man in the United States after the American Civil War. After President Lincoln was assassinated in April 1865, Grant became America's first four-star general and would aid Congress, led by the Radicals, in their effort to reconstruct the South. Grant often disagreed with President Andrew Johnson's conservative approach during the Reconstruction Era of the United States. Grant was looked on as a popular national leader who could mend the nation's wounds and bring in an era of peace. Grant was able to oust the French from Mexico as commanding general under Johnson and also able to thwart a Fenian Brotherhood attempted takeover of Canada. Grant was also in charge of Indian campaigns on the Western frontier. Elected President twice in 1868 and 1872 Grant's terms in office were filled with federal corruption scandals and sectional violence over the constitutional citizenship rights of African Americans.

Grant, as President, supported the efforts of Congress to protect the Civil Rights of African Americans and was able for a few years to legally and militarily defeat the Ku Klux Klan. After Grant retired from the Presidency, he went on an unprecedented World tour visiting Europe, the Mid East, and Asia, returning by ship to San Francisco in June, 1879. In March 1885, with the help of his friends in Congress, President Chester A. Arthur authorized Grant to be reinstated into the U.S. military in order to receive retirement pay. Grant then was reinstated his full rank in the U.S. military by President Grover Cleveland, whereupon Grant and his family received much needed full military retirement pay. In 1885, Grant finished his popular and financially successful military memoirs and died after a painful struggle with throat cancer.

Toward the end of Grant's life, the semi-religious cultic Lost Cause movement in the South propped up Robert E. Lee, who had surrendered to Grant at Appomattox, as the greatest general during the Civil War, and elevated Lee, rather than Grant, to a god-like status. This false view permeated throughout American society. Grant was viewed as a drunk and butcher who had won only because he waged a brutal war of attrition. Historian Edward H. Bonekemper counters this view and says that Grant was the most successful general of the Civil War, noting that in the West, Grant drove the Confederates out of the Mississippi Valley through a series of battles and campaigns, including Fort Donelson, Vicksburg, and Chattanooga. When Grant was brought back East and put in command of the Union Army, he was able to defeat Lee's Confederate army within a year and effectively brought the war to a close. According to Bonekemper, Grant's armies were more destructive than Confederate armies. Grant's Union armies in the West and East that battled Confederate armies, inflicted more casualties, a total of 190,760 Confederate versus 153,643 Union, a difference of 37,118.

== Dates of rank ==
Insignia	Rank	Date	Component
No insignia	Cadet, USMA	1 July 1839	Regular Army
	Brevet Second Lieutenant	1 July 1843	Regular Army
	Second Lieutenant	30 September 1845	Regular Army
	Brevet First Lieutenant	8 September 1847	Regular Army
	First Lieutenant	16 September 1847	Regular Army
	Captain	5 August 1853	Regular Army (Resigned 31 July 1854.)
	Colonel	17 June 1861	Volunteers
	Brigadier General	7 August 1861	Volunteers (To rank from 17 May 1861.)
	Major General	16 February 1862	Volunteers
	Major General	4 July 1863	Regular Army
	Lieutenant General	4 March 1864	Regular Army
	General	25 July 1866	Regular Army

== List of Union western ranks and commands 1861 to 1863 ==
- Army and Department of the Tennessee Brigadier General – August 1, 1861, to February 14, 1862
- District and Army of West Tennessee Major General – February 21 to October 16, 1862
- Department and Army of the Tennessee Major General – October 16, 1862, to October 24, 1863

== Union vs. Confederate casualties estimated ==
Western campaigns and Battles of Ulysses S. Grant

- Total Union casualties under Grant: 36,688
- Total Confederate casualties: 84,187

Eastern campaigns and Battles of Ulysses S. Grant

- Total Union casualties under Grant: 116,954
- Total Confederate casualties: 106,573

Totals Western and Eastern campaigns and Battles of Ulysses S. Grant

- Total Union casualties under Grant: 153,642
- Total Confederate casualties: 190,760
- Net casualties difference: (37,118)

Note: killed, wounded, missing, or captured included.

== See also ==
- Charles de Gaulle during World War II

== Sources ==
- Axelrod, Alan (2011). Generals South Generals North The Commanders of the Civil War Reconsidered (ebook). Lyons Press. ISBN 978-0-7627-8849-1.
- Badeau, Adam. Military History of Ulysses S. Grant, from April, 1861, to April, 1865. New York: D. Appleton, 1881.
- Ballard, Michael B. Vicksburg, The Campaign that Opened the Mississippi. Chapel Hill: University of North Carolina Press, 2004. ISBN 0-8078-2893-9.
- Bearss, Edwin C. The Vicksburg Campaign. Dayton, Ohio: Morningside, 1991. ISBN 0-89029-308-2.
- Brands, H. W. (2012). The Man Who Saved the Union: Ulysses S. Grant in War and Peace. New York: Doubleday. ISBN 978-0-385-53241-9.
- Bonekemper, Edward H., III. A Victor, Not a Butcher: Ulysses S. Grant's Overlooked Military Genius. Washington, DC: Regnery Pub., 2004. ISBN 0-89526-062-X.
- Bonekemper, Edward H. (2012). Grant and Lee Victorious American and Vanquished Virginian. Washington D.C.: Regnery History. ISBN 978-1-62157-010-3.
- Carter, Samuel III. The Final Fortress: The Campaign for Vicksburg, 1862–1863. New York: St. Martin's Press, 1980.
- Catton, Bruce (1960). Grant Moves South. Boston: Little, Brown. ISBN 0-316-13207-1.
- —— (1968). Grant Takes Command. Boston: Little, Brown. ISBN 0-316-13210-1.
- —— (1954). U. S. Grant and the American Military Tradition. Boston: Little, Brown.
- Cavanaugh, Michael A., and William Marvel. The Petersburg Campaign: The Battle of the Crater: "The Horrid Pit," June 25 – August 6, 1864. Lynchburg, Va.: H.E. Howard, 1989.
- Davis, William C. Death in the Trenches: Grant at Petersburg. Alexandria, Va.: Time-Life Books, 1986.
- Eicher, David J. The Longest Night: A Military History of the Civil War. New York: Simon & Schuster, 2001. ISBN 0-684-84944-5.
- Eicher, John H., and Eicher, David J. Civil War High Commands. Stanford, Calif.: Stanford University Press, 2001. ISBN 0-8047-3641-3.
- Fuller, Maj. Gen. J. F. C. Grant and Lee, a Study in Personality and Generalship. Bloomington: Indiana University Press, 1957. ISBN 0-253-13400-5.
- Farina, William. Ulysses S. Grant, 1861–1864: His Rise from Obscurity to Military Greatness. Jefferson, N.C.: McFarland & Co., 2007.
- Gott, Kendall D. Where the South Lost the War: An Analysis of the Fort Henry-Fort Donelson Campaign, February 1862. Mechanicsburg, PA: Stackpole Books, 2003. ISBN 0-8117-0049-6.
- Korda, Michael. Ulysses S. Grant: The Unlikely Hero. New York: Atlas Books/HarperCollins, 2004.
- Lewis, Lloyd. Captain Sam Grant. Boston: Little, Brown, and Co., 1950. ISBN 0-316-52348-8.
- McWhiney, Grady. Battle in the Wilderness: Grant Meets Lee. Fort Worth: Ryan Place Publishers, 1995.
- McDonough, James Lee. Shiloh: In Hell Before Night. Knoxville: University of Tennessee Press, 1977.
- McDonough, James Lee. Chattanooga: A Death Grip on the Confederacy. Knoxville: University of Tennessee Press, 1984.
- McPherson, James M. Battle Cry of Freedom: The Civil War Era. New York: Oxford University Press, 1988. ISBN 0-19-503863-0.
- Maney, R. Wayne. Marching to Cold Harbor. Victory and Failure, 1864. Shippensburg, Pa., USA: White Mane Pub. Co., 1994.
- Matter, William D. If It Takes All Summer: The Battle of Spotsylvania. Chapel Hill: University of North Carolina Press, 1988.
- McFeely, William S. (1974). Woodward C. Vann (ed.). Responses of the Presidents to Charges of Misconduct. New York, New York: Delacorte Press. pp. 133–162. ISBN 0-440-05923-2.
- Miers, Earl Schenck. The Web of Victory: Grant at Vicksburg. New York: Knopf, 1955.
- Mosier, John. Grant. New York: Palgrave MacMillan, 2006. ISBN 1-4039-7136-6.
- Rhea, Gordon C. The Battle of the Wilderness May 5–6, 1864. Louisiana State University Press, 1994. ISBN 0-8071-1873-7.
- Rhea, Gordon C. The Battles for Spotsylvania Court House and the Road to Yellow Tavern May 7–12, 1864. Louisiana State University Press, 1997. ISBN 0-8071-2136-3.
- Rhea, Gordon C. To the North Anna River: Grant and Lee, May 13–25, 1864. Louisiana State University Press, 2000. ISBN 0-8071-2535-0.
- Rhea, Gordon C., Cold Harbor: Grant and Lee, May 26 – June 3, 1864. Louisiana State University Press, 2002. ISBN 0-8071-2803-1.
- Miller, J. Michael. The North Anna Campaign: "Even to Hell Itself," May 21–26, 1864. Lynchburg, Va.: H.E. Howard, 1989.
- Schenker, Carl R., Jr. "Ulysses in His Tent: Halleck, Grant, Sherman, and 'The Turning Point of the War'". Civil War History (June 2010), vol. 56, no. 2, p. 175.
- Simpson, Brooks D. "Continuous Hammering and Mere Attrition: Lost Cause Critics and the Military Reputation of Ulysses S. Grant". The Myth of the Lost Cause and Civil War History. Bloomington: Indiana University Press, 2000.
- Simpson, Brooks D. "After Shiloh: Grant, Sherman, and Survival". The Shiloh Campaign. Carbondale: Southern Illinois University Press, 2009.
- Steere, Edward. The Wilderness Campaign. Harrisburg, Pa.: Stackpole Co., 1960.
- Sword, Wiley. Shiloh: Bloody April. New York: Morrow, 1974.
- White, Ronald C. (2016). American Ulysses: A Life of Ulysses S. Grant. Random House Publishing Group. ISBN 978-1-5883-6992-5.
- Williams, Kenneth P. Lincoln Finds a General: A Military Study of the Civil War. New York, Macmillan, 1959 (volume 5).
- Williams, T. Harry, McClellan, Sherman and Grant. New Brunswick, N.J.: Rutgers University Press, 1962.
- Woodworth, Steven E. Nothing but Victory: The Army of the Tennessee, 1861 – 1865. New York: Alfred A. Knopf, 2005. ISBN 0-375-41218-2.

Military offices
Preceded by Henry W. Halleck	Commanding General of the United States Army; 1864 – 1869	Succeeded by William T. Sherman
New title	Commander, Military Division of the Mississippi; 1863 – 1864	Succeeded by William T. Sherman
New title	Commander, Army of the Tennessee; 1862 – 1863	Succeeded by William T. Sherman
