= Abraham Lincoln (Healy) =

1869 painting by George P. A. Healy

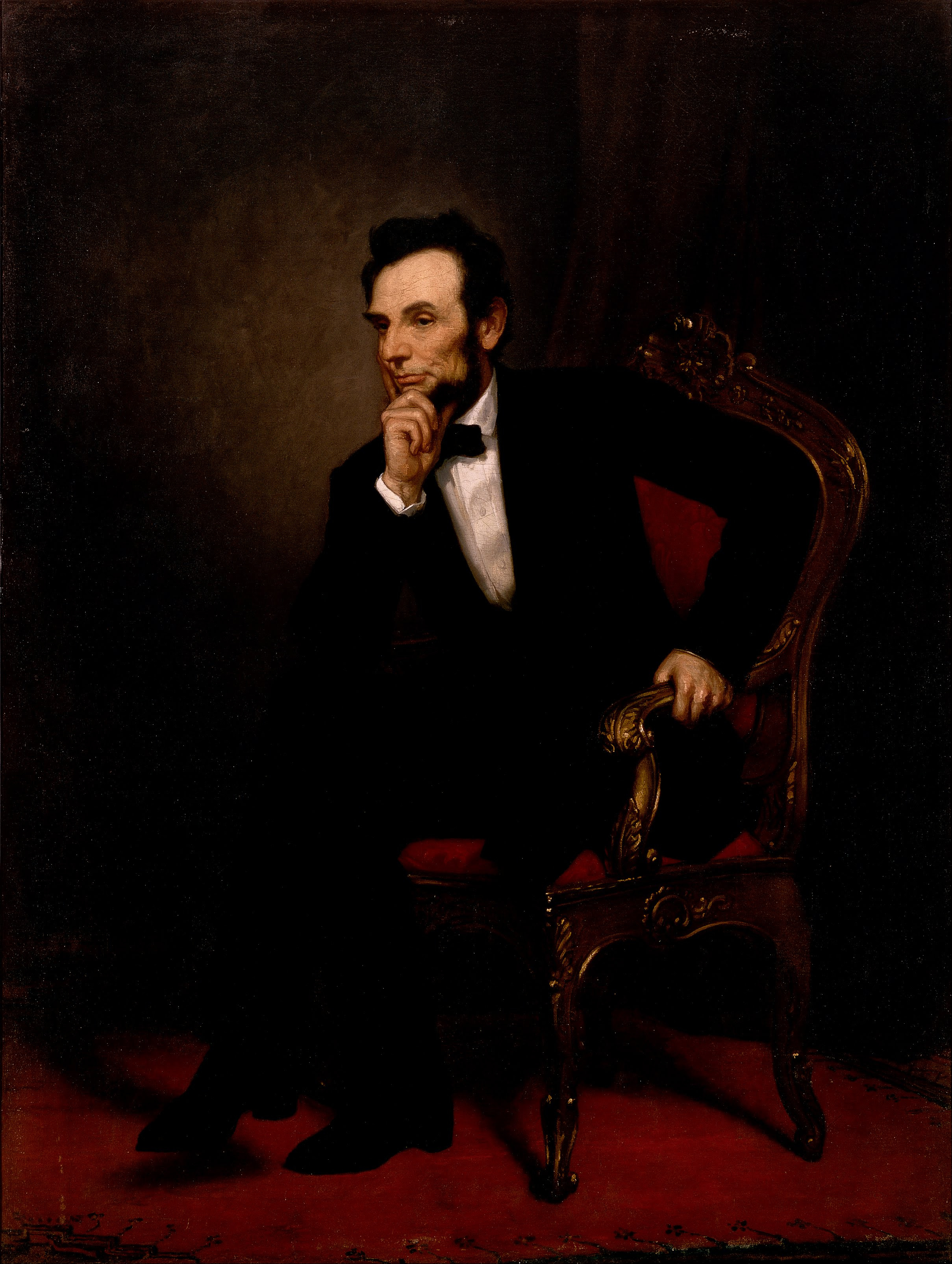
- Artist: George Peter Alexander Healy
- Year: 1869
- Medium: Oil on canvas
- Dimensions: 187.3 cm × 141.3 cm (73.7 in × 55.6 in)
- Location: State Dining Room, White House, Washington, D.C.

Abraham Lincoln is an 1869 oil-on-canvas painting by George Peter Alexander Healy of Abraham Lincoln, the 16th president of the United States.

In the painting, a contemplative Lincoln is observed alone, leaning forward in a chair, with his elbow on his knee and his head resting on his hand. Lincoln's pose was inspired by Healy's 1868 painting, The Peacemakers, which depicts Lincoln and others in an historic 1865 strategy session of the Union high command, during the final days of the American Civil War.

== History ==
Lincoln sat for Healy in August 1864, and Healy began working on his sketches to create a portrait of Lincoln. After Lincoln's assassination in April 1865, Healy conceived of The Peacemakers, which he completed in 1868. In 1869, 4 years after the assassination of Lincoln, Healy decided to create a new portrait removing the members of Lincoln's high command to focus only on Lincoln. He painted the portrait in Paris.

On March 3, 1869, an act of Congress authorized the commission of a portrait of Lincoln to hang in the White House. As a result, Healy sent it to Washington, hoping it would be chosen. However, Ulysses S. Grant, then the president of the United States selected a more formal, high art portrait painted by William F. Cogswell. Robert Todd Lincoln, Lincoln's son, purchased Healy's portrait. He said of Healy's portrait: "I have never seen a portrait of my father which is to be compared with it in any way." The portrait was owned by Robert Todd Lincoln's widow, Mary Harlan Lincoln, who bequeathed it to her daughter, Mamie Lincoln Isham, with the understanding that it would be eventually given to the White House. It entered the White House collection after Isham's death in 1938. It hangs in the State Dining Room of the White House.

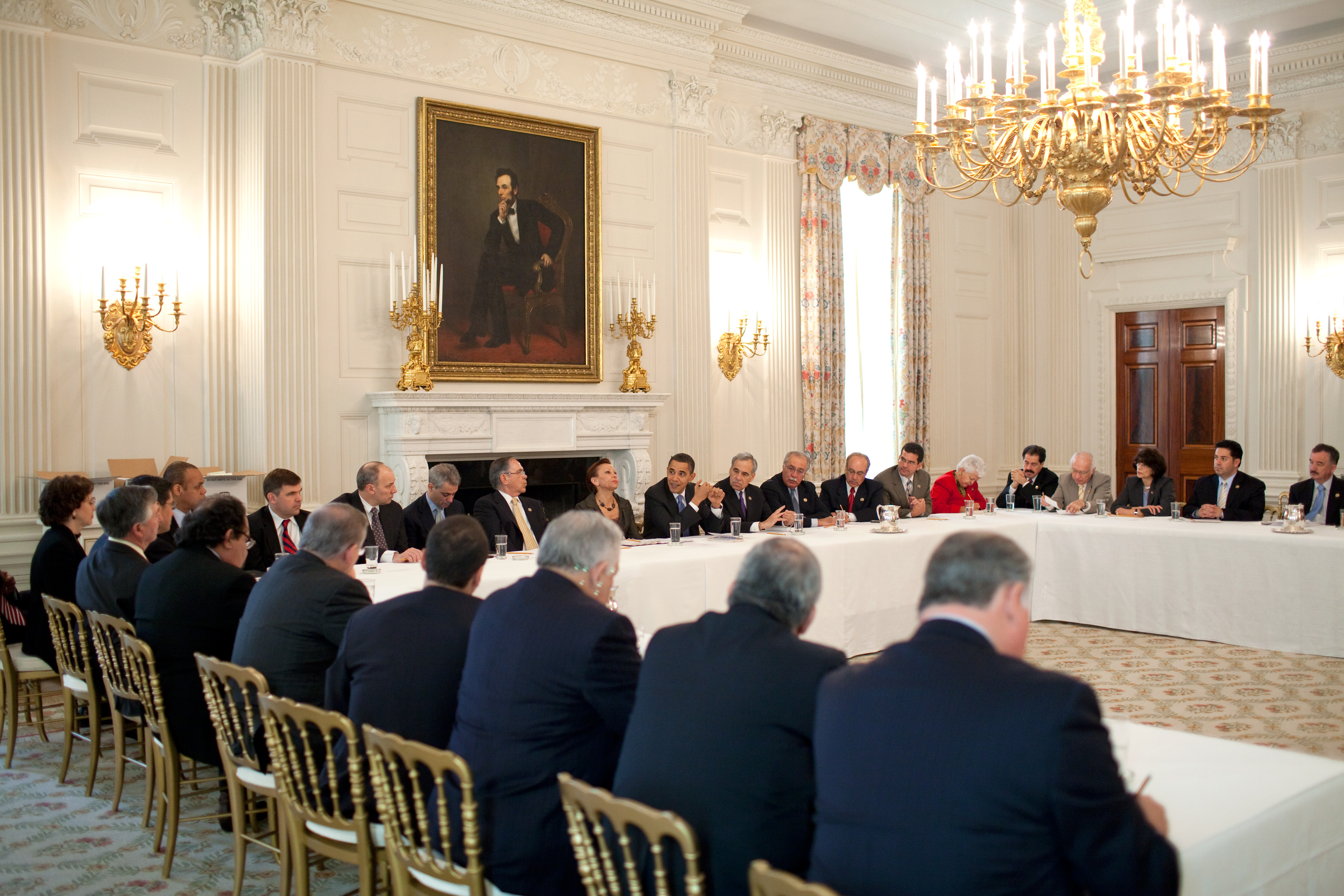
Abraham Lincoln hanging in the State Dining Room in 2009

First Lady Lady Bird Johnson identified the painting as one of her favorites in the White House. Though Richard Nixon had moved the portrait from the State Dining Room, replacing it with Cropsey's View of the Palisades on the Hudson, Gerald Ford had the portrait moved back to its longstanding placement.

An 1887 copy of the painting, originally commissioned by Elihu Washburne and reproduced by Healy in his Paris studio, is owned by the Smithsonian National Portrait Gallery; it was last on display in 2022, and as of August 2026, was being restored by a Baltimore based art conservator. Reproductions of the portrait also hangs in the Illinois Governor's Mansion in Springfield, Illinois and the Minnesota House of Representatives chamber behind the speaker's chair.

== See also ==
- Art in the White House
- List of paintings of Abraham Lincoln
