= William Willard (painter) =

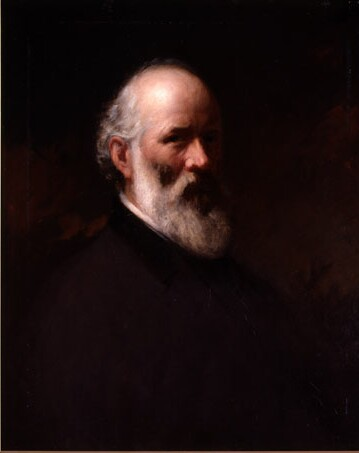
- Born: 24 March 1819; Sturbridge (CDP), Massachusetts
- Died: 1 November 1904 (aged 85); Worcester, Massachusetts

William Willard (March 24, 1819 – November 1, 1904) was an American painter.

Willard was the son of a blacksmith and was first trained as a jeweler, but was more interested in drawing. From 1841 to 1867 he worked as a painter in Boston. In 1867 he returned to Sturbridge where he set up a studio on his property to receive sitters for portraits. His most famous work is his portrait of Lincoln that became a model for the Lincoln Penny.

Willard died in Worcester. His studio and its contents were bequeathed to his friend Stephen Salisbury III who in turn left them to the Worcester Art Museum.

== Personal life ==
Willard was the son of Seth Willard (1782–1843) and his wife, Susan (née Fay) Willard (1782–1876). His 4th great-grandfather was Edmund Rice, an early settler to the Massachusetts Bay Colony. His second cousin, Henry Clinton Jaynes (1827–1905), was the great-grandfather of actor Henry Fonda.

== Works ==
He is best known for portraits of famous people, but he also made some landscape paintings. He is recorded using photography to aid him in his preparations and to speed the sittings for his customers. Photography was considered a mechanical art and he would accompany a sitter to a photographer's studio and give directions for the position and lighting that most resembled his studio situation with the light coming from above.

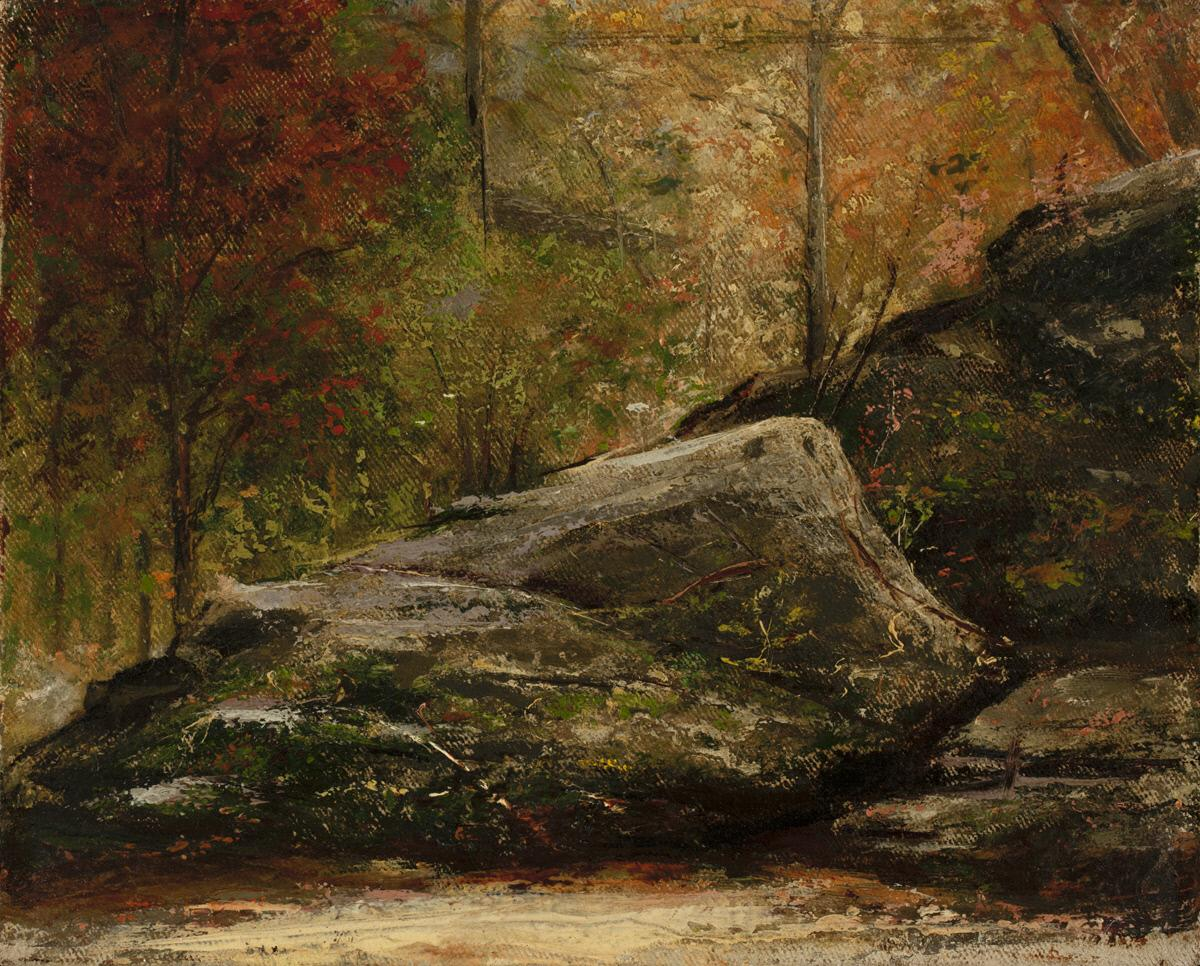
Landscape with Rocks, Salisbury collection

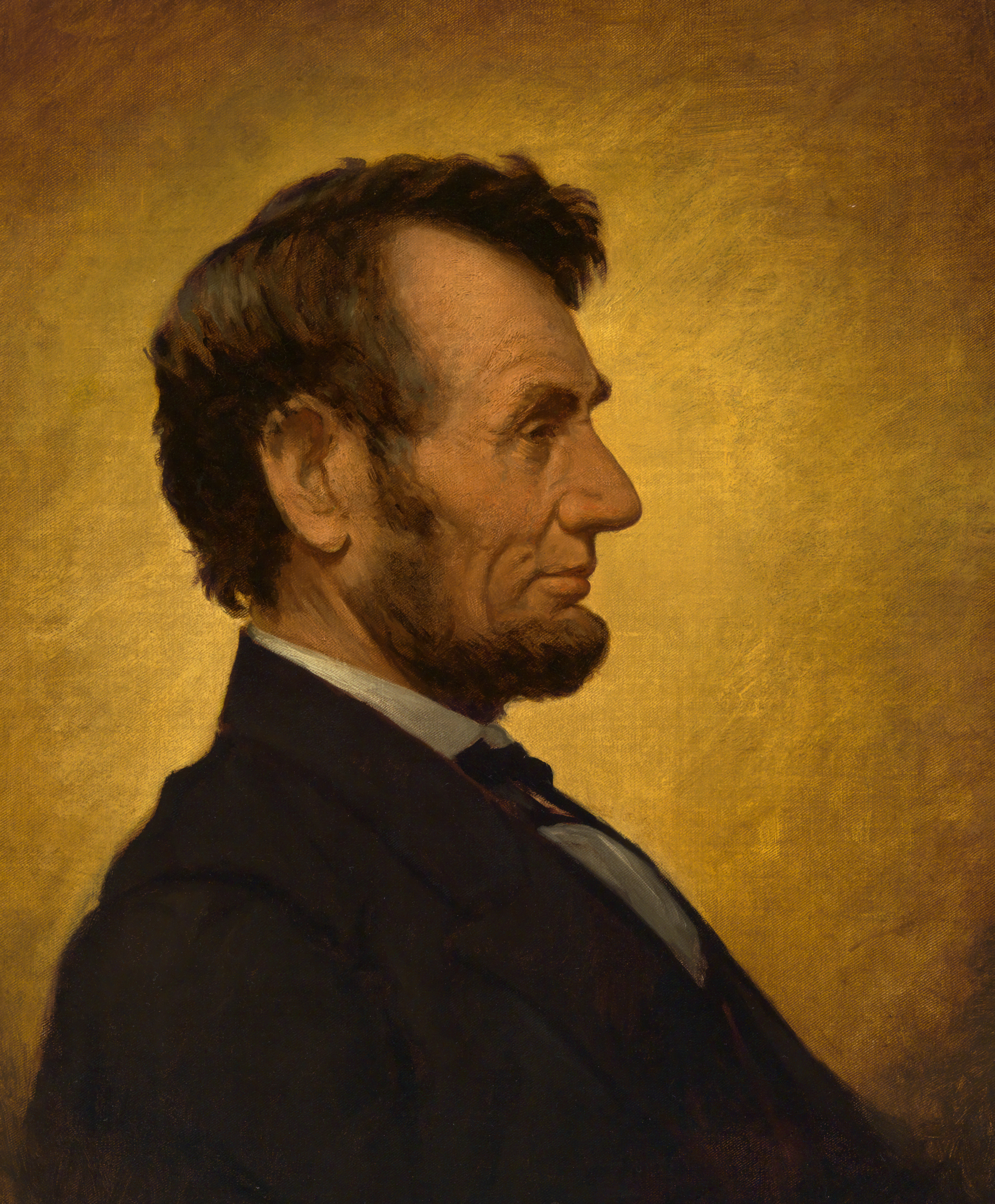
Abraham Lincoln - The Penny Image, 1864, in the National Portrait Gallery

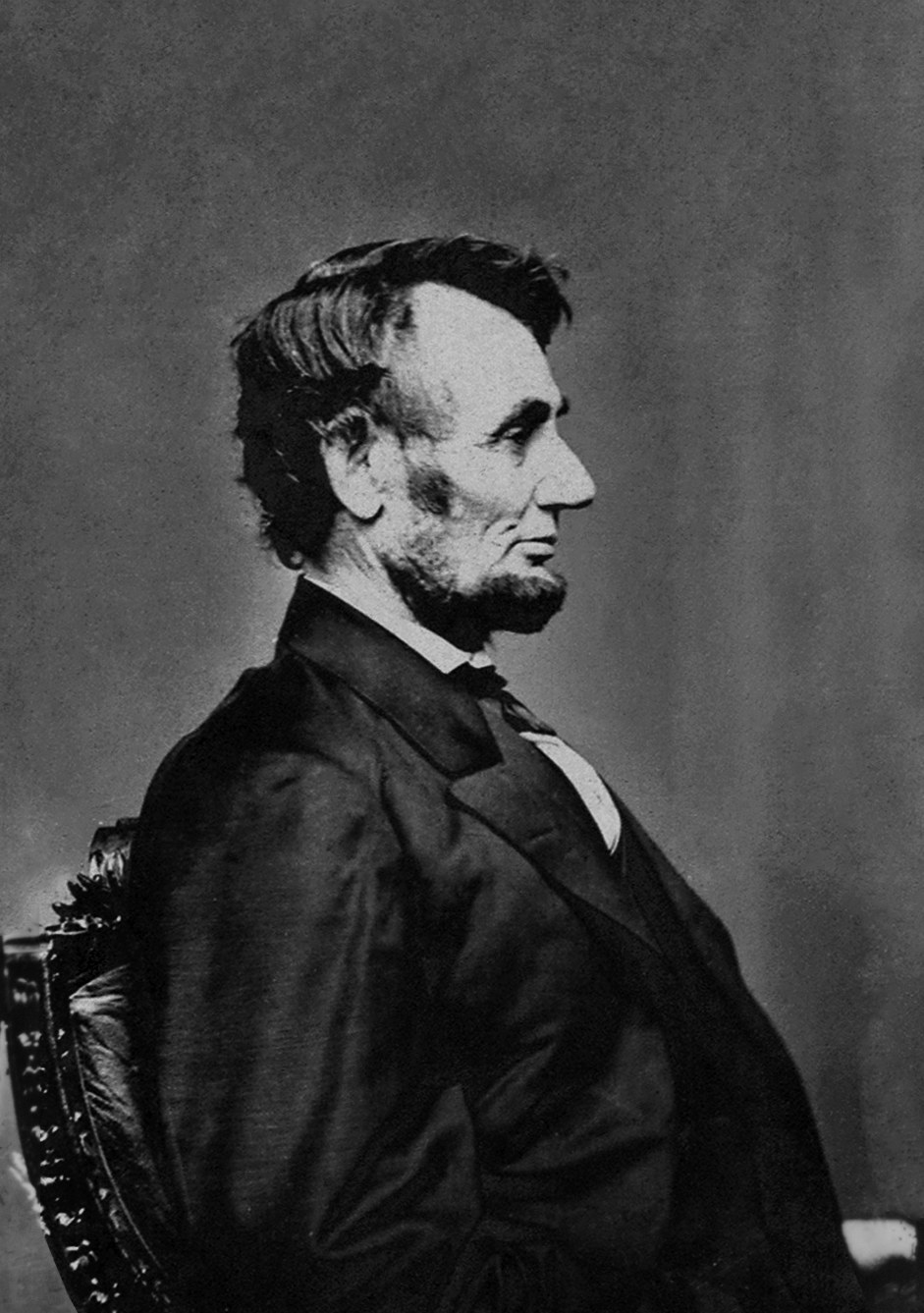
Photograph of Lincoln that he used for his portrait

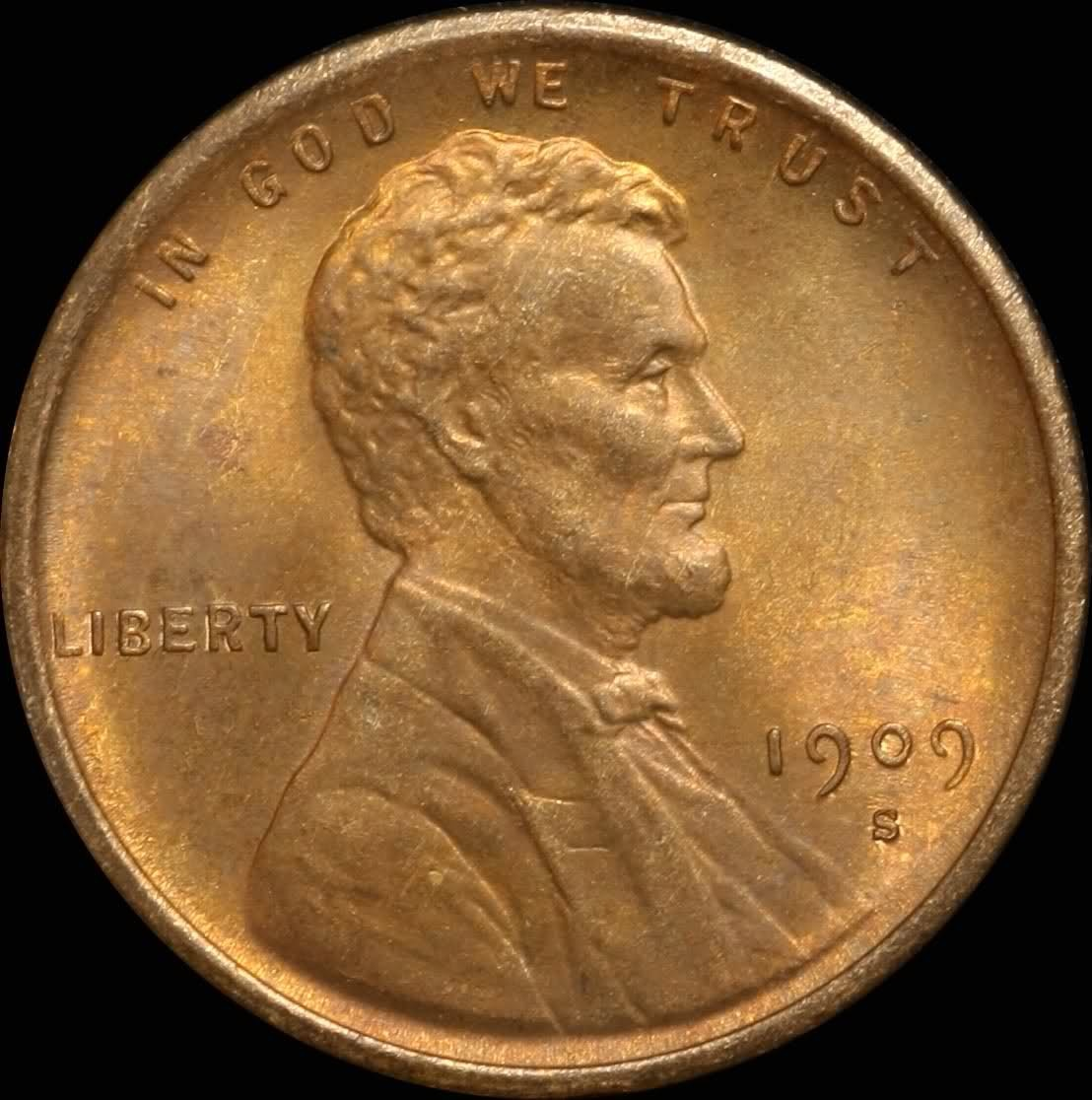
Lincoln cent
