= The Peacemakers =

1868 painting by George P.A. Healy

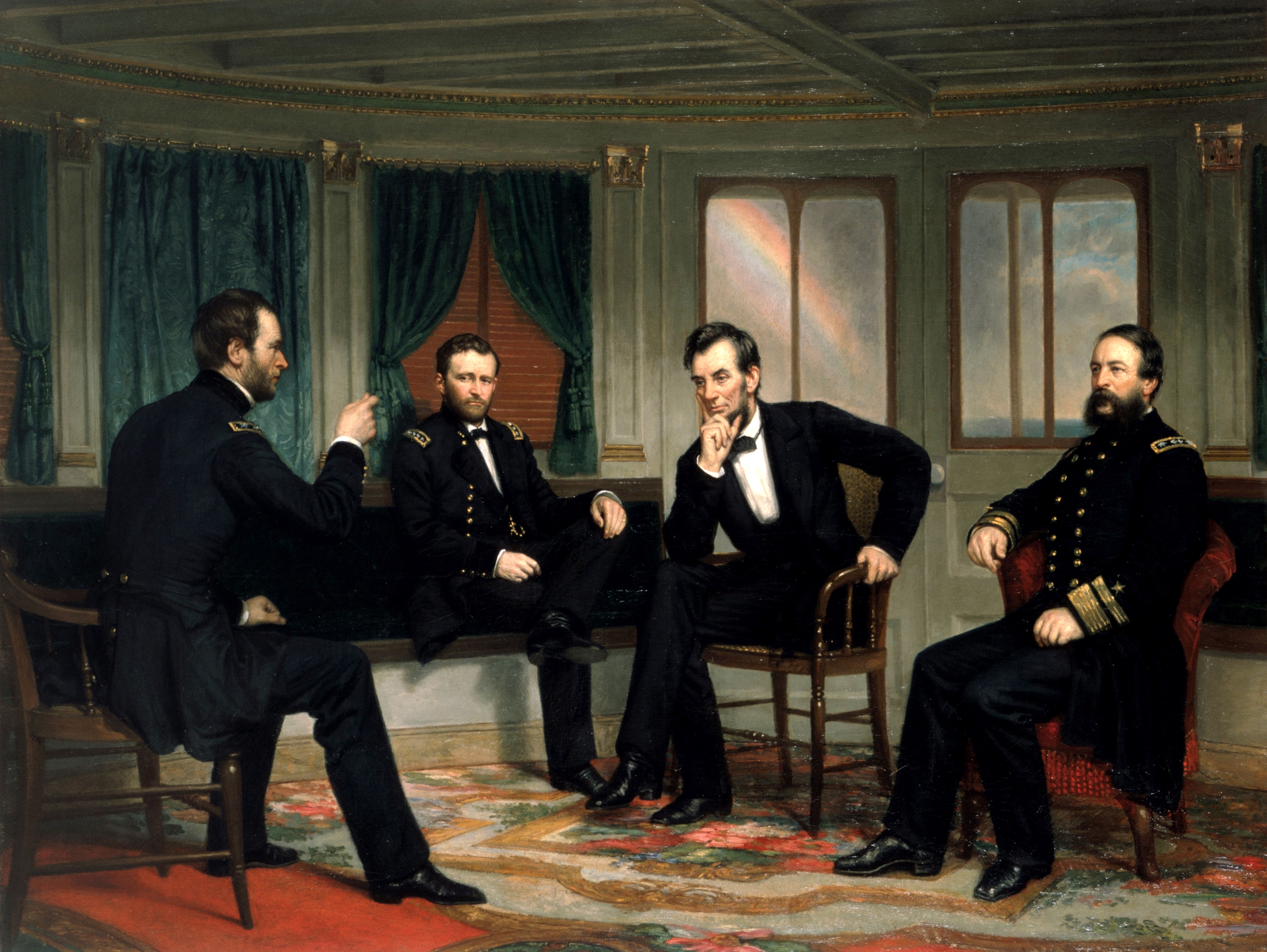
- Artist: George P.A. Healy
- Year: 1868; 158 years ago
- Medium: Oil on canvas
- Dimensions: 119.7 cm × 159.1 cm (47 1/8 in × 62 5/8 in)
- Location: White House, Washington D.C.

The Peacemakers is an 1868 painting by the American artist George P.A. Healy. It depicts the historic March 27, 1865, strategy session by the Union high command on the steamer River Queen during the final days of the American Civil War. Although he painted it in at least two versions, the largest was destroyed by fire in 1893, and the second sat unknown in storage for decades. Since 1947, it has been in the White House collection.

== Historical setting ==
In March 1865, General-in-Chief Ulysses S. Grant invited President Lincoln to visit his headquarters at City Point, Virginia. By coincidence, Major General William Tecumseh Sherman (then campaigning in North Carolina) happened to visit City Point at the same time. This allowed for the war's only three-way meeting of President Lincoln, General Grant, and General Sherman. Also present was Rear Admiral David Dixon Porter, who wrote about the meeting in his journal, and later recounted:

I shall never forget that council which met on board the River Queen. On the determinations adopted there depended peace, or a continuation of the war with its attendant horrors. That council has been illustrated in a fine painting by Mr. Healy, the artist, who, in casting about for the subject of an historical picture, hit upon this interview, which really was an occasion upon which depended whether or not the war would be continued a year longer. A single false step might have prolonged it indefinitely.

== Painting ==
=== Studies ===
Healy painted several preparation studies, including studies for Lincoln, Grant, and Porter, which still survive in the collection of the Newberry Library in Chicago.

=== General Sherman's recollection ===
The artist was not present at the meeting near Richmond, which is the subject of the painting. However, he had previously painted individual portraits of the four men and from General Sherman, he had obtained information about the meeting. In a November 28, 1872 letter to Isaac Newton Arnold, General Sherman wrote:

In Chicago about June or July of that year, when all the facts were fresh in my mind, I told them to George P. A. Healy, the artist, who was casting about for a subject for an historical painting, and he adopted this interview. Mr. Lincoln was then dead, but Healy had a portrait, which he himself had made at Springfield some five or six years before. With this portrait, some existing photographs, and the strong resemblance in form of [Leonard Swett], of Chicago, to Mr. Lincoln he made the picture of Mr. Lincoln seen in this group. For General Grant, Admiral Porter, and myself he had actual sittings, and I am satisfied the four portraits in this group of Healy's are the best extant. The original picture, life-size, is, I believe, now in Chicago, the property of Mr. [Ezra Butler McCagg]; but Healy afterwards, in Rome, painted ten smaller copies, about eighteen by twenty-four inches, one of which I now have, and it is now within view. I think the likeness of Mr. Lincoln by far the best of the many I have seen elsewhere, and those of General Grant, Admiral Porter, and myself equally good and faithful. I think Admiral Porter gave Healy a written description of our relative positions in that interview, also the dimensions, shape, and furniture of the cabin of the "Ocean Queen"; but the rainbow is Healy's—typical, of course, of the coming peace. In this picture I seem to be talking, the others attentively listening. Whether Healy made this combination from Admiral Porter's letter or not, I cannot say; but I thought that he caught the idea from what I told him had occurred when saying that "if Lee would only remain in Richmond till I could reach Burkesville, we would have him between our thumb and fingers," suiting the action to the word. It matters little what Healy meant by his historic group, but it is certain that we four sat pretty much as represented, and were engaged in an important conversation during the forenoon of March 28, 1865, and that we parted never to meet again.

=== Fate of original painting ===
The large life size version of the painting was destroyed in the 1893 Calumet Club fire in Chicago. The existing smaller version, also by Healy, was rediscovered in 1922, after lying unnoticed in a family storeroom in Chicago for fifty years. The acquisition of the painting by the Truman White House in 1947 was laden with contemporary significance, for another great conflict, World War II, had ended just two years earlier.

=== Legacy ===
Yet perhaps nowhere do we learn more about Lincoln even now than in a portrait that I talked about last month off the coast of Malta before meeting Chairman Gorbachev. It is, as this one is, by George Healy, and hangs on the wall of my office upstairs. And in it you see the agony and the greatness of a man who nightly fell on his knees to ask the help of God. The painting shows two of his generals and an admiral meeting near the end of a war that pitted brother against brother. And outside at the moment a battle rages. And yet what we see in the distance is a rainbow—a symbol of hope, of the passing of the storm. The painting's name: The Peacemakers. And for me, this is a constant reassurance that the cause of peace will triumph and that ours can be the future that Lincoln gave his life for: a future free of both tyranny and fear.

— George H. W. Bush, Remarks Introducing the Presidential Lecture Series, January 7th, 1990.

The pose of Lincoln inspired Healy's 1869 portrait, Abraham Lincoln. Robert Todd Lincoln considered the likeness of his father in this painting to be the "most excellent in existence."

The U.S. Postal Service commemorated the 200th anniversary of the birth of Abraham Lincoln by issuing four first-class commemorative 42-cent stamps. One of these stamps features an image of this painting.

The painting was displayed in the Treaty Room of the White House from the Kennedy through the George W. Bush presidencies. In his book Decision Points, President Bush mentions the painting specifically and makes the following comment: "Before 9/11, I saw the scene as a fascinating moment in history. After the attack, it took a deeper meaning. The painting reminded me of Lincoln's clarity of purpose: he waged war for a necessary and noble cause." It was briefly loaned to the George H. W. Bush Presidential Library from March 11, 2002, to July 31, 2002, for an exhibit entitled, "Fathers and Sons: Two Families, Four Presidents." The painting is also featured behind the elder Bush in his official presidential portrait, painted by Herbert Abrams.

The Obama administration moved the painting to the private Oval Office dining room in the West Wing. There is also a copy of the painting at the Pentagon.

In 2025, President Donald Trump had the painting placed over the Cabinet Room mantelpiece.

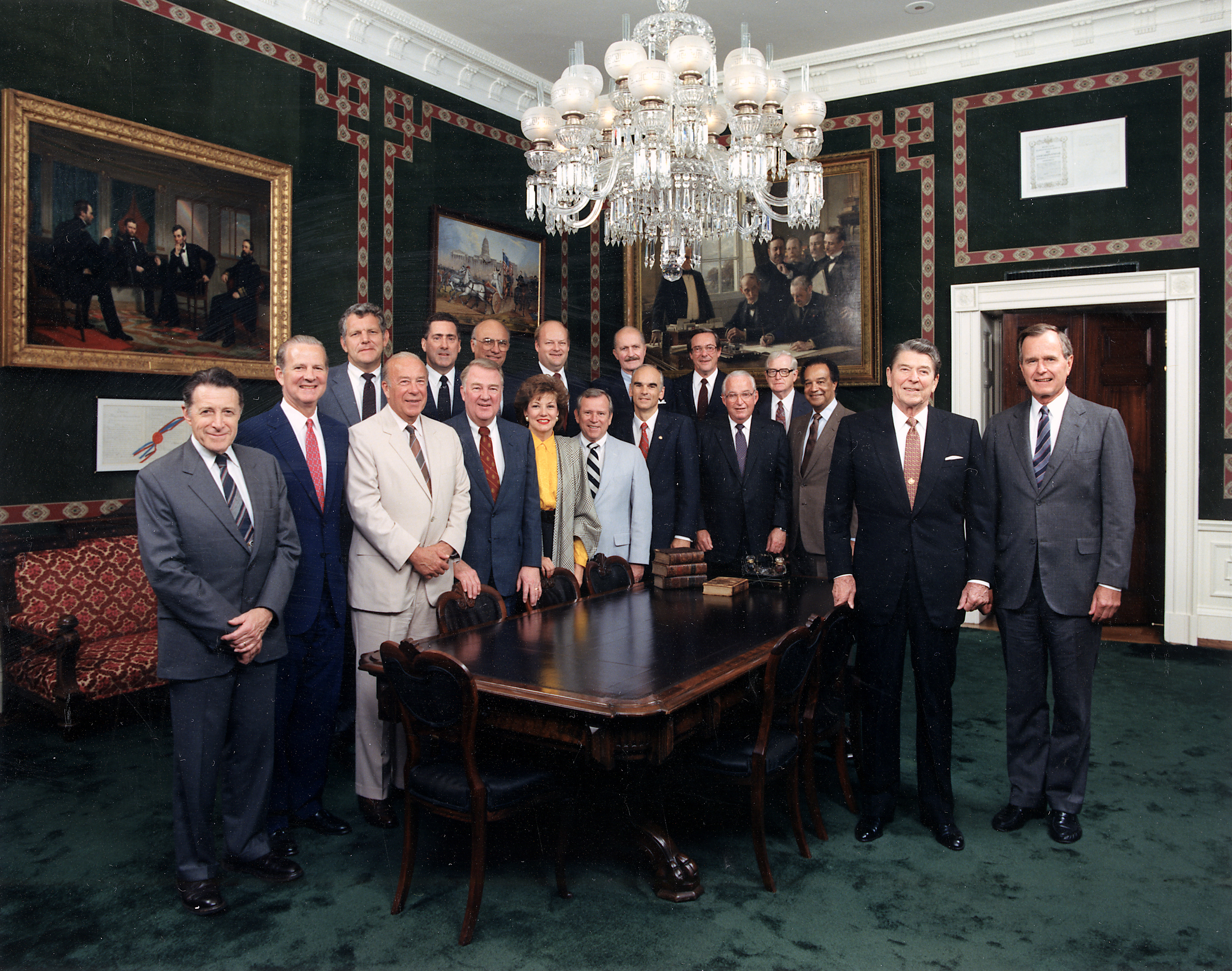
Photo of Ronald Reagan and his Cabinet in the Treaty Room where the painting used to hang, before it was moved to the Oval Office Dining Room. The painting is visible behind Reagan's Cabinet on the far left.

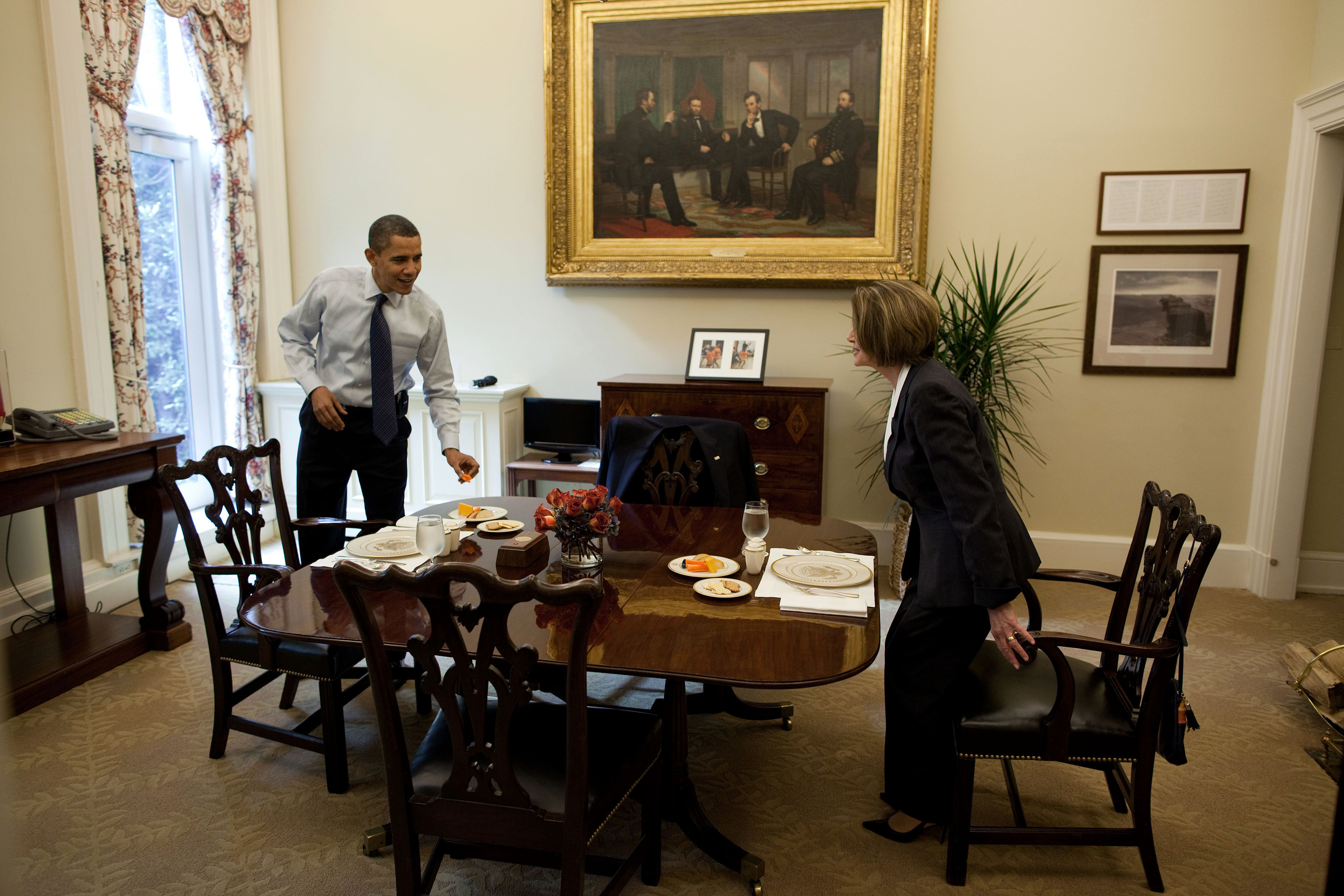
Painting within the Oval Office Dining Room. Pictured here are President Barack Obama and Speaker Nancy Pelosi.

== See also ==
- Art in the White House
- Military leadership in the American Civil War
- End of the Civil War 1864-1865
- Carolinas campaign
- Military art
