= William F. Cogswell =

American painter (1819–1903)

- Born: July 15, 1819; New York (state), U.S.
- Died: December 24, 1903 (aged 84); Pasadena, California, U.S.
- Resting place: Evergreen Cemetery, Los Angeles, California, U.S.
- Occupations: Visual artist, businessman
- Known for: Portraiture

Signature
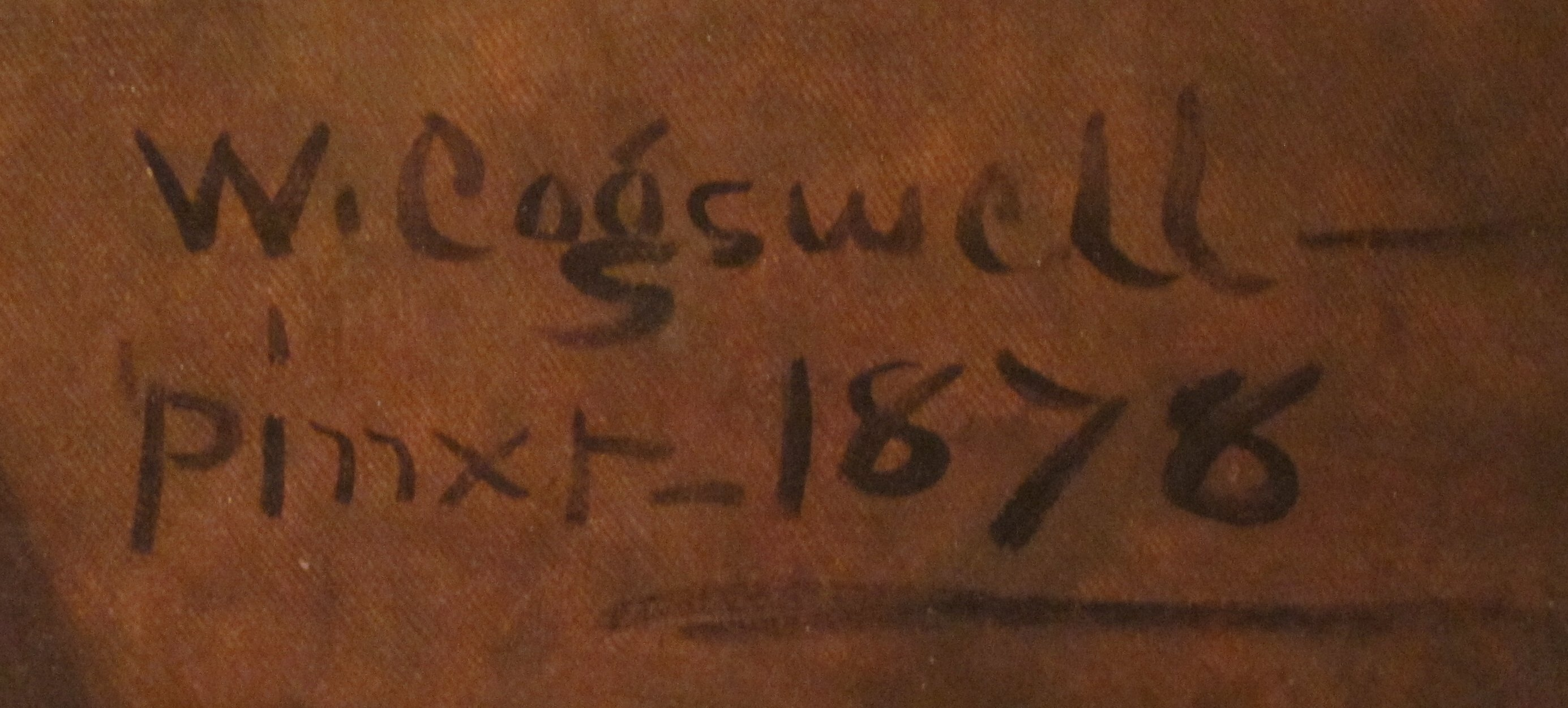

William F. Cogswell (July 15, 1819 – December 24, 1903) was an American portrait painter, and printmaker.

== Biography ==
Sources vary on William F. Cogswell's date of birth, either July 15, 1819 or July 19, 1819; and his place of birth which was either in Fabius, New York, or in Sandusky, New York. His gravestone uses the birth date of July 15, 1819. Cogswell was of English ancestry, with his relatives arriving to Massachusetts in 1635. In the 1830s, while working in a color factory in Buffalo, New York, he taught himself to paint.

During the 1840s, he worked in New York City as a professional portrait artist. Cogswell travelled to California in 1849, during the California Gold Rush in order to create sketches. Upon his return to New York City in November 1850 (via the Panama Isthmus), he turned his sketches of San Francisco into large scale panorama painting. The panorama was featured in newspapers and drew crowds.

In the early 1850s, Cogswell moved to Philadelphia for a few years; followed by a move to New York City from 1855 to 1857; and to St. Louis in 1859. His life sized oil painting portrait of artist Karl Ferdinand Wimar won first prize at the St. Louis Fair. In the 1860s, Cogswell lived in Chicago.

In 1871 he visited San Francisco again, and came back to live in 1873. He took several trips to the Sandwich Islands (now Hawaii) between 1878 and 1897. In 1880, Cogswell purchased the Sierra Madre Villa in Sierra Madre, California, a 500 acres (200 ha) resort and health spa.

He died in Pasadena, California, on December 24, 1903.

== Legacy ==
Cogswell is most noted for his portraits of Ulysses S. Grant, currently hanging in the United States Senate, and Abraham Lincoln, which hangs in the White House. He also painted Hawaiian royalty, including King Kalākaua, Princess Liliuokalani, Queen Emma, King Kamehameha IV, and King Kamehameha V—the latter two from photographs.

=== Collections ===
The Bishop Museum (Honolulu), the Butler Institute of American Art (Youngstown, Ohio), the Crocker Art Museum (Sacramento, California), the Joslyn Art Museum (Omaha, Nebraska), the National Portrait Gallery (Washington, DC), the New York Historical Society, the Ohio Historical Society (Columbus, Ohio), the Haggin Museum (Stockton, California), the Indiana State Museum (Indianapolis), the White House, the Union League Club of Chicago, and the Mabel Tainter Theater in Menomonie, Wisconsin, are among the public collections holding paintings by William Cogswell.

== Gallery ==
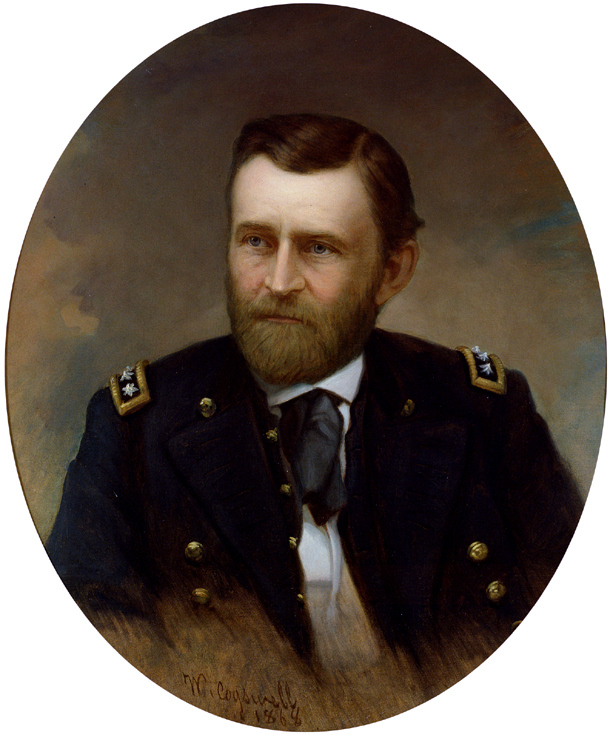
1868 - Ulysses S. Grant

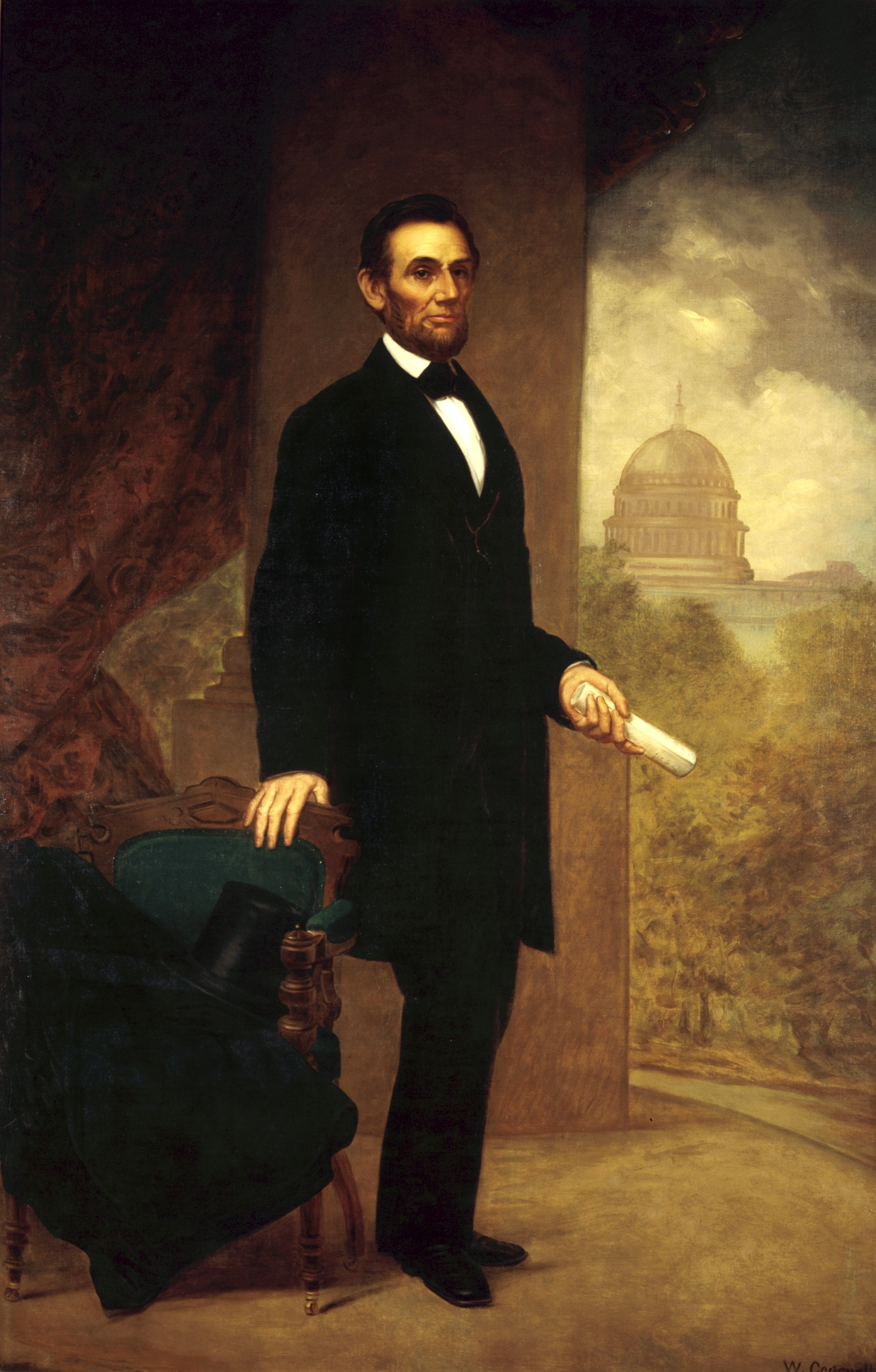
1869 - Abraham Lincoln
