= Portrait of William Tecumseh Sherman =

Painting by George Peter Alexander Healy

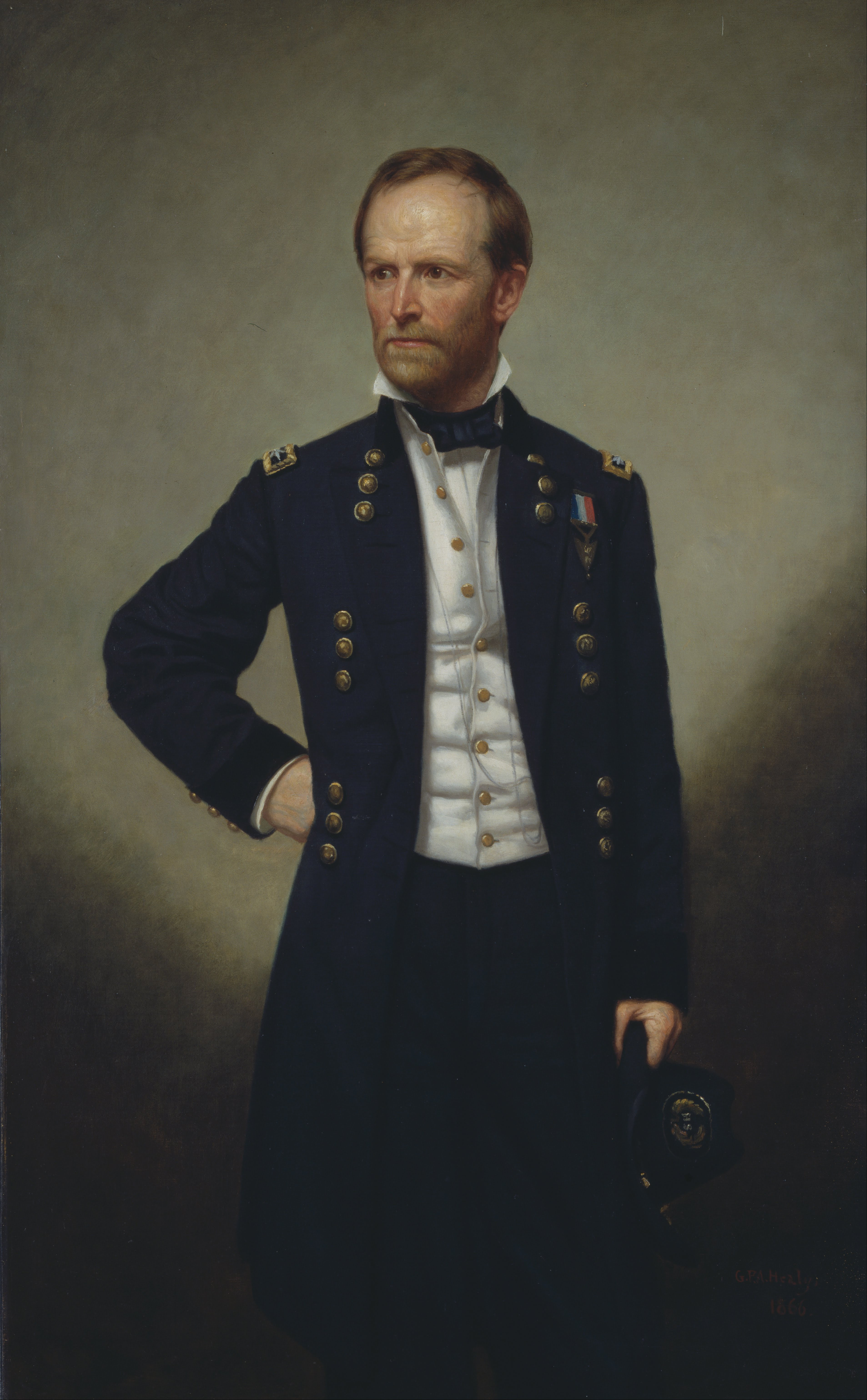
- Artist: George Healy
- Year: 1866
- Type: Oil on canvas, portrait painting
- Dimensions: 158.8 cm × 95.3 cm (62.51 in × 37.51 in)
- Location: National Portrait Gallery, Washington D.C.

Portrait of William Tecumseh Sherman is an 1866 portrait painting by the American artist George Peter Alexander Healy. It depicts the American general William Tecumseh Sherman. Sherman was best known for his service in the Union Army of the American Civil War, particularly his Capture of Atlanta and March to the Sea through Georgia in late 1864. From 1869 he was Commanding General of the United States Army.

The painting was displayed at the Royal Academy Exhibition of 1866 at the National Gallery in London. Today it is part of the collection of the National Portrait Gallery, part of the Smithsonian Institution, in Washington D.C. which acquired it in 1934.

== Bibliography ==
- Axelrod, Alan. Generals South, Generals North: The Commanders of the Civil War Reconsidered. Globe Pequot, 2011
- Christman, Margaret C. S. ''A Brush with History: Paintings from the National Portrait Gallery. The Gallery, 2001.
