= Portrait of Marshal Soult =

Painting by George Peter Alexander Healy

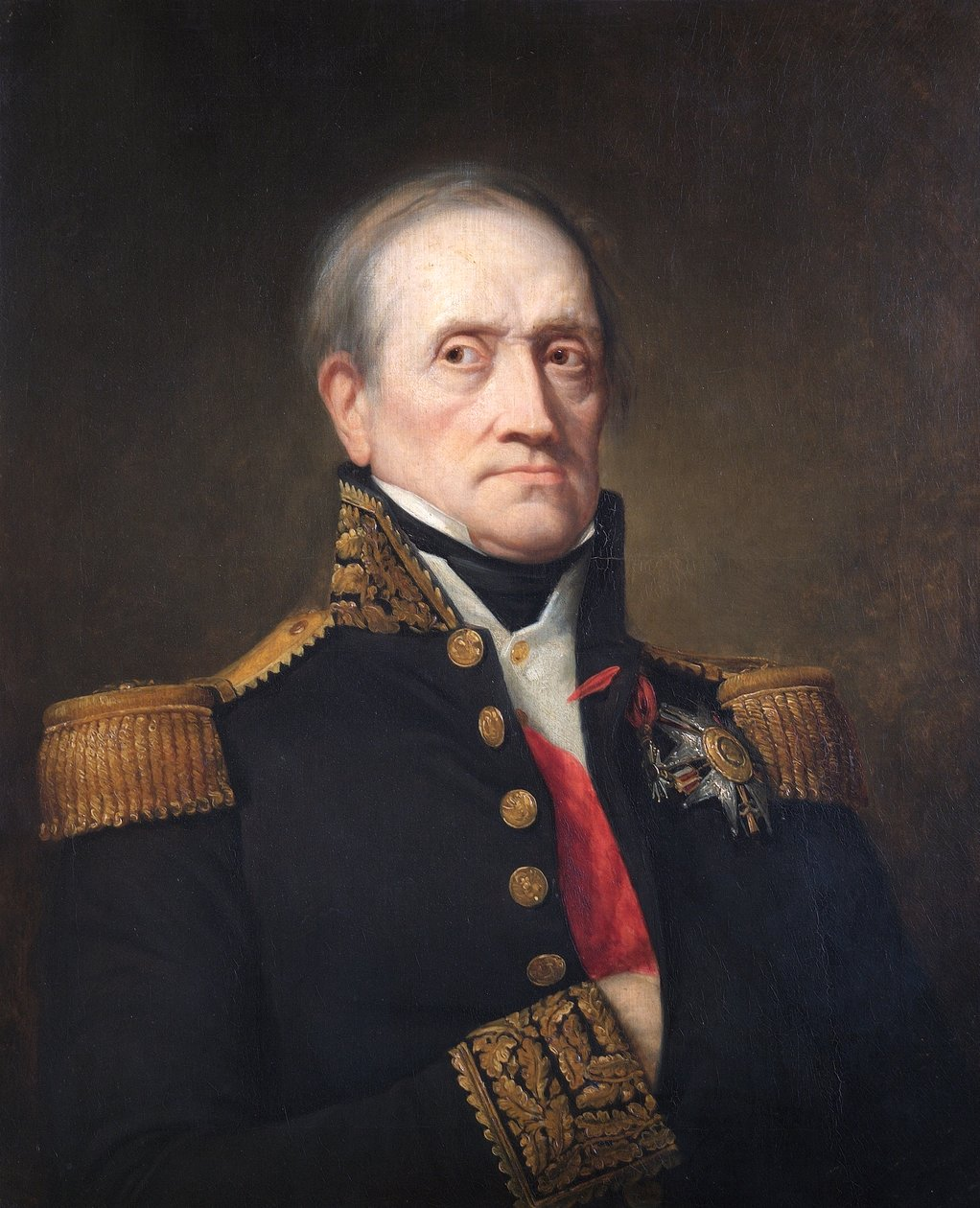
- Artist: George Healy
- Year: 1840
- Type: Oil on canvas, portrait painting
- Dimensions: 75 cm × 62 cm (30 in × 24 in)
- Location: Apsley House, London

Portrait of Marshal Soult is an 1840 portrait painting by the American artist George Healy. It depicts the French soldier and politician Jean-de-Dieu Soult.

Soult was one of the Marshals of the Empire under Napoleon. He served widely during the Napoleonic Wars including during the Peninsular War where he faced Allied forces under the Duke of Wellington on a number of occasions. He served as the Emperor's Chief of Staff at the Battle of Waterloo in 1815. Following the July Revolution of 1830 he came to political prominence during the reign of Louis Philippe I. He served as Ministry of War twice and Prime Minister of France on three occasions. His third term as from 1840 to 1847.

Soult is shown in the uniform of a Field Marshal wearing the decorations of the Legion of Honour. Painted when he was around the age of seventy, it was produced at the suggestion of Lewis Cass, the American ambassador in Paris. The painting was displayed at the Salon of 1840 at the Louvre in Paris where it was awarded a gold medal. It also featured at the Royal Academy Exhibition of 1840. Today the painting is at Apsley House, the Duke of Wellington's residence in London .

== Bibliography ==
- Buttery, David. Wellington Against Soult: The Second Invasion of Portugal, 1809. Pen & Sword Books, 2015.
- Jervis, Simon & Tomlin, Maurice. Apsley House, Wellington Museum. Victoria and Albert Museum, 1997.
- Price, Munro. The Perilous Crown: France Between Revolutions, 1814-1848. Pan Macmillan, 2010.
