= George Peter Alexander Healy =

American portrait painter (1813–1894)

- Photograph, c. 1855–1865
- Born: July 15, 1813; Boston, Massachusetts, U.S.
- Died: June 24, 1894 (aged 80); Chicago, Illinois, U.S.
- Known for: Painting
- Notable work: The Peacemakers; Abraham Lincoln

George Peter Alexander Healy (July 15, 1813 – June 24, 1894) was an American portrait painter. He was one of the most prolific and popular painters of his day, and his sitters included many of the eminent personages of his time. Born in Boston, he studied in America and Europe, and over his lifetime had studios in Paris and Chicago.

== Biography ==
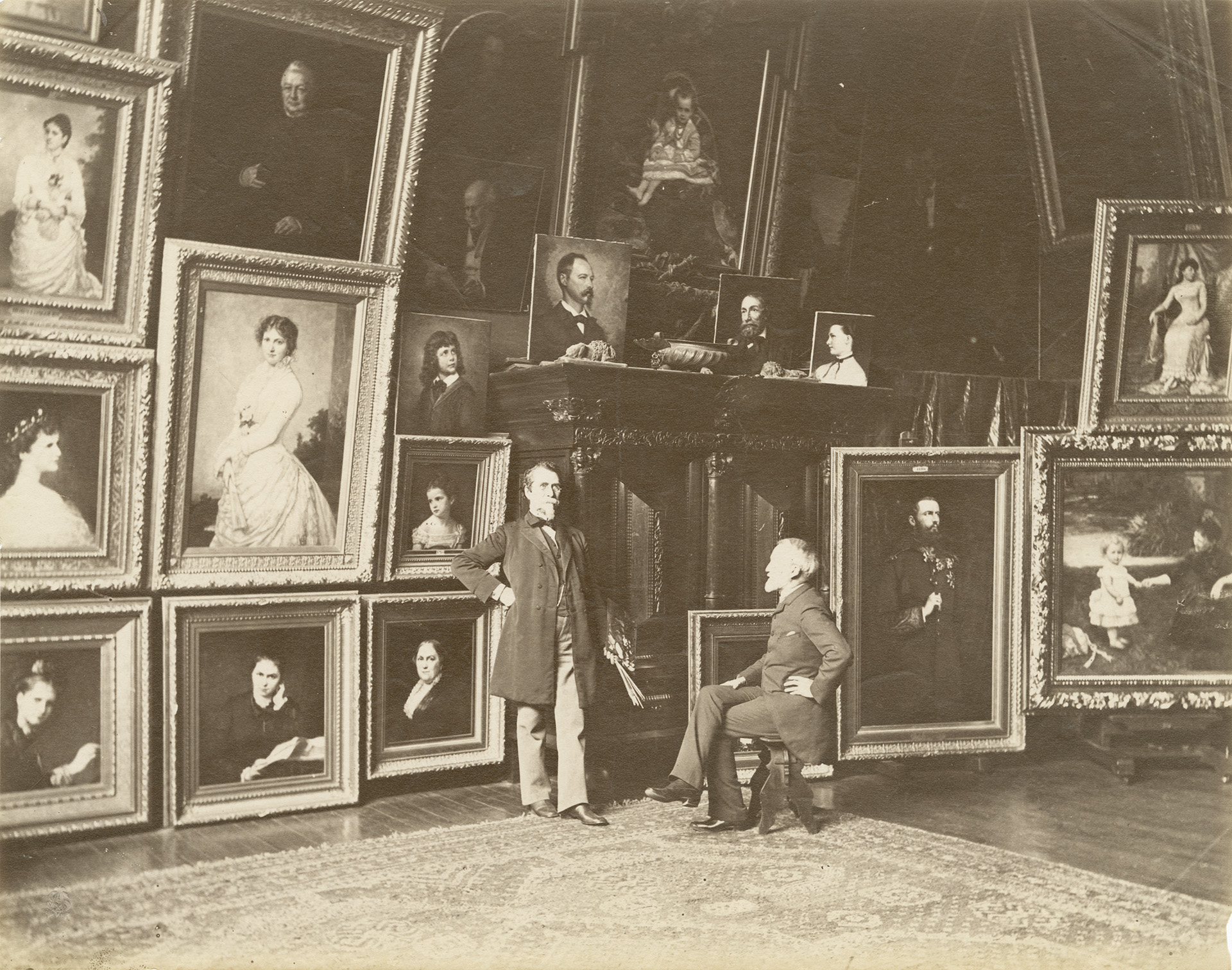
George Peter Alexander Healy in his Paris studio, c. 1884–1894, albumen print by Edmond Bénard, Department of Image Collections, National Gallery of Art Library, Washington, DC

Healy was born in Boston, Massachusetts. He was the eldest of five children of an Irish captain in the merchant marine.

Having been left fatherless at a young age, Healy helped to support his mother. At sixteen years of age he began drawing, and developed an ambition to be an artist. Jane Stuart, daughter of Gilbert Stuart, aided him, loaning him a Guido's "Ecce Homo", which he copied in color and sold to a country priest. Later, she introduced him to Thomas Sully, by whose advice Healy profited, and gratefully repaid Sully in the days of the latter's adversity.

At eighteen, Healy began painting portraits, and was soon very successful. In 1834, he went to Europe, leaving his mother well provided for, and remained abroad sixteen years during which he studied with Antoine-Jean Gros in Paris and in Rome, came under the influence of Thomas Couture, and painted assiduously. He received a third-class medal in the Paris Salon of 1840. In 1843 he was elected into the National Academy of Design as an Honorary Academician. He won a second-class medal in Paris in 1855, when he exhibited his Franklin Urging the Claims of the American Colonies Before Louis XVI.

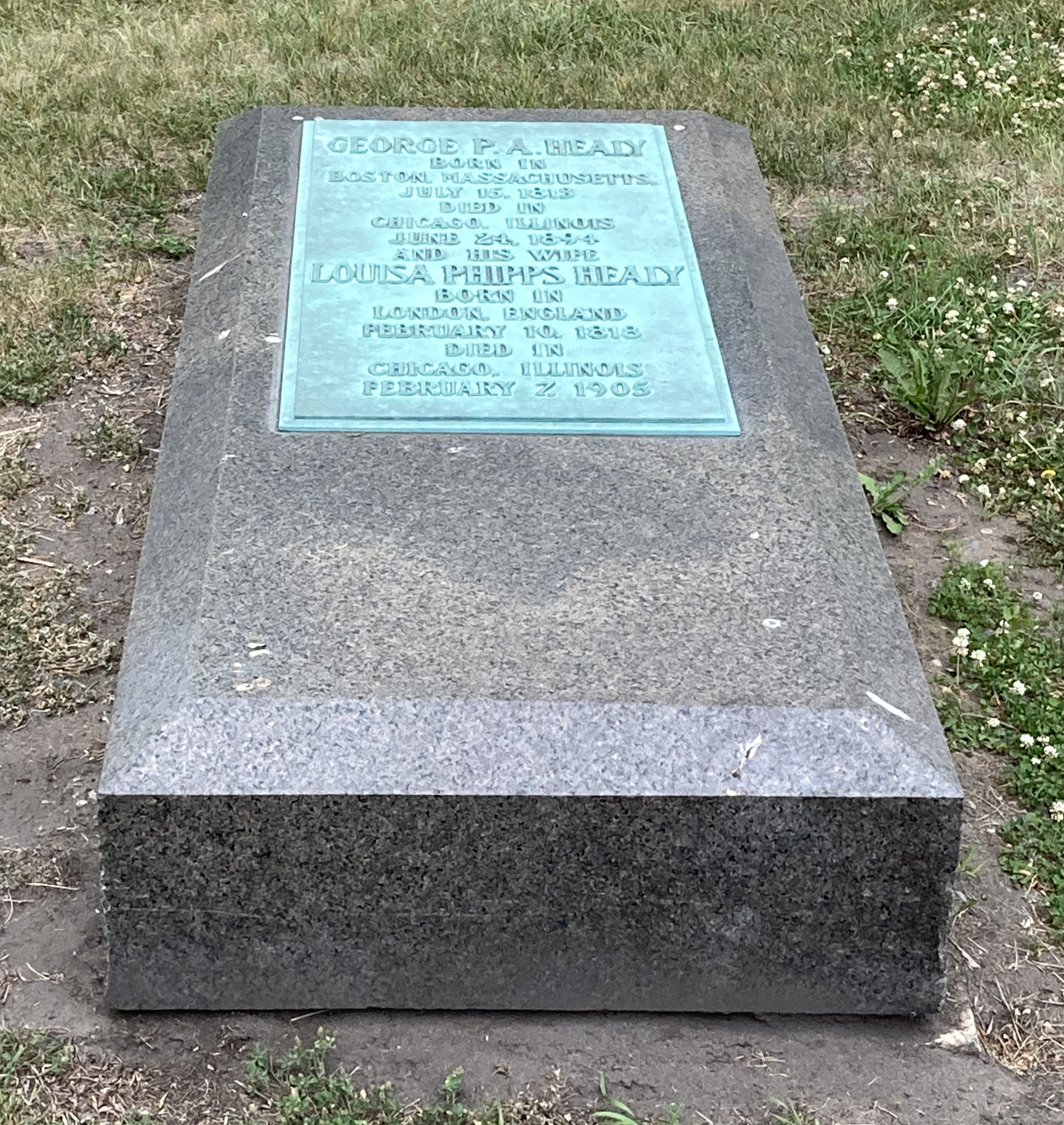
Healy's grave at Calvary Cemetery, Evanston, Illinois

In 1855, he returned to the United States, establishing his home and studio in Chicago, Illinois, where he remained based for the next 14 years until 1869. In 1857, he purchased a cottage in Cottage Hill, Illinois (today's Elmhurst) from Thomas Barbour Bryan, adjacent to Bryan's own Byrd's Nest estate. Healy would live in this cottage for the next six years. Bryan would be a significant patron of Healy's art. Healy also partnered with Bryan, as well as William Butler Ogden, Sidney Sawyer, and Edwin H Sheldon, in founding Graceland Cemetery. During the time his studio was based in Chicago, he also traveled in the United States to complete commissions.

Healy went back to Europe in 1869, painting steadily, chiefly in Rome and Paris, for twenty-one years. In 1892, he returned to live near family in Chicago, where he died on June 24, 1894. He was buried at Calvary Cemetery in Evanston.

Healy's autobiography, Reminiscences of a Portrait Painter, was published in 1894.

== Works ==
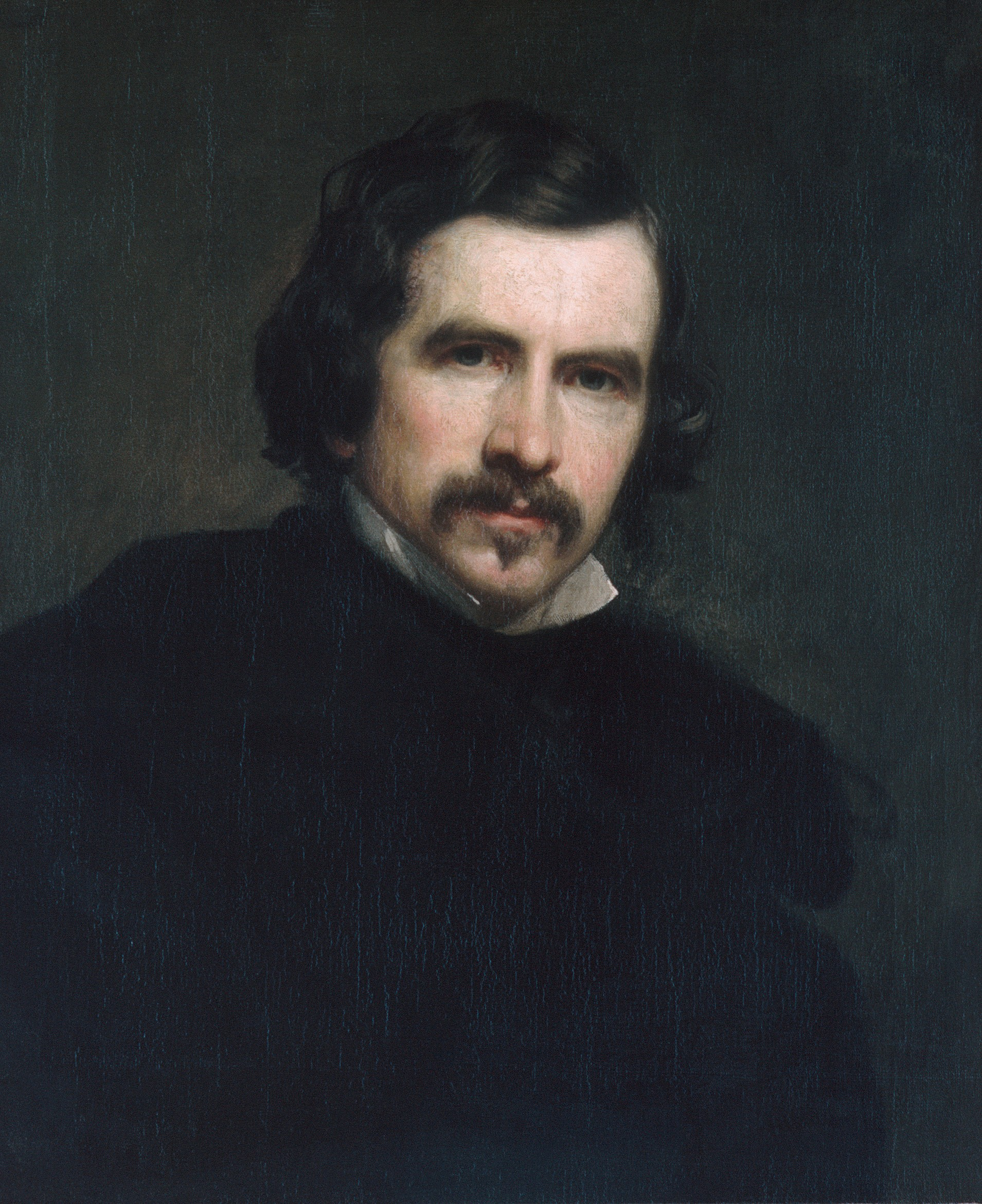
Portrait of the Artist (1851)

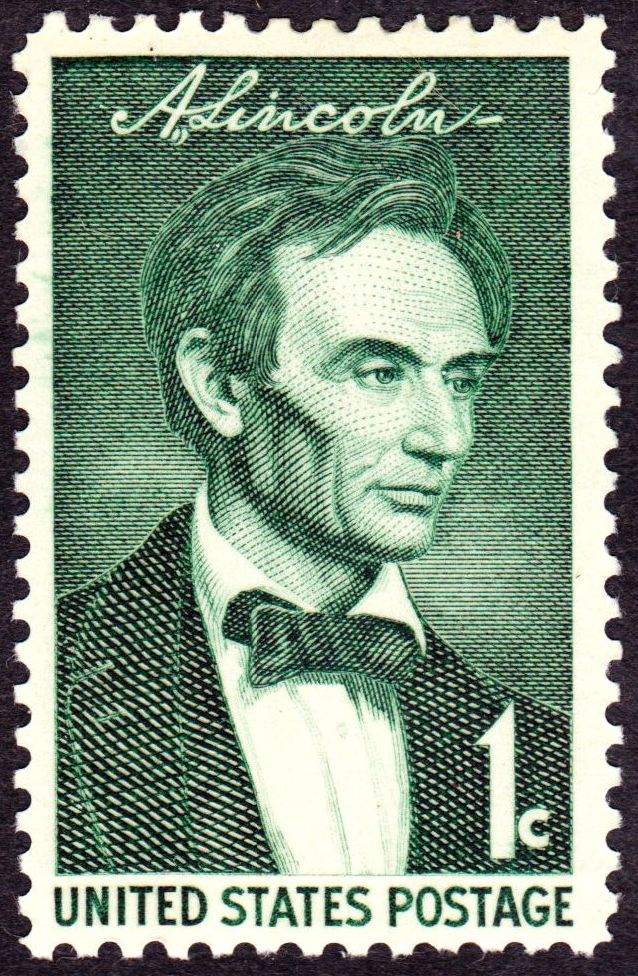
The Young Abe Lincoln by Healy Issue of 1959

Healy was a recognized painter of his day. "All my days are spent in my painting room" (Reminiscences).

Among his portraits of eminent persons are those of Daniel Webster, Henry Clay, John C. Calhoun, Pope Pius IX, Arnold Henry Guyot, William H. Seward, King Louis Philippe I, Marshal Soult, Hawthorne, Prescott, Longfellow, Franz Liszt, Gambetta, Thiers, Lord Lyons, Sallie Ward and the Princess (later the queen) of Romania. He painted portraits of all the presidents of the United States from John Quincy Adams to Ulysses S. Grant—this series being painted for the Corcoran Gallery, Washington, D.C. Healy also painted The Peacemakers in 1868 and Abraham Lincoln in 1869. In one large historical work, Webster's Reply to Hayne (1851; in Faneuil Hall, Boston), there are one hundred and thirty portraits.

His principal works include portraits of Lincoln (Corcoran Gallery), Bishop (later Cardinal) McClosky (bishop's residence, Albany), Guizot (1841, in Smithsonian Institution), Audubon (1838, Boston Soc. Nat. Hist.), Comte de Paris (Met. Mus. Of Art, New York), Isaac Thomas Hecker C.S.P., Founder of the Paulist Fathers (North American Paulist Center, Washington, D.C.)

The Newberry Library in Chicago holds 41 of Healy's paintings, donated by the artist in 1887. Most of the works can be found on display throughout the building. The Newberry also holds some letters by Healy, as well as information about the paintings.

Healy's 1877 portrait of a young Lincoln was the model used for a Lincoln postage stamp at the suggestion of Katherine McCook Knox and was issued on February 12, 1959, the 150th anniversary of Lincoln's birth.

== Gallery ==
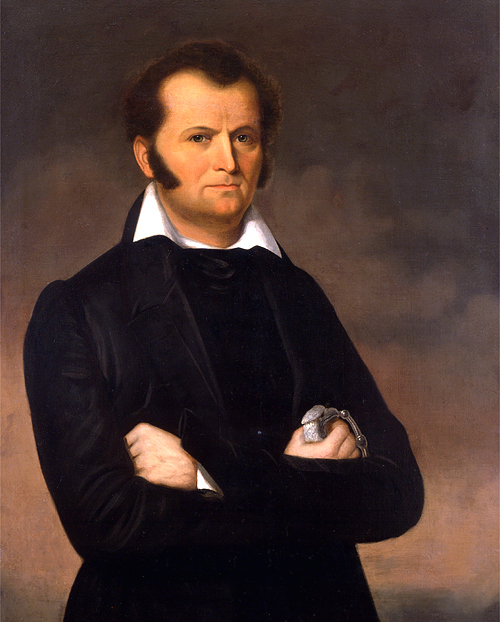
Jim Bowie, c. 1832

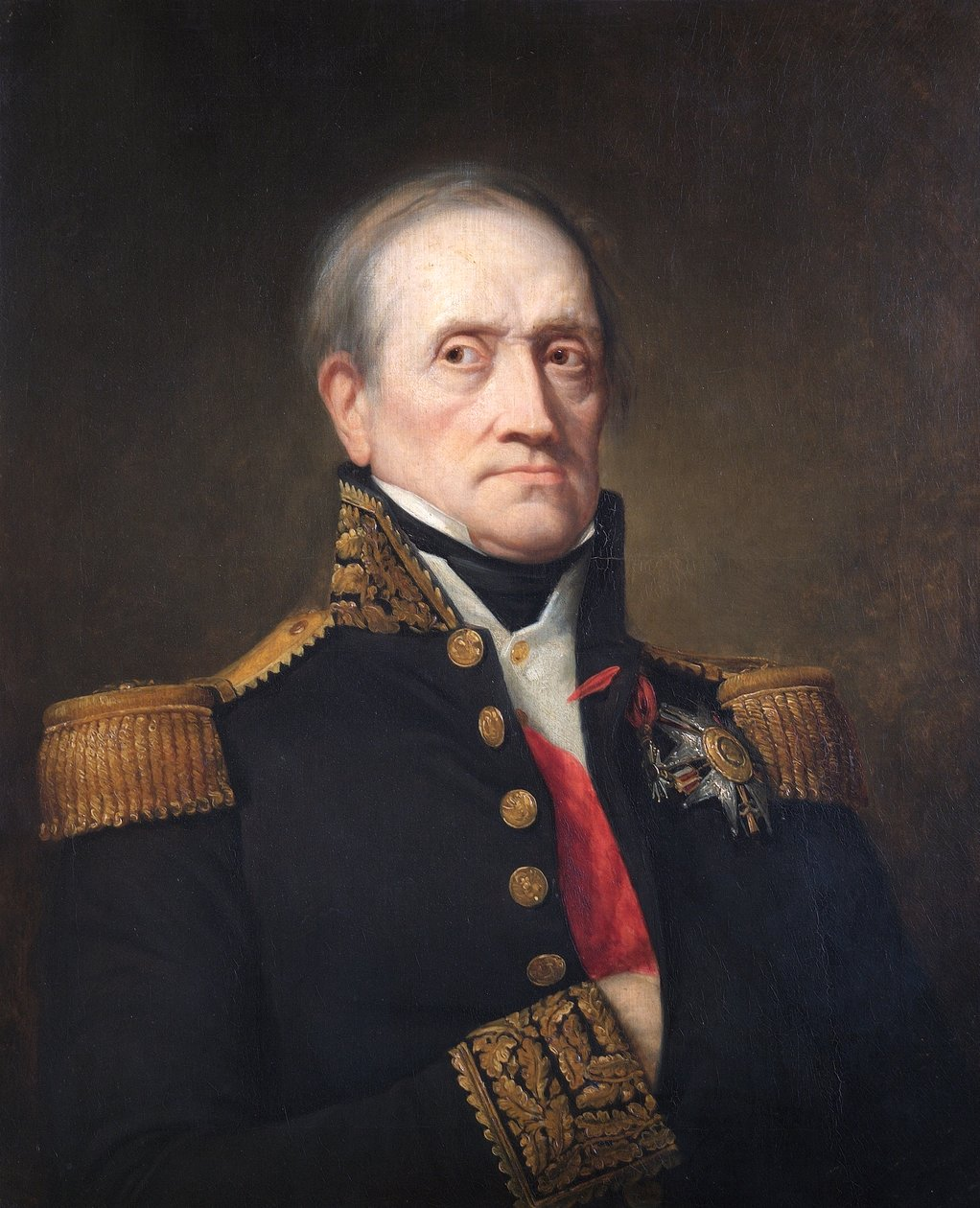
Portrait of Marshal Soult, 1840

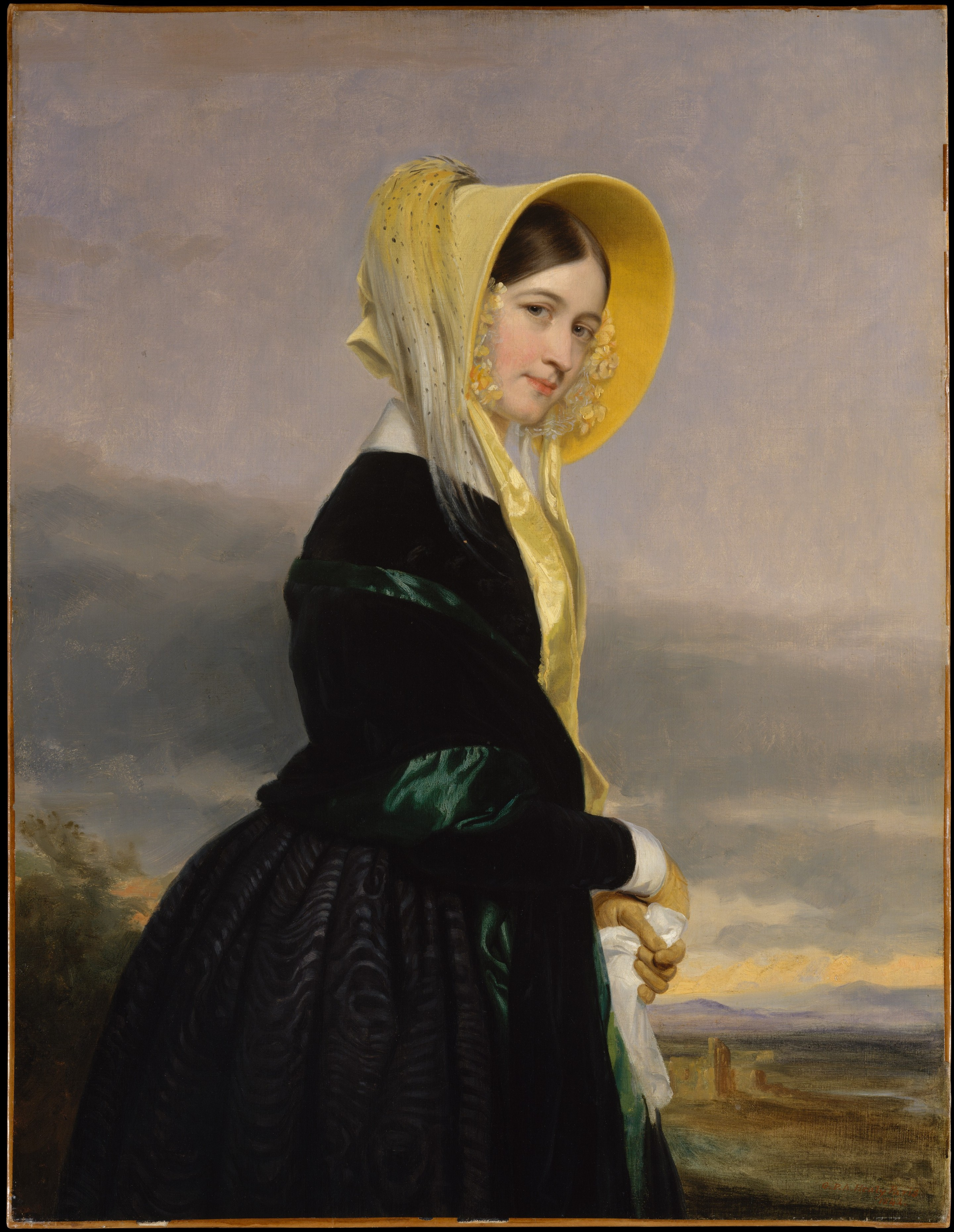
Euphemia White Van Rensselaer, 1842

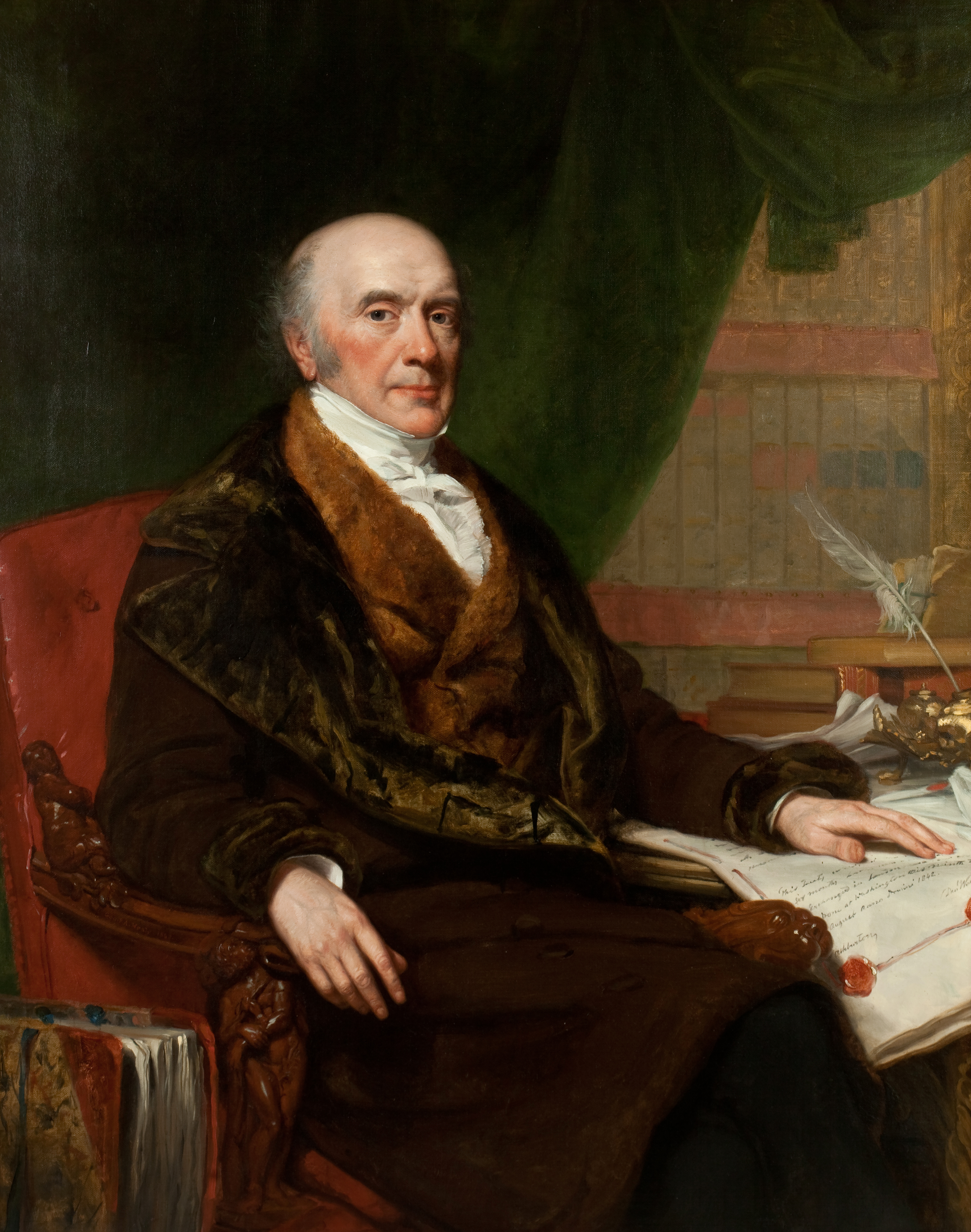
Alexander Baring, 1st Baron Ashburton, 1842

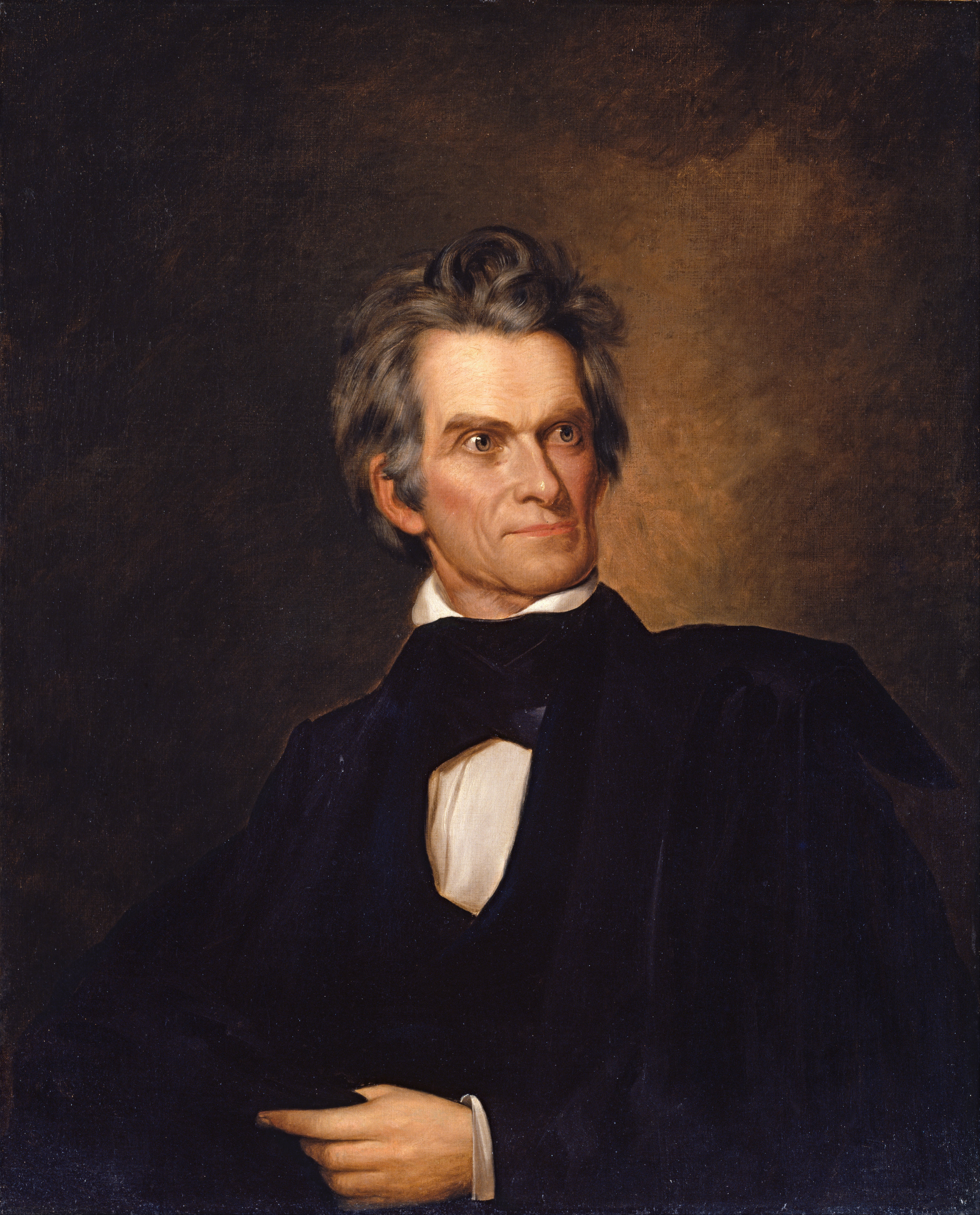
John C. Calhoun, c. 1845

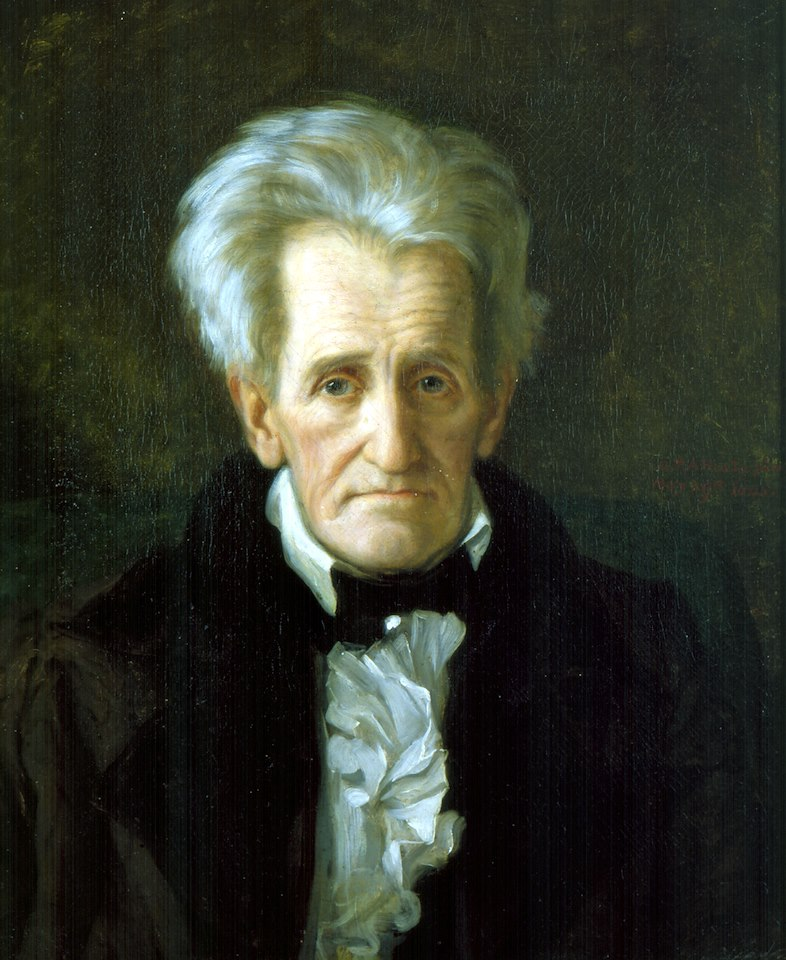
Andrew Jackson, 1845

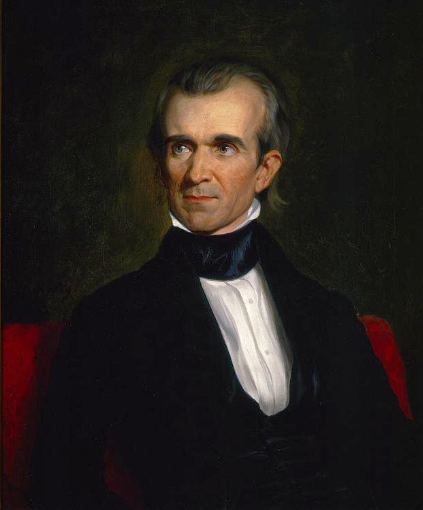
James Knox Polk, 1846

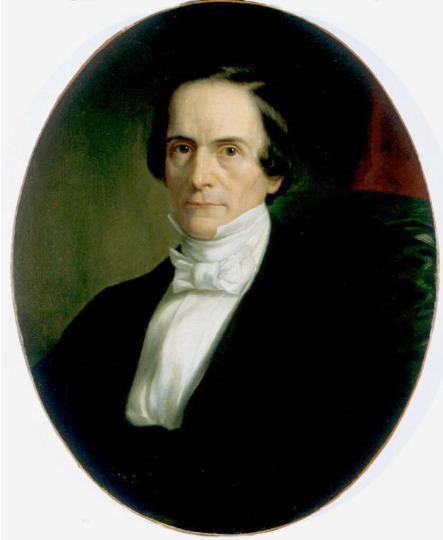
Henry Wheaton, c. 1847

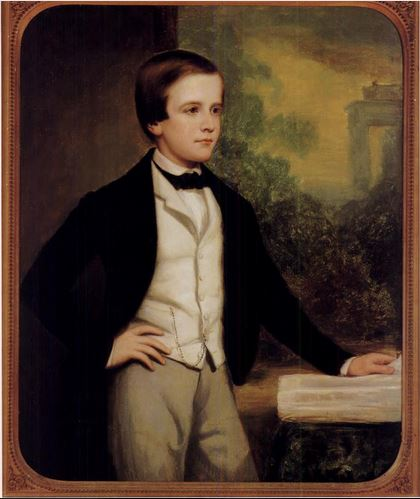
Richard Washington Corbin, 1850

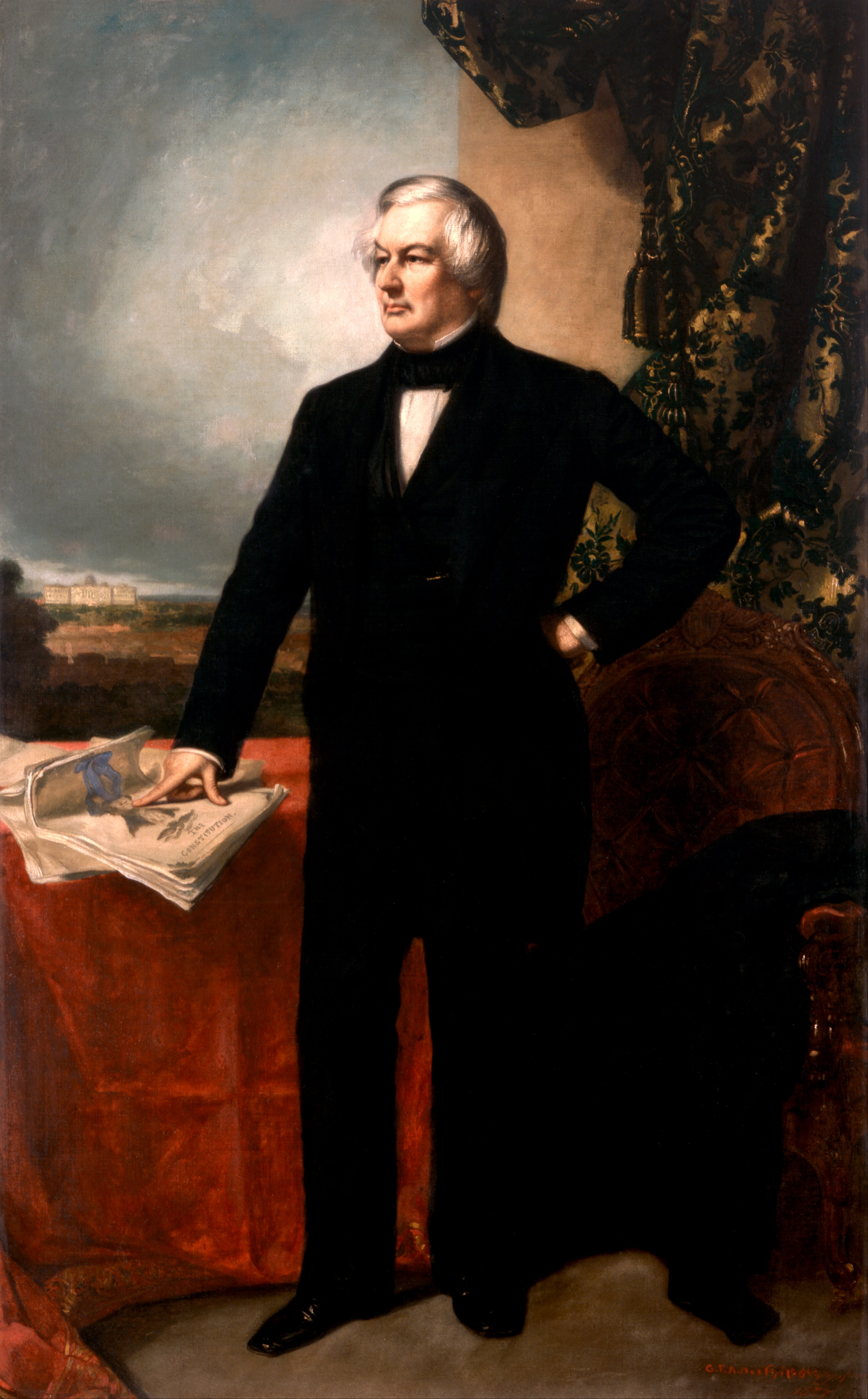
Millard Fillmore, 1857

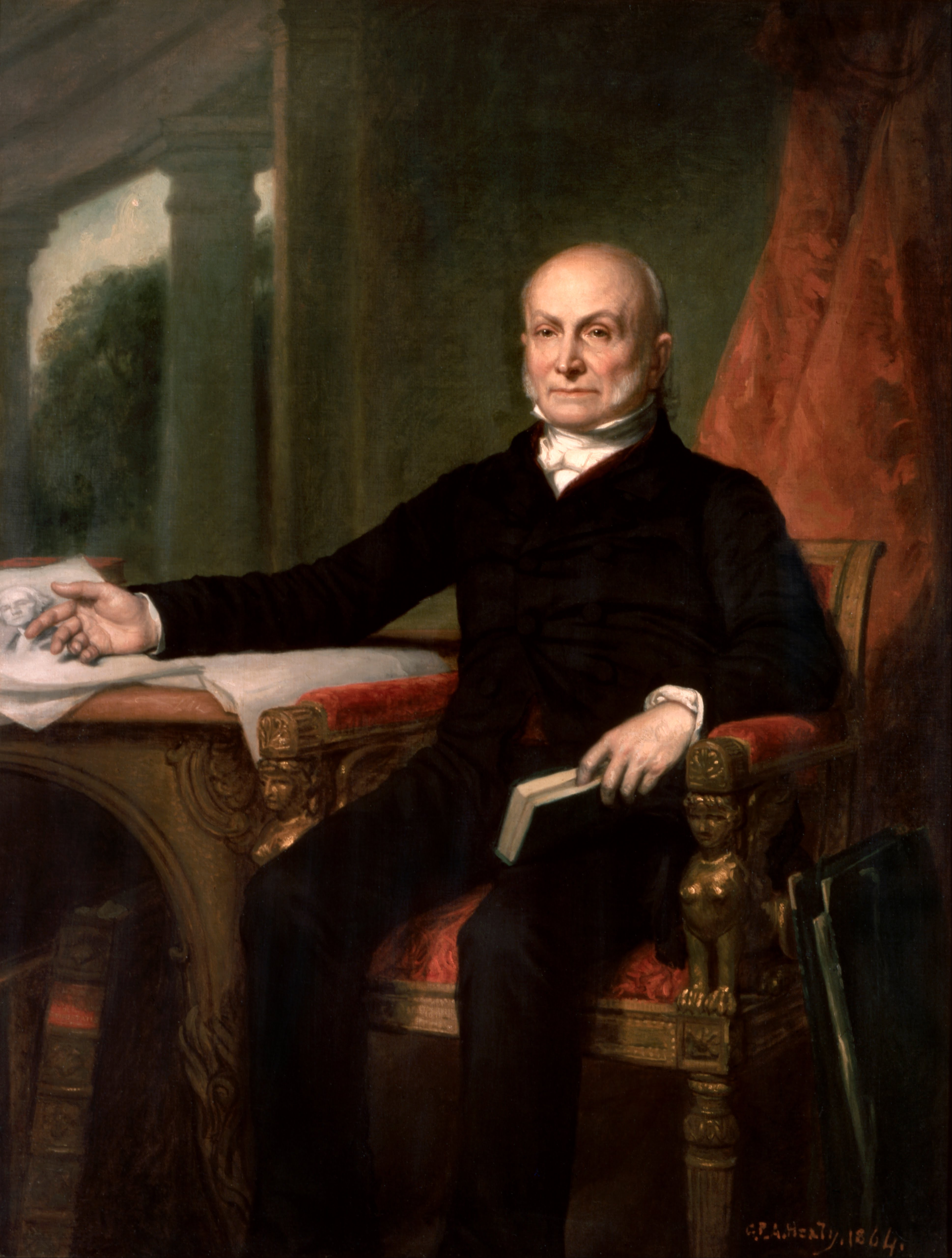
John Quincy Adams, 1858

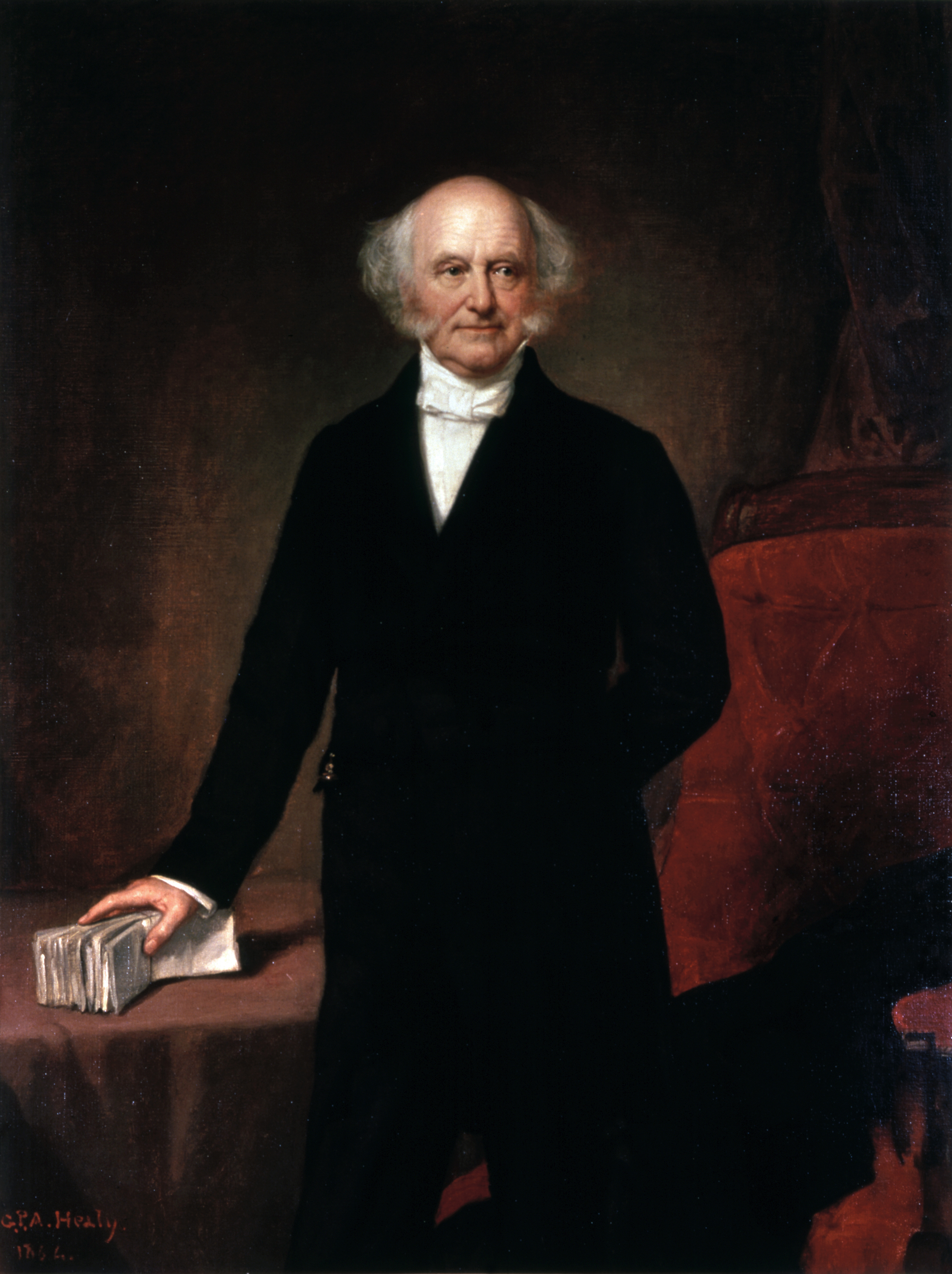
Martin Van Buren, 1858

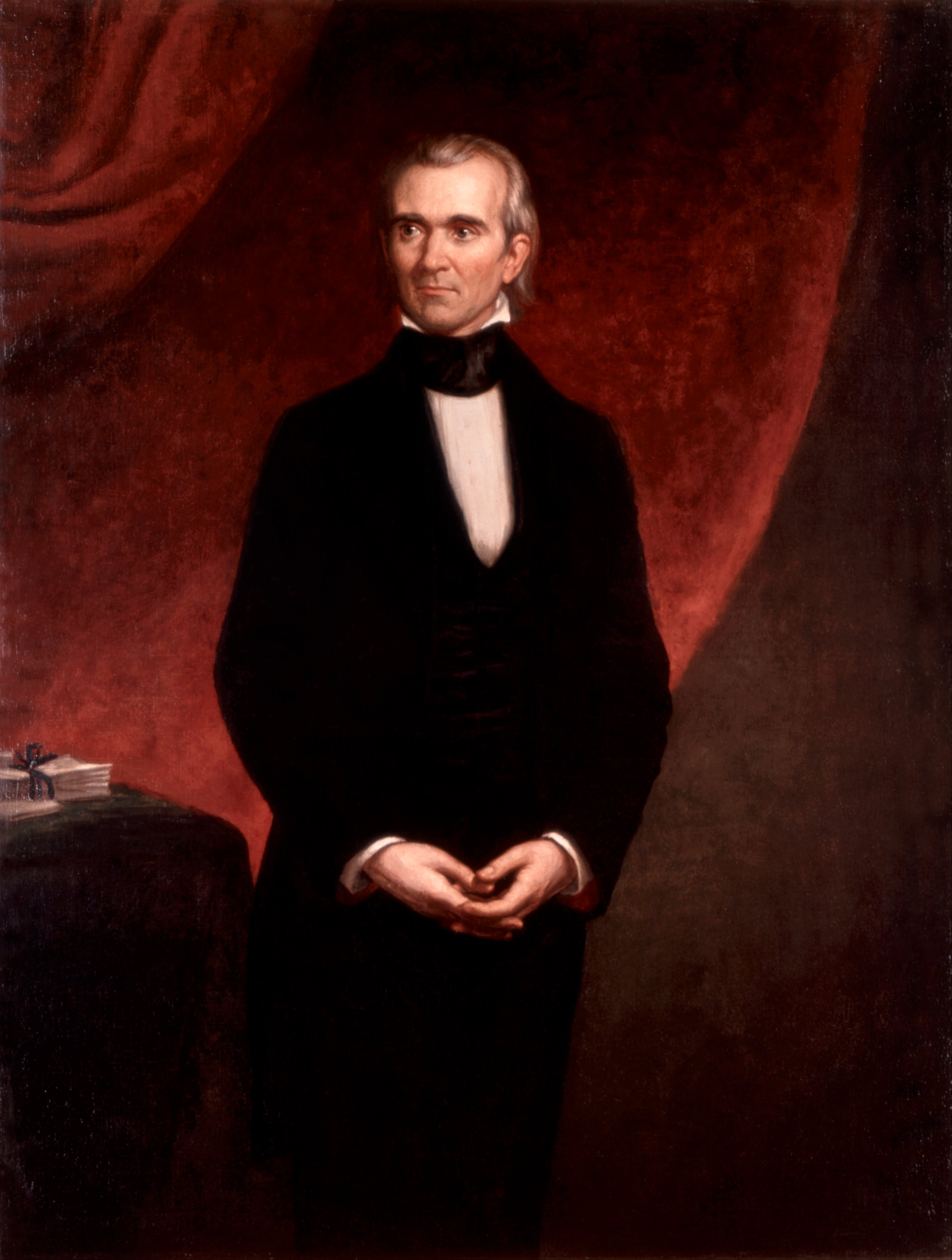
James Knox Polk, 1858

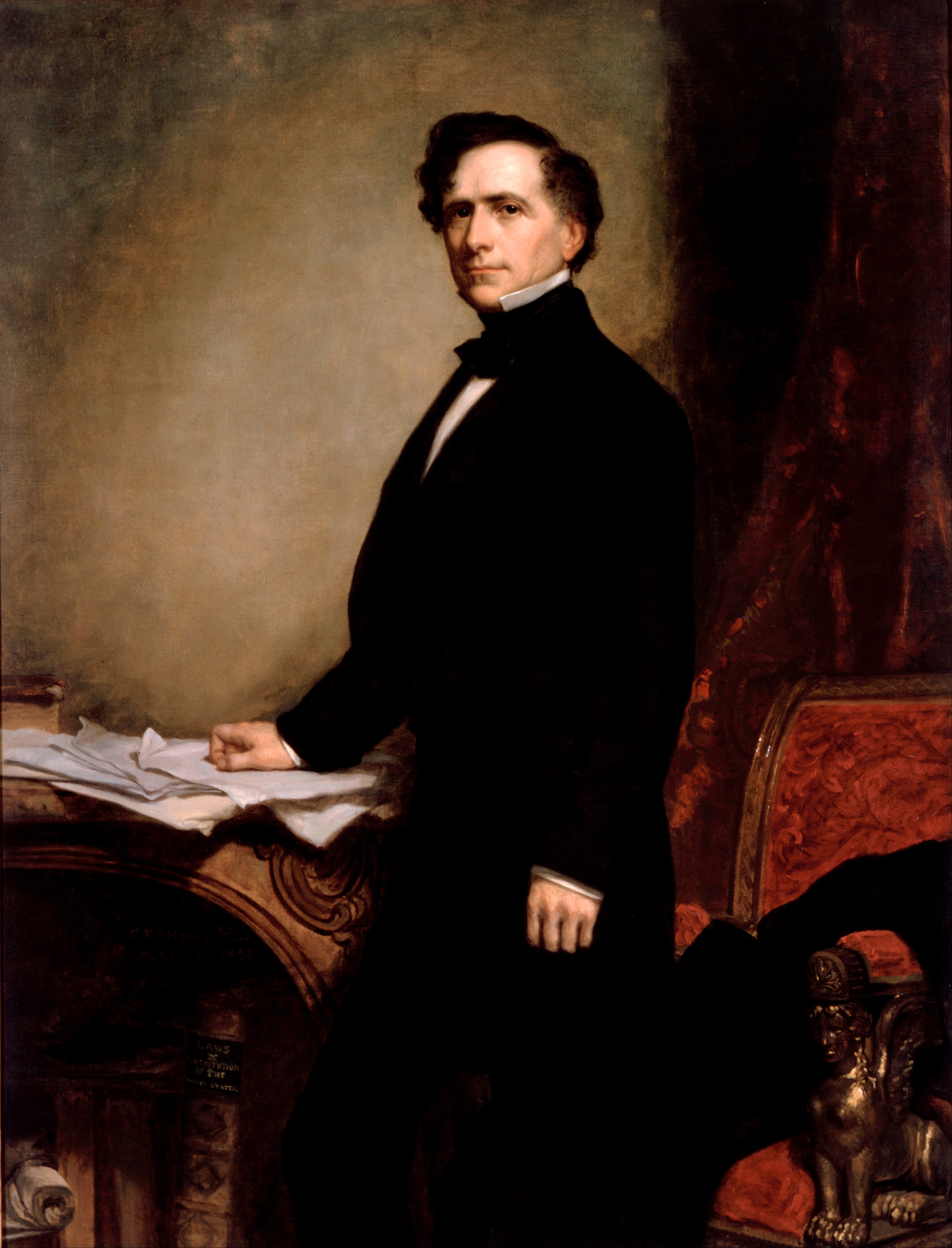
Franklin Pierce, 1858

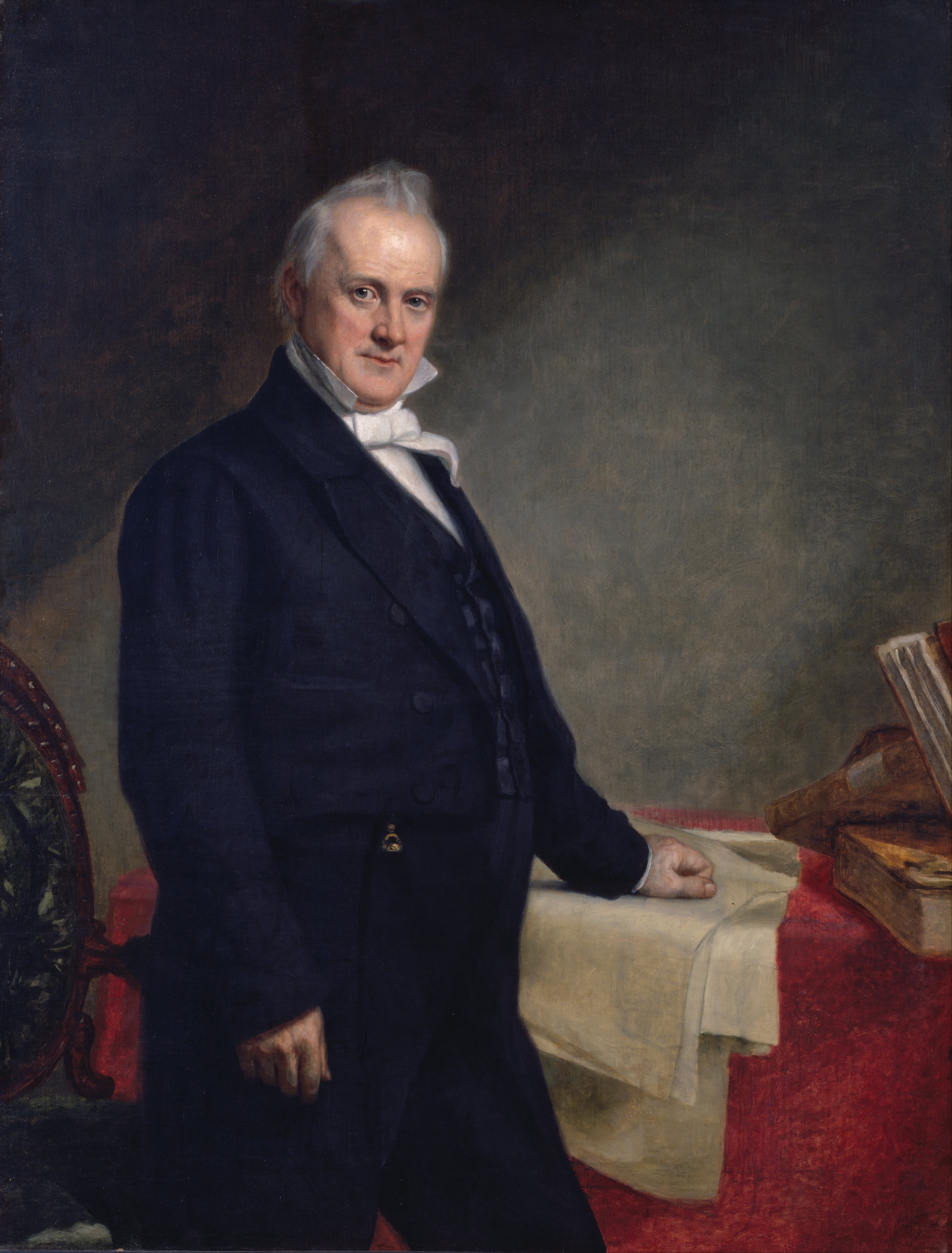
James Buchanan, 1859

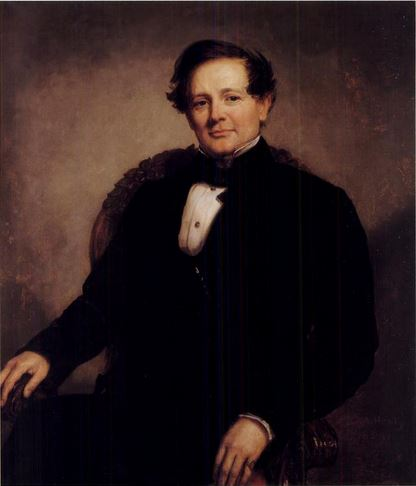
Dr. William Grosvenor, 1859

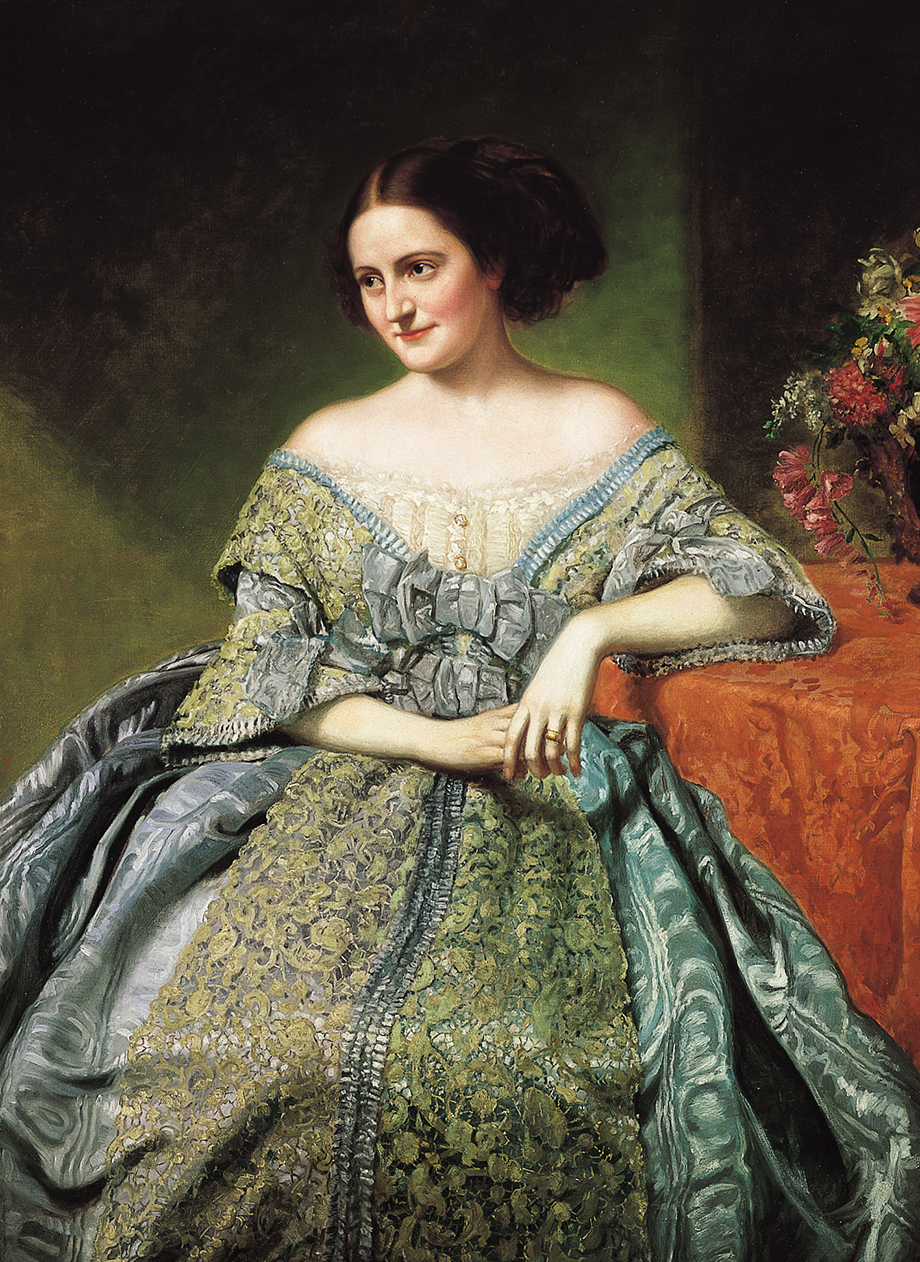
Sallie Ward, 1860

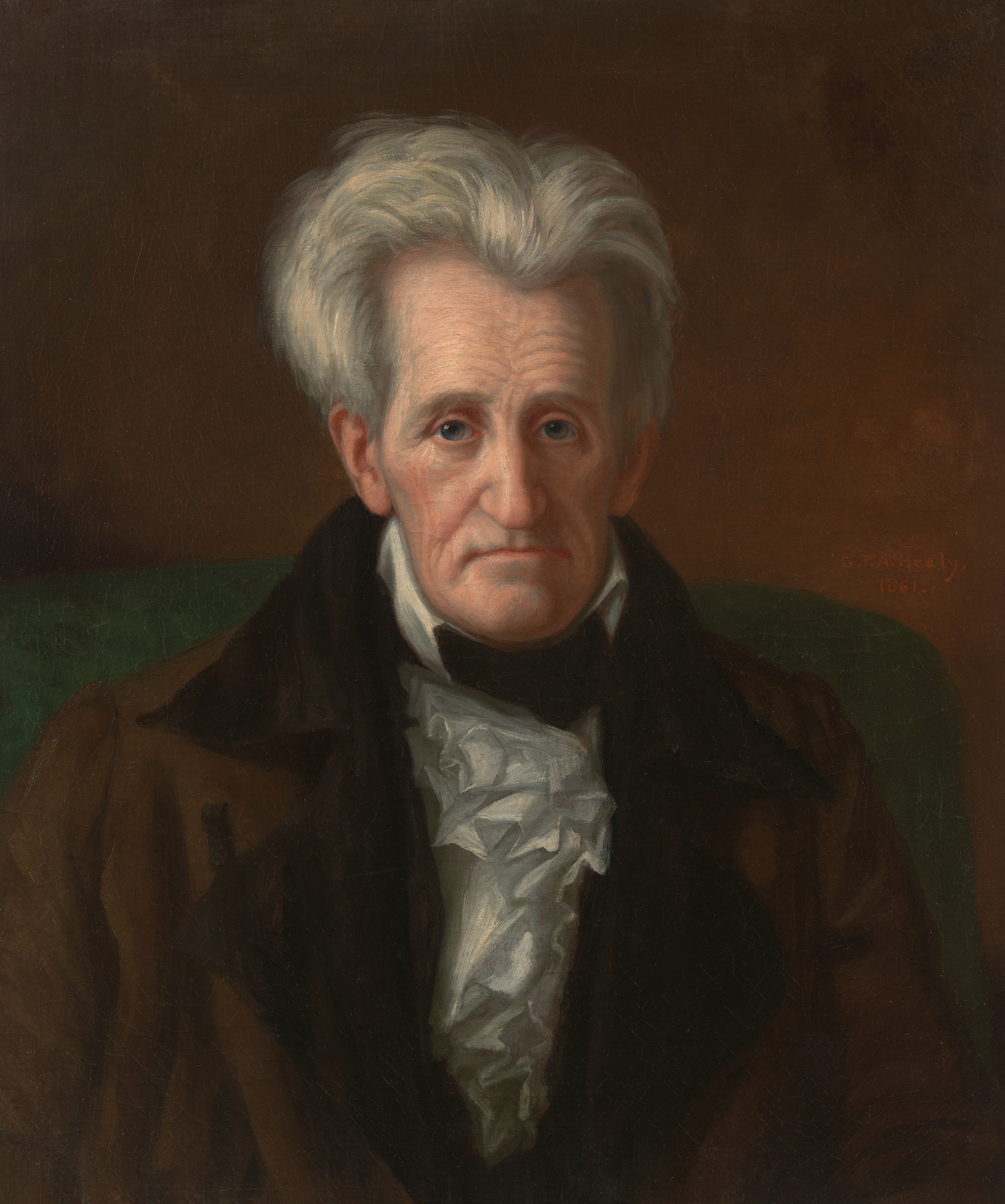
Andrew Jackson, 1861 (after 1845 original)

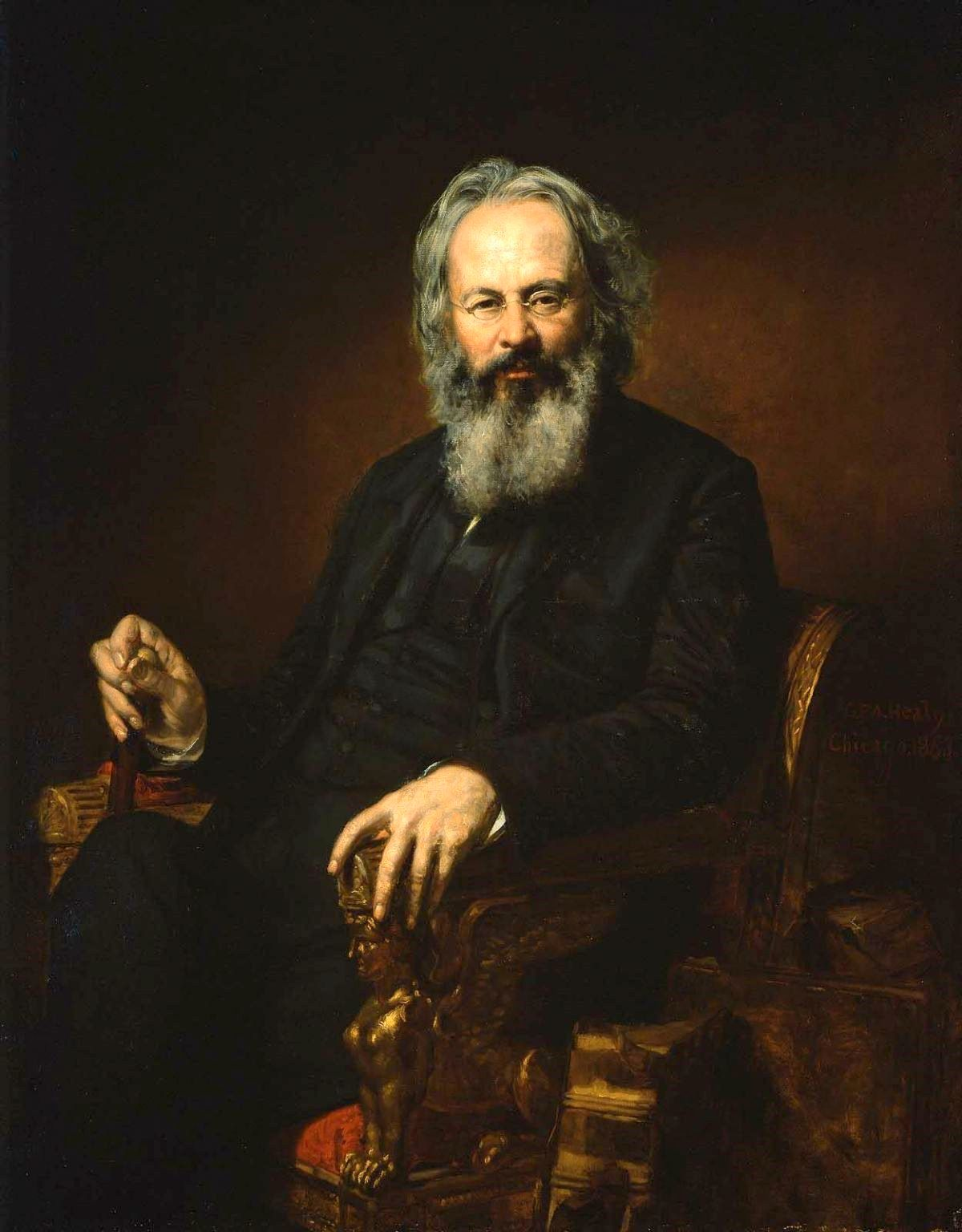
Orestes A. Brownson, 1863

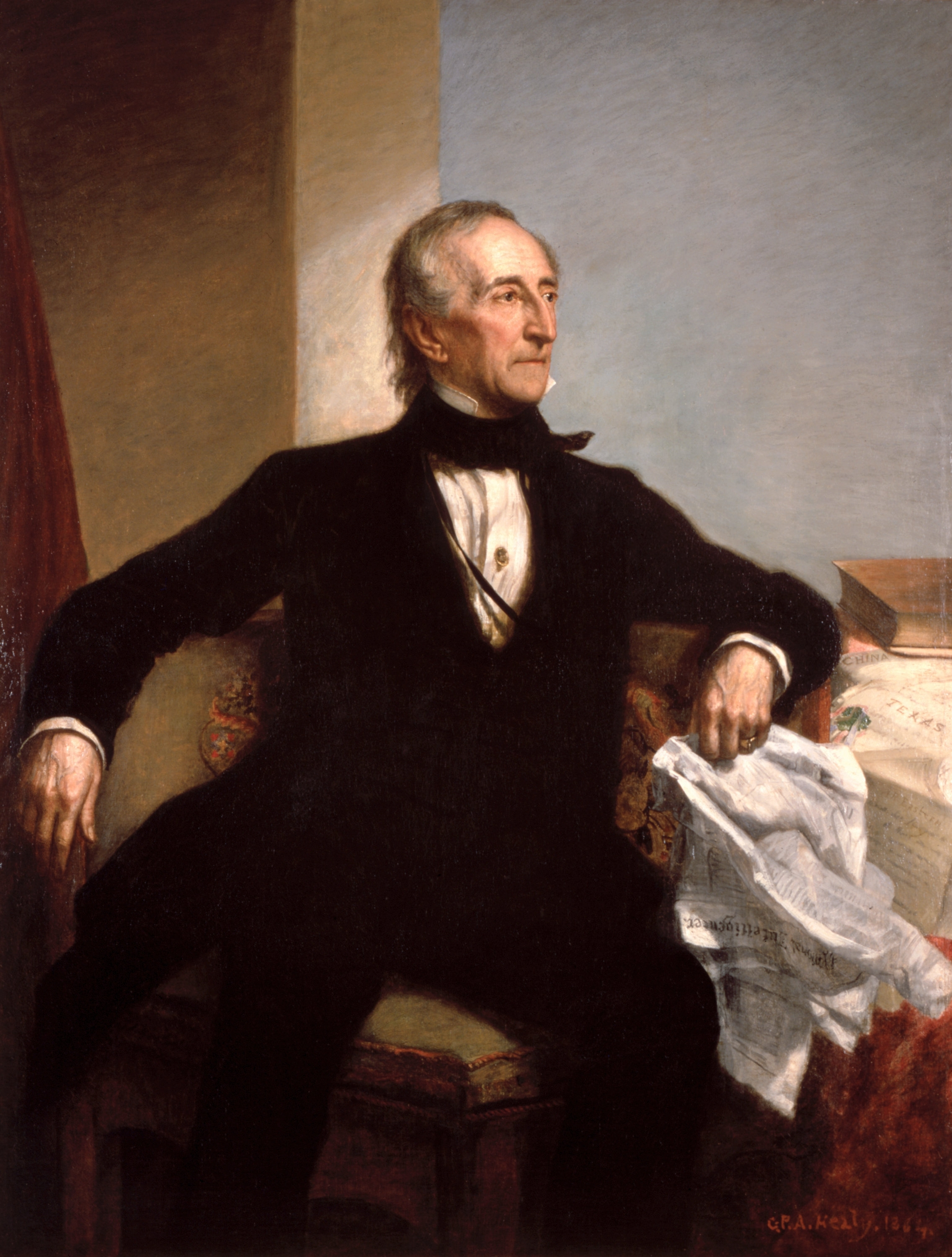
John Tyler, 1864

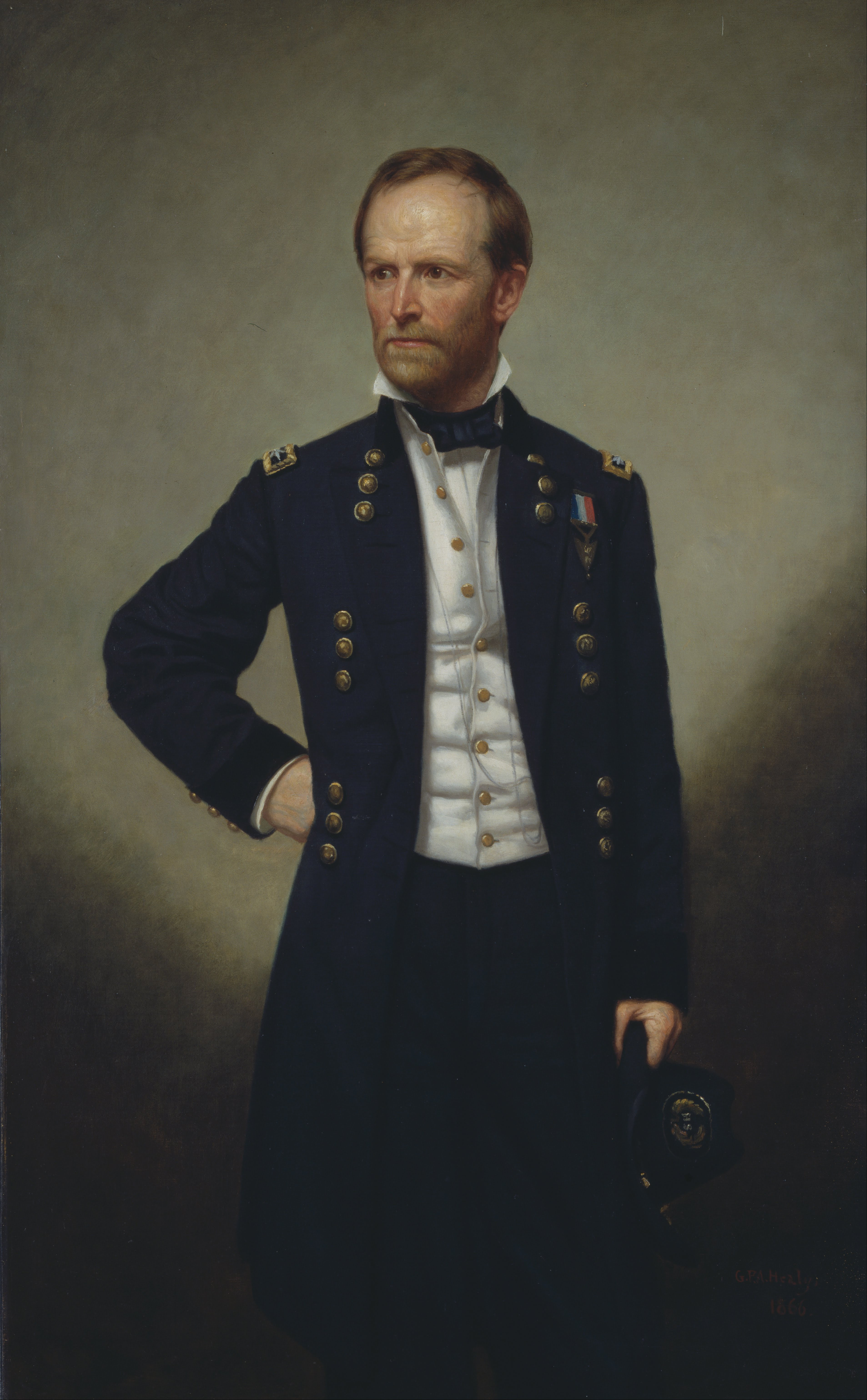
Portrait of William Tecumseh Sherman, 1866

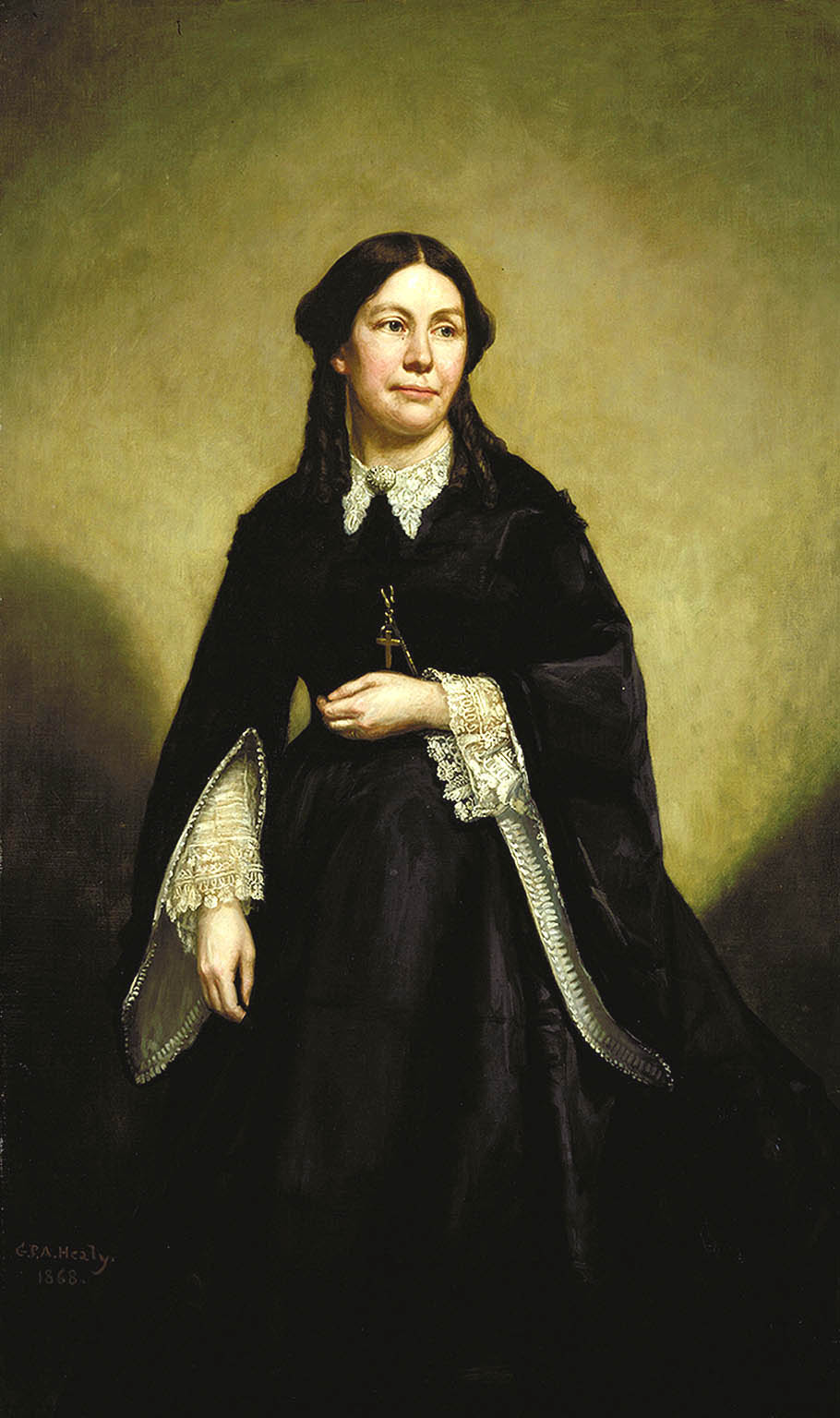
Eleanor Boyle Ewing Sherman, 1868

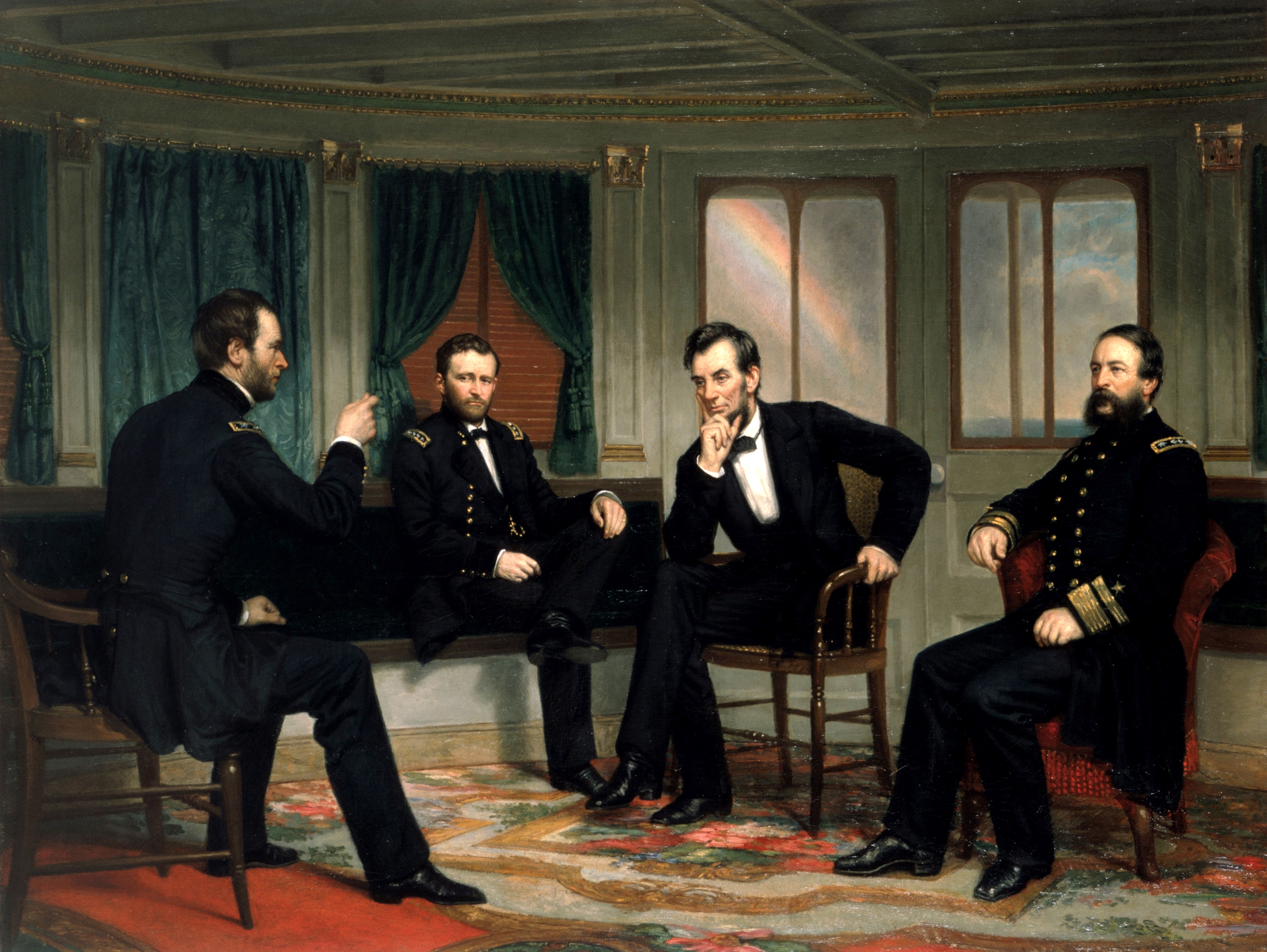
The Peacemakers, 1868

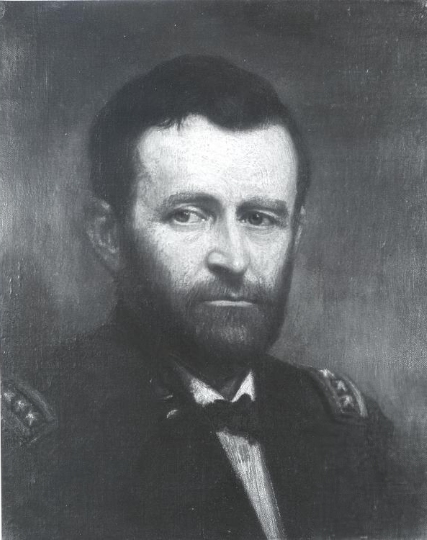
Ulysses Simpson Grant, 1868

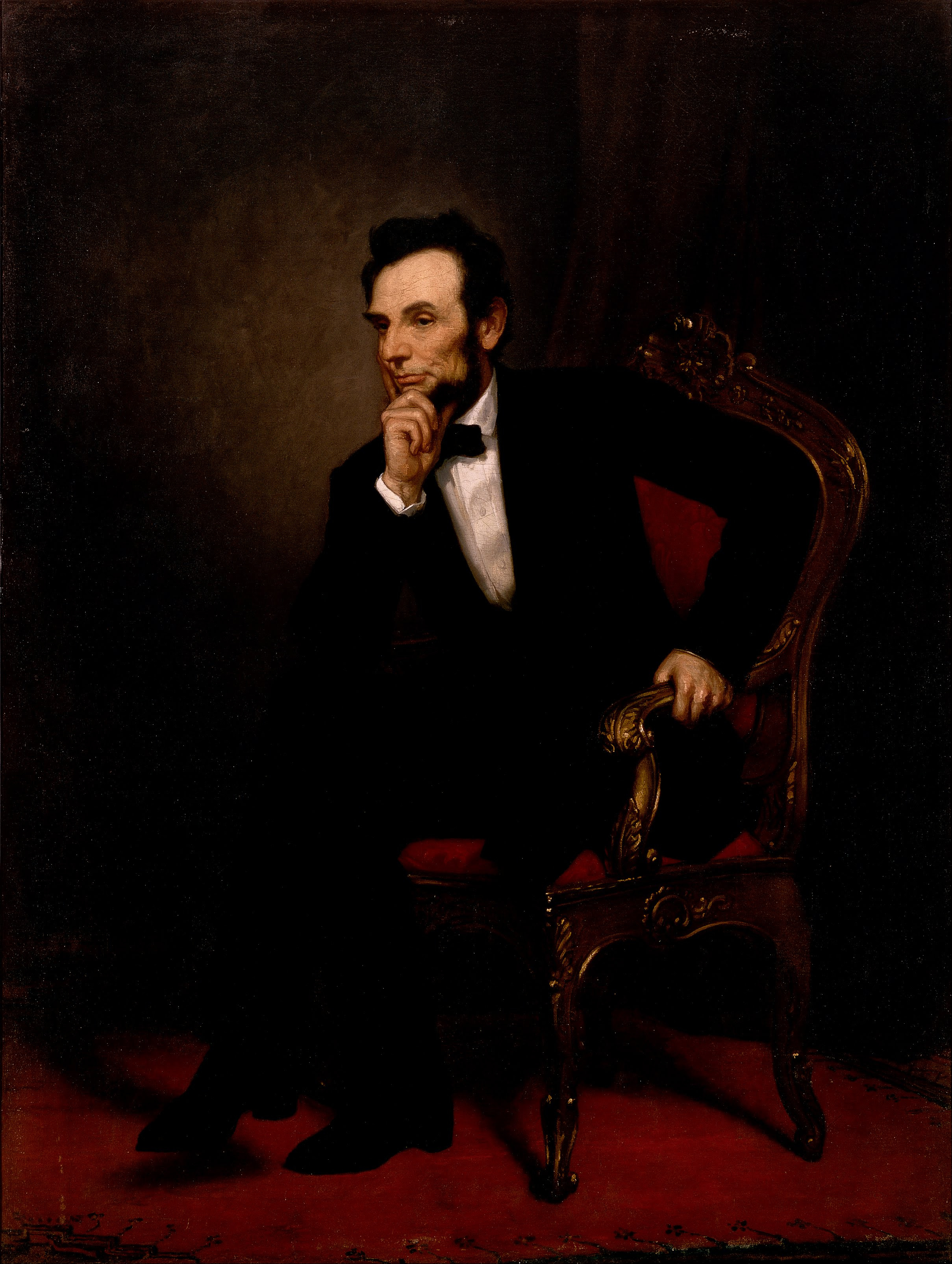
Abraham Lincoln, 1869

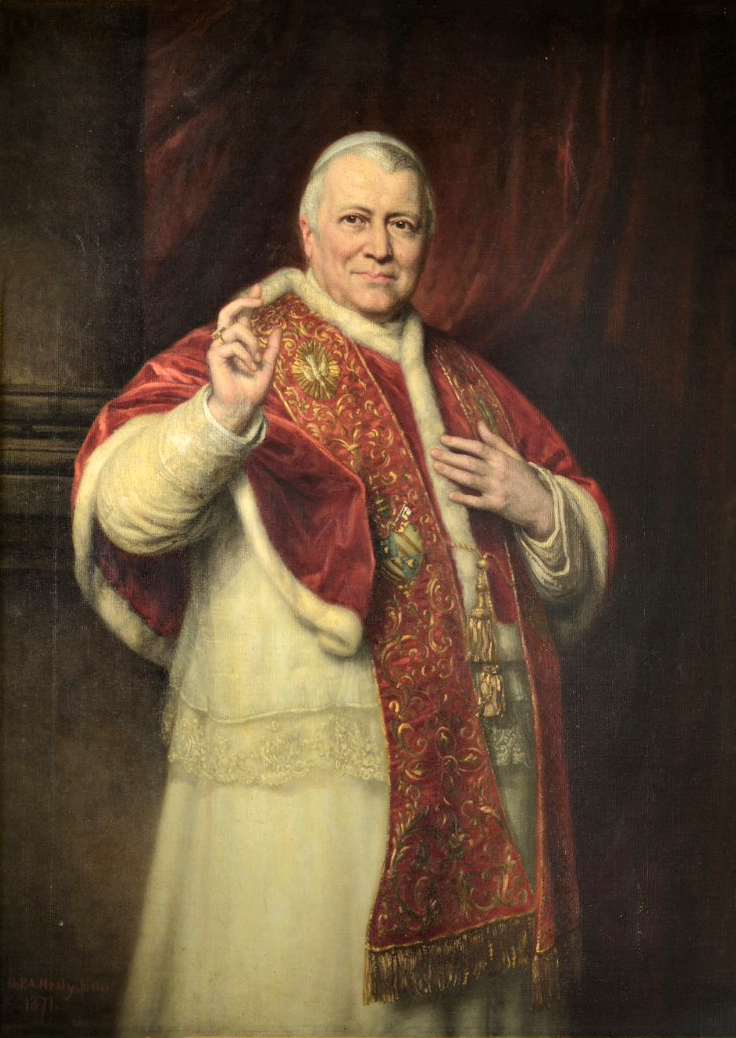
Pope Pius IX, 1871

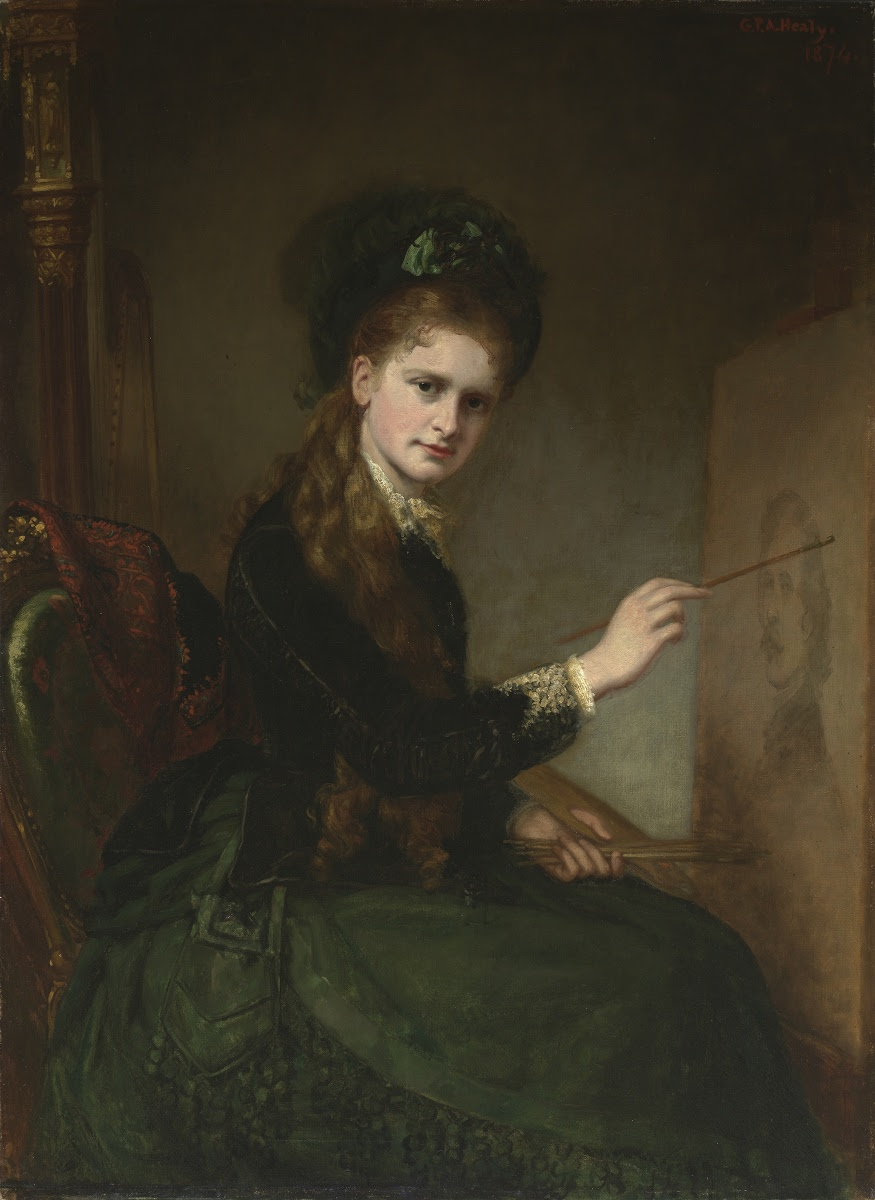
Jennie Byrd Bryan Payne, 1874

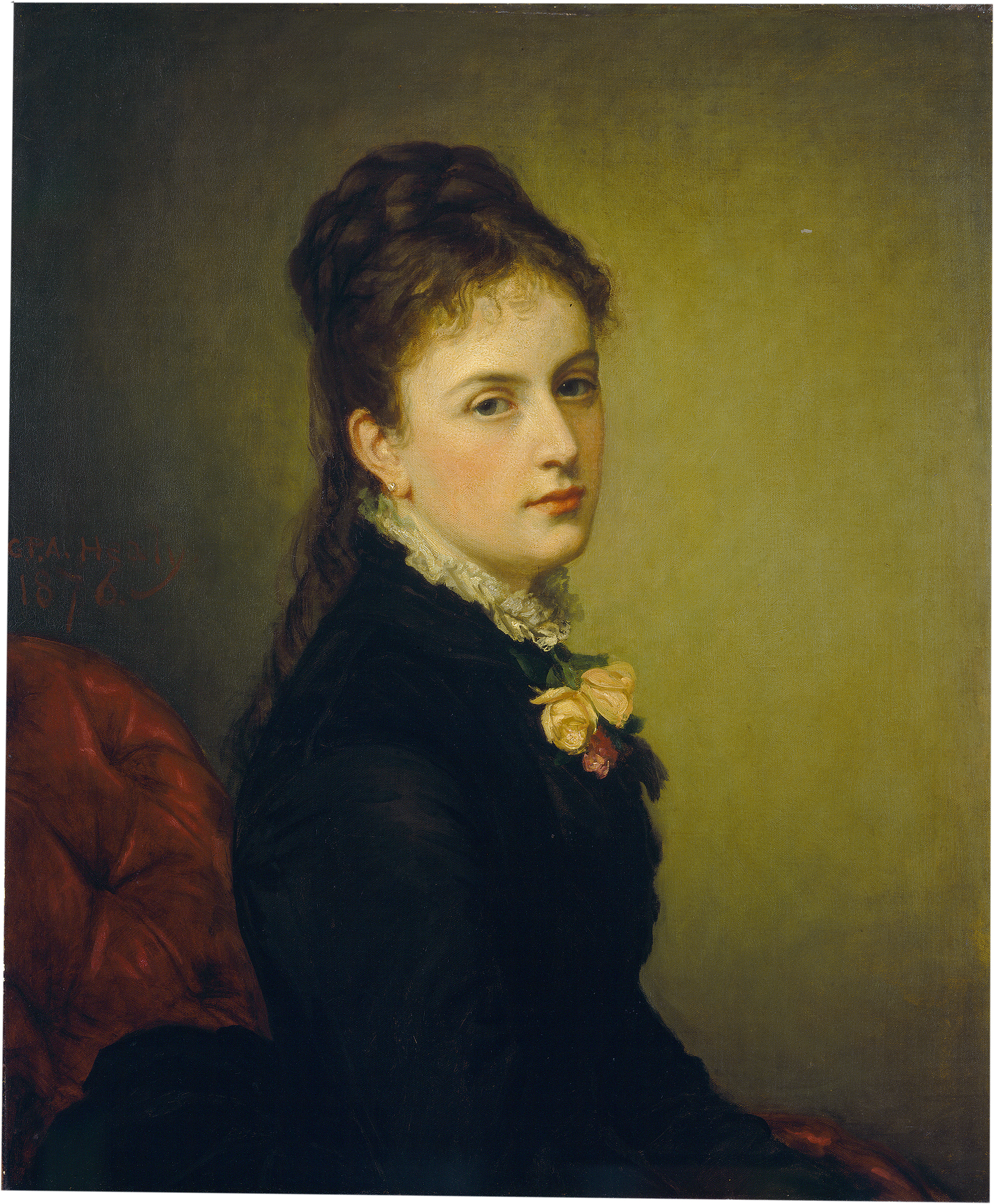
Roxana Atwater Wentworth, 1876, National Gallery of Art

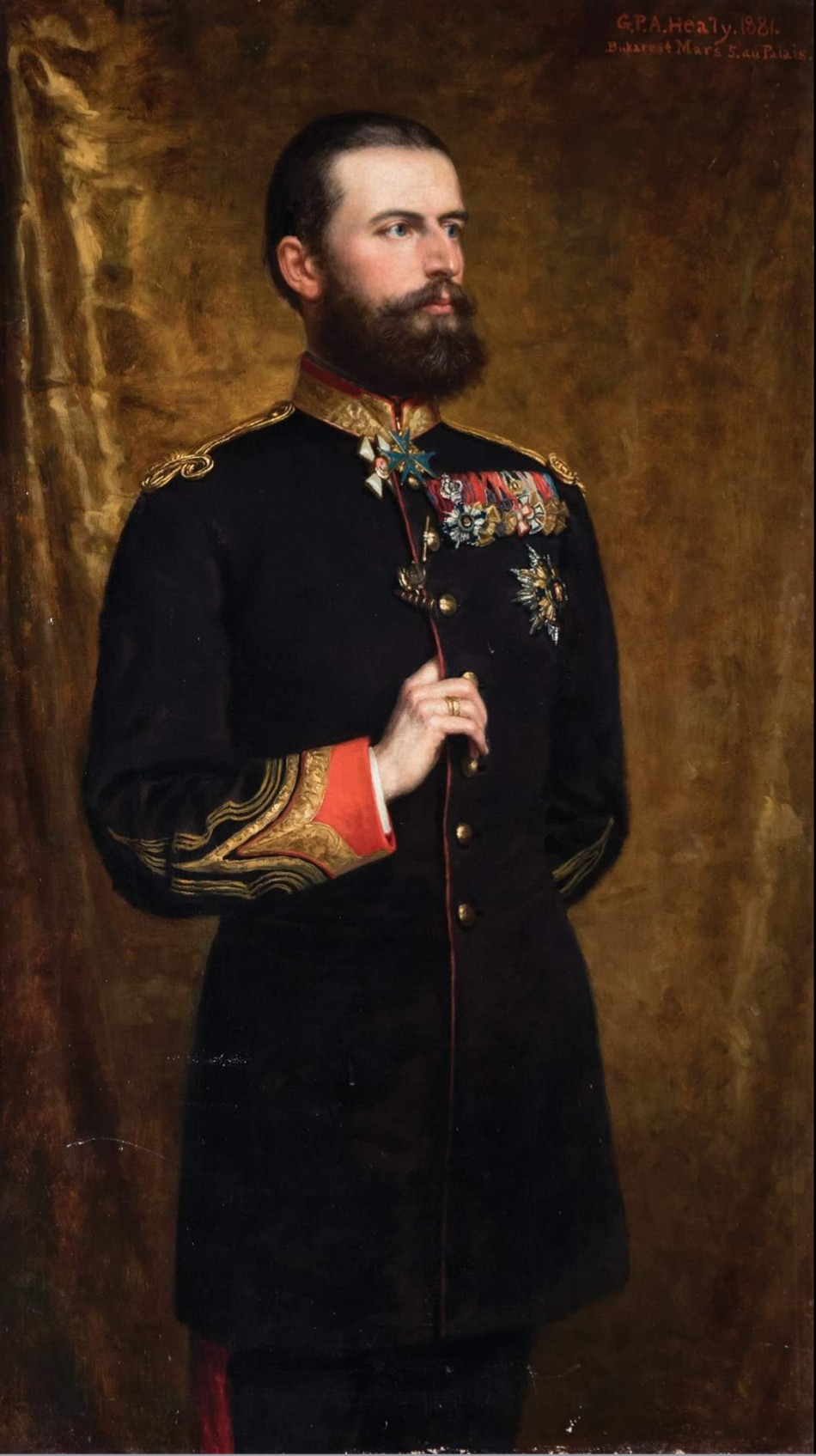
Carol I of Romania, 1881

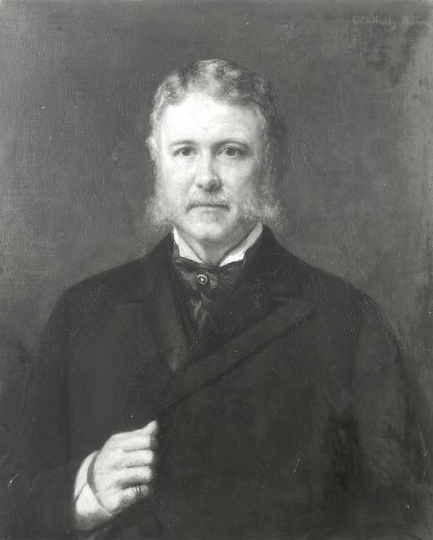
Chester Alan Arthur, 1884

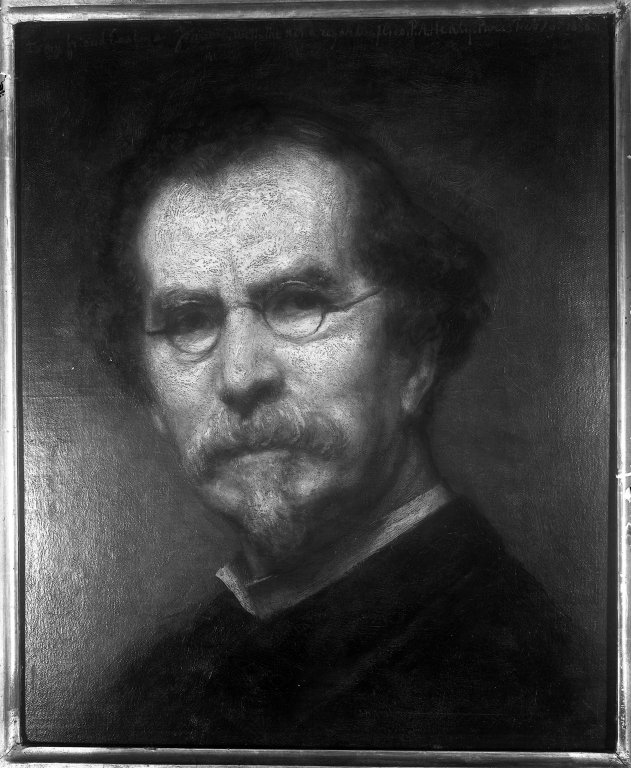
Self-Portrait, 1886

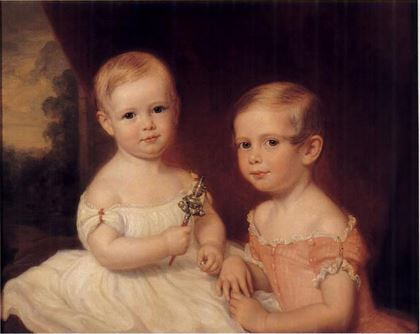
The Wetmore Boys

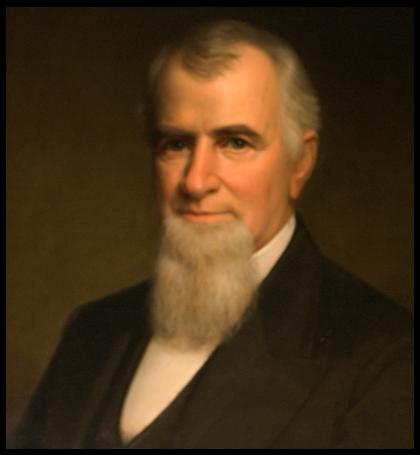
Benjamin S. Edwards

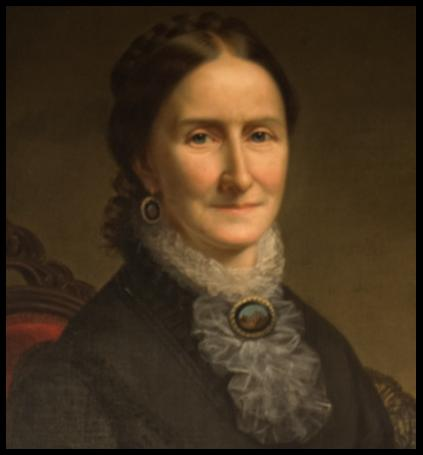
Helen Edwards

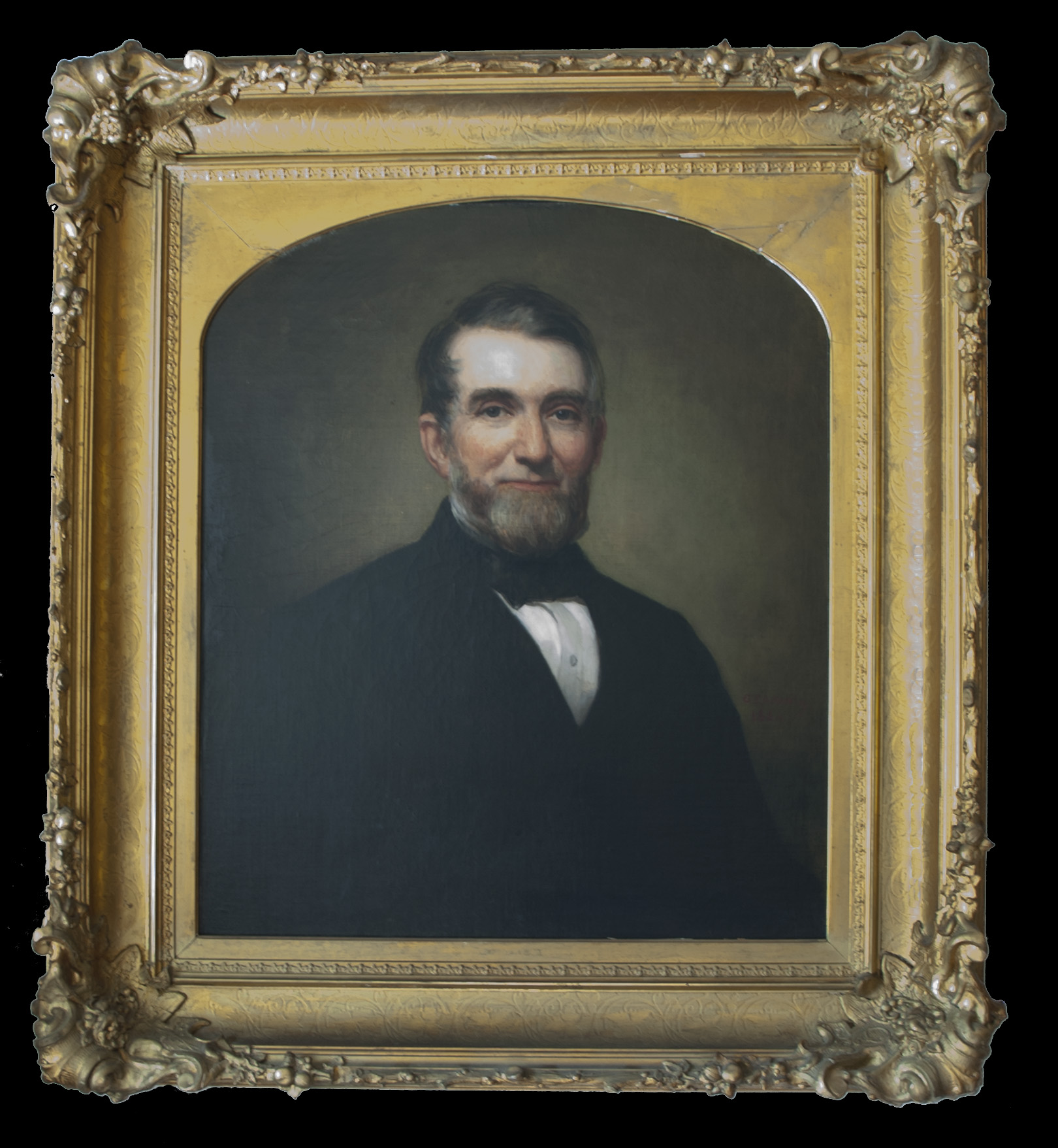
Ninian Wirt Edwards

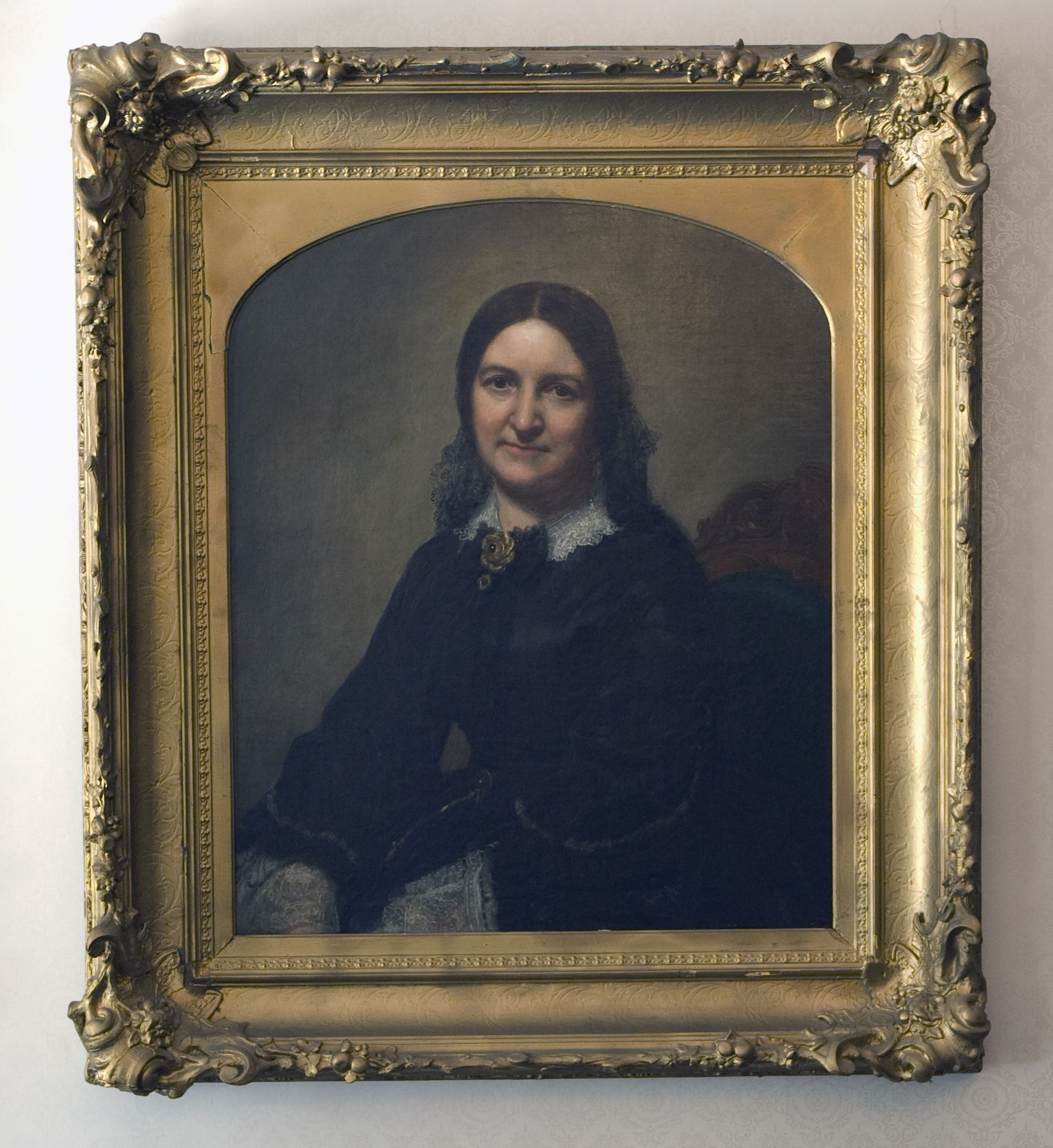
Elizabeth Todd Edwards

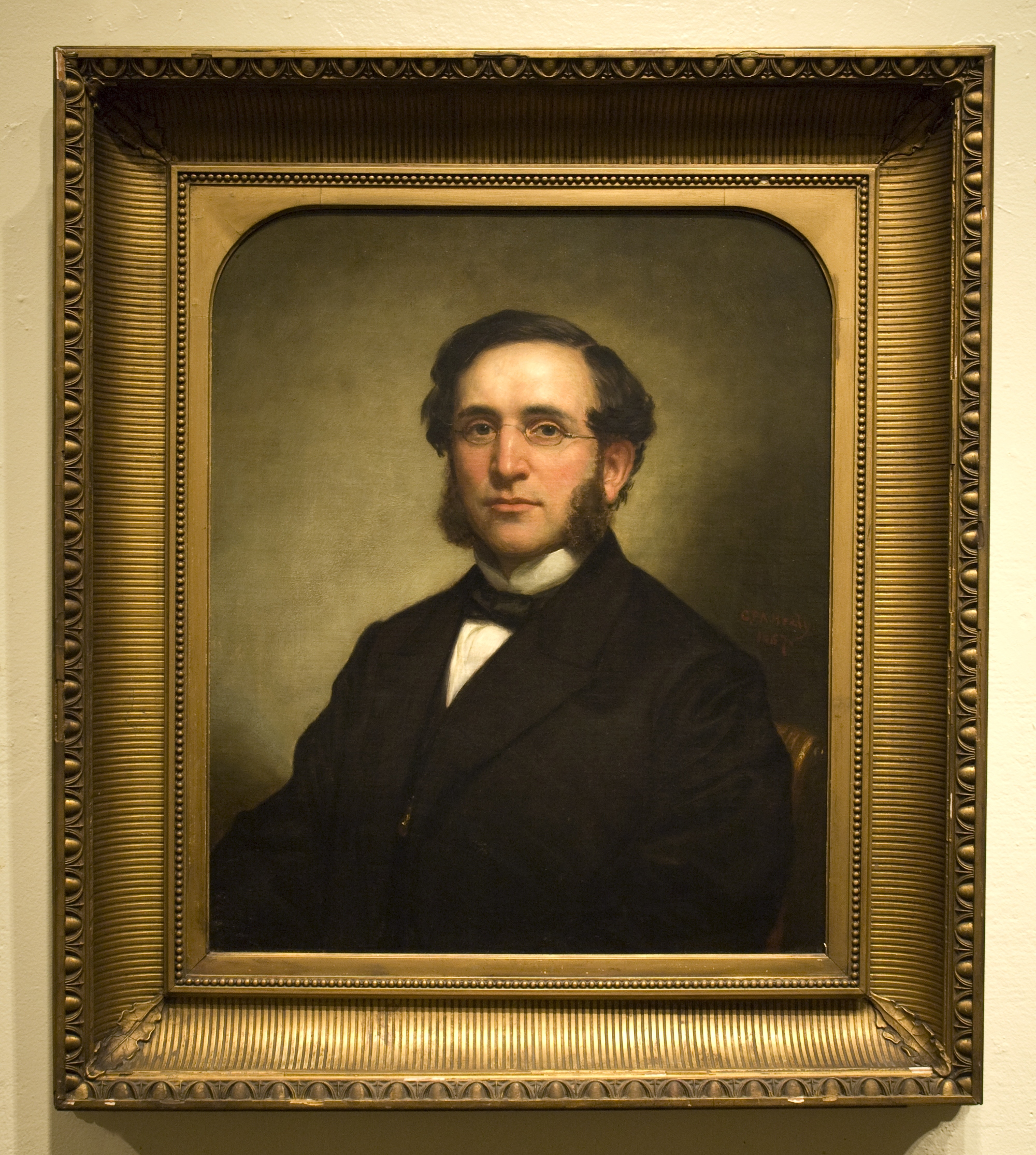
Judge George Judd

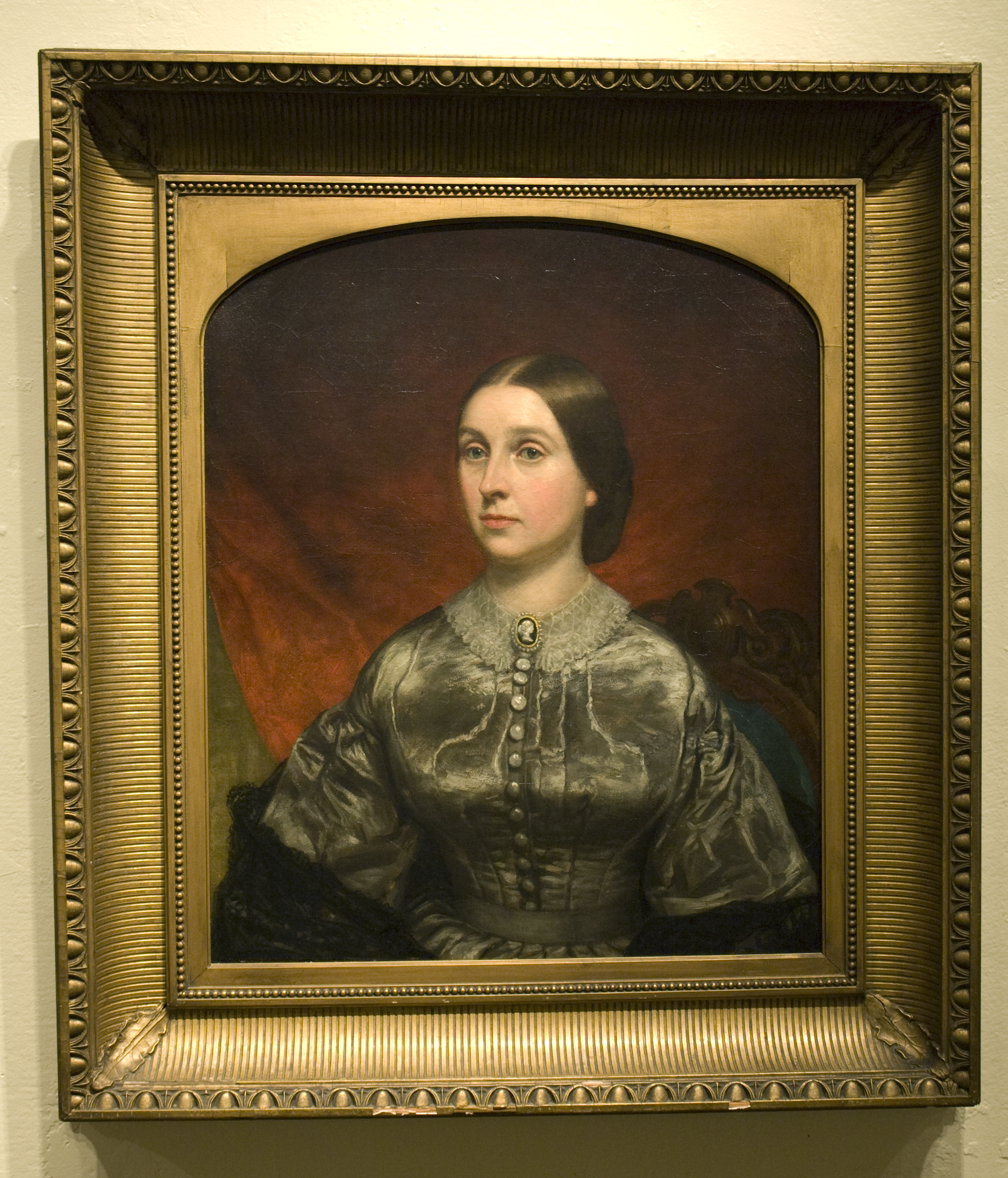
Lucy Judd

== See also ==
- Arch of Titus, 1871 painting by Healy and two others
